= Siege of Viborg (1599) =

Part of the War Against Sigismund

- Part of the War against Sigismund
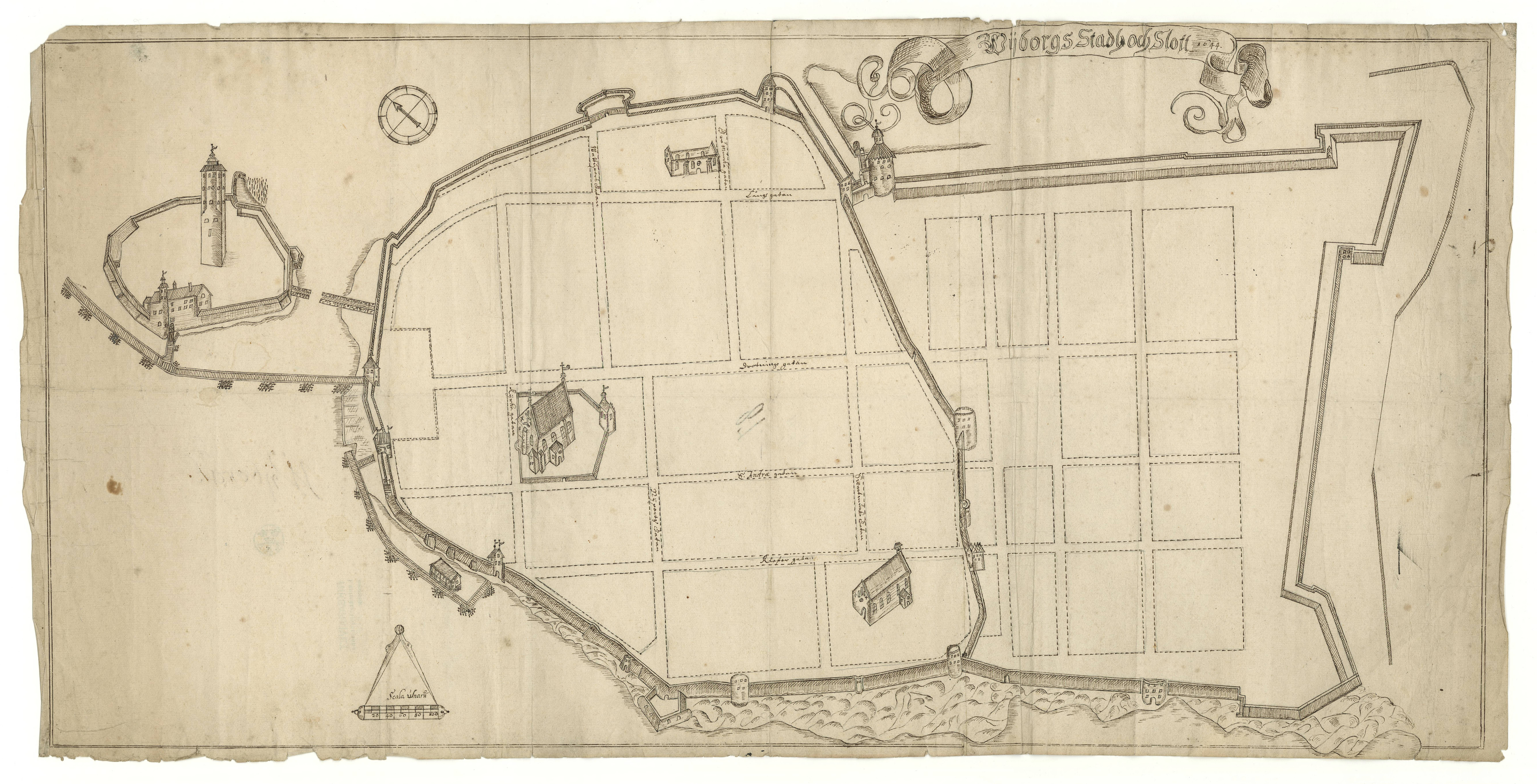
- Overview of Viborg from 1644
Date	21–23 September 1599
Location	Viborg, Sweden (present-day Russia) 60°43′N 28°46′E
Result	Swedish victory
Territorial changes	Viborg is conquered by Duke Charles' forces

Belligerents
Sweden	Polish–Swedish union; Polish–Lithuanian Commonwealth

Commanders and leaders
Duke Charles; Axel Ryning; Peder Stolpe	Arvid Henriksson Tavast (surrendered); Ivar Tavast (surrendered); Lorentz Mårtensson (surrendered); Axel Kurck (POW); Kasper Tiesenhausen; Willam Farensbach

Units involved
Several landsknecht companies	Viborg garrison Three cavalry companies

Strength
Unknown	1,200–3,000 men in the garrison c. 300–400 men in the relief force

Casualties and losses
Minor	Several killed and captured

The siege of Viborg (Swedish: belägringen av Viborg) occurred from 21 to 23 September 1599 during the War against Sigismund. A force led by Duke Charles (later Charles IX) besieged the town and castle of Viborg, capturing the town shortly after landing and forcing the castle garrison to capitulate two days later.

In August 1599, Charles launched an expedition to Finland, defeating forces led by Axel Kurck at the battle of S:t Mårtens before advancing on Helsinki, where he seized several ships. He departed the city on 17 September and reached Viborg on 21 September. After the town refused his demand to surrender, Charles landed his troops and captured the suburb of Siikaniemi.

The burghers of Viborg largely sympathized with Charles, refusing to assist in the town's defense and raising food prices for the garrison. On the day of Charles' arrival, a group of burghers offered to open the Håkans/Vattu Gate for the Swedish forces if their lives and property were protected. Peder Stolpe subsequently assaulted and captured the gate with several companies at 3 p.m., allowing Charles' troops to enter the town.

As the situation for the defenders worsened, negotiations began on 23 September, and the castle capitulated later that day.

== Background ==
In August 1599, Duke Charles, having consolidated his power in Sweden after a victory at Stångebro, went on an expedition to Finland. His troops landed in Finland on 18 August, and after giving pursuit to a force of 1,100 men under the command of Axel Kurck, they engaged in a battle at S:t Mårtens, ending in a defeat for Kurck. After his defeat, Kurck initially fled to Tavastehus, while Charles continued towards Helsinki where he hoped to seize a fleet stationed there.

=== Situation in Viborg ===
Though he required 6,000–7,000 men to adequately defend Viborg, Arvid Henriksson Tavast, the commander of the fortress, reported to Nyslott on 9 September that the garrison numbered only about 3,000 men. However, historians disagree on the exact size. Johan Wilhelm Ruuth estimates that the garrison only numbered 1,200 to 1,400 men, while Anders Fryxell estimates it had 1,300 men. Tavast hoped that Bengt Hansson, the bailiff of Little Savolax, would bring a few thousand peasants as reinforcements. Ambrosius Hindersson had also been ordered to proceed to Viborg with his entire force and supplies enough to last two to three months. However, Ambrosius replied that he would be unable to bring any of the men who had survived the battle at S:t Mårtens and that the peasants in Savolax were even less willing to march to war.

The exact amount of supplies in Viborg is unknown. They were probably limited, however, and Gödik Fincke claimed that no more than 100 barrels of barley and 15 barrels of rye remained after Ambrosius Hindersson declined to come to Viborg's aid. Although Viborg likely possessed more supplies, they were insufficient if it were to be reinforced.

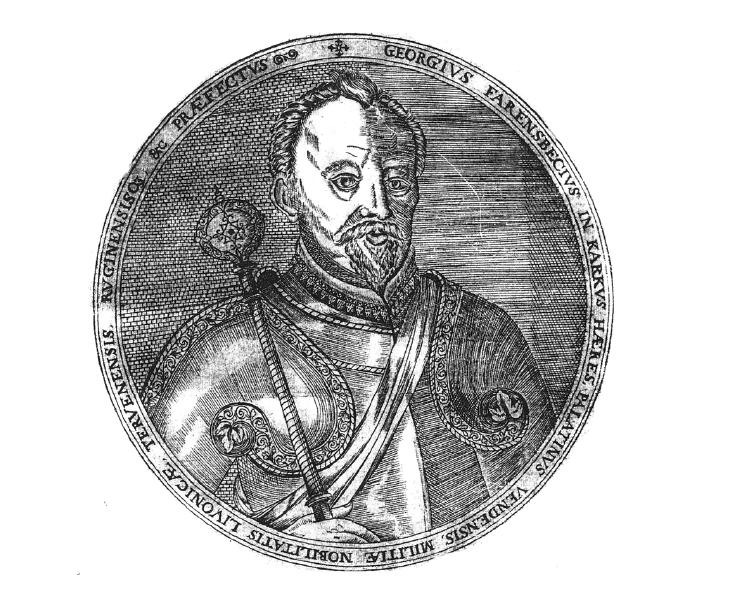
16th century depiction of Jürgen von Fahrensbach by an unknown author

On 27 August, a relief force of German cavalry under the command of Jürgen von Farensbach arrived in Reval. As he lacked the means to transport his troops to Viborg, he requested assistance from the townspeople of Reval, but they refused and closed the city gates against him. As a result, Farensbach was only able to send part of his force to Viborg. According to Sigismund III's commission he was supposed to have 1,700 men, but in reality he reportedly had fewer than 1,000. From this force he dispatched three companies. Estimates of the size of these companies vary. Some sources estimate it at 300 men, while others estimate it at 400 men in total. These reinforcements arrived in Viborg on 10 September under the command of Kasper Tiesenhausen and Willam Farensbach.

The relief force had initially been sent westward in hopes of relieving Åbo, which was under siege at the time. It split into two groups, one commanded by Tiesenhausen and Farensbach and the other one by of Ivar Tavast and Klein Jochum. A force under Nils Olofsson of Meldola was also ordered to proceed seawards in the same direction. However, they were forced to withdraw after marching an unknown distance due to Charles' superior strength. In a final letter sent to Sigismund on 17 September, Arvid Henriksson Tawast wrote that he had written previous letters, but received no reply. He added:

since the prince with his people presses us closely, I humbly beg that Your Royal Majesty himself, in person, would proceed to Reval, and if possible that it might occur yet this autumn, so that the common people might perceive that Your Royal Majesty bears concern and care for their welfare; for the longer Your Royal Majesty delays in this, the more fall into the hands of Duke Charles. Your Royal Majesty can well consider how possible it is that the Finnish soldiery can stand against the whole power of Sweden. Therefore we await Your Royal Majesty’s fortunate arrival and assistance with the greatest longing.

However, Sigismund believed that he had shown enough concern for the events in Finland, and thus remained in Warsaw.

== Prelude ==
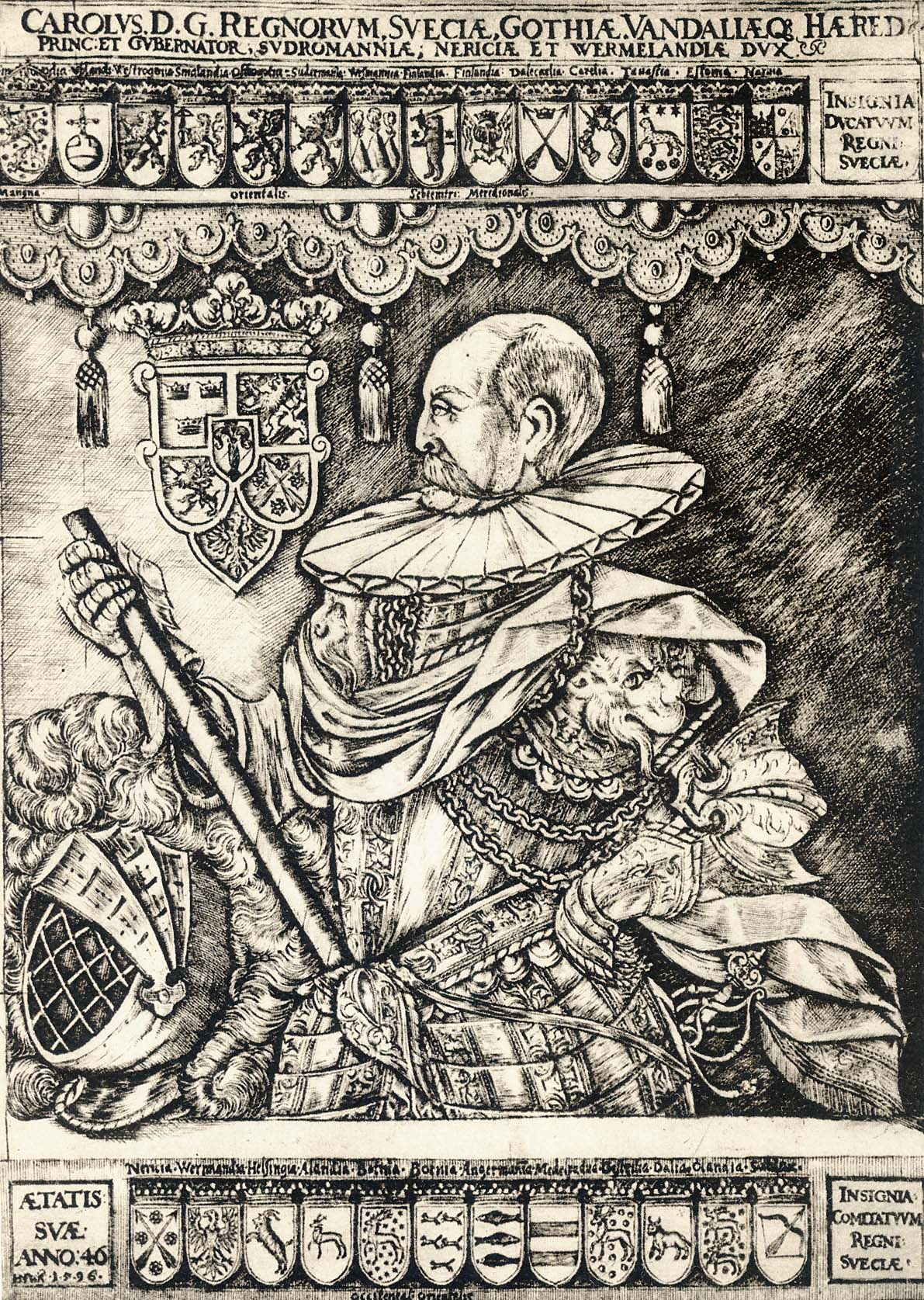
Engraving of Duke Charles from 1596 by Hieronymus Nützel

On 3 September, Charles' forces arrived in Helsinki. Despite Admiral Arvid Tönnesson having fled to Reval with two ships three days earlier, he had left several ships, ammunition, and cannons behind, which Charles seized. While initially planning on continuing towards Viborg, Charles remained in Helsinki for two weeks, awaiting information about the whereabouts of Tönnesson and Kurck. He also planned on sailing to Viborg by sea, and thus had to wait for the arrival of transport ships from Åbo. Peasants around Finland were ordered to attack Kurck's troops if spotted and not to pay taxes to the nobility nor show any allegiance to them.

On 17 September, Charles set out from Helsinki. He had also found out where Kurck and Tönnesson had gone, with Kurck having fled to Viborg with his remaining forces. He also sent some ships and several warning letters to Reval. He dispatched Axel Ryning to go with his cavalry towards Viborg on land while he went by sea, arriving in Viborg on 21 September. The Swedish fleet was commanded by Peder Stolpe.

== Siege ==
Charles arrived with ships and troops at the roadstead of Viborg and on 21 September landed west of the castle. Before landing, he sent a letter to the mayor and council of Viborg urging them to open the city gates and submit to the Swedish Crown, but this had no effect. After landing, he seized the suburb of Siikaniemi, which the retreating garrison unsuccessfully attempted to burn; only the castle’s outerworks and a few mills were destroyed by fire. The following day, Peder Stolpe was sent with several companies of landsknechts toward the Pantsarlaks side, while another force encamped outside the Karelian Gate. In this way the town and castle were surrounded on all sides. Axel Kurck had been assigned to defend the town along with the relief force, but they attempted to compel the burghers to assist in the defense after realized they had too few men to adequately defend the town.

However, the burghers sympathized with Charles and used the extensive fortifications as an excuse to not help in defending Viborg. They also raised the prices on all foodstuffs that they sold to the soldiers. About this, a German commander wrote, "God knows that here so many old goats are being slaughtered as I have never seen in all the days of my life, and one must pay 6 ducats for a stinking goat, and everything one wants must be paid for at the dearest price".

On the same day that Peder Stolpe reached the Pantsarlaks side, some burghers announced that the Håkans/Vattu gate would be opened for Stolpe in the name of Mayor Herman Bröijer if he swore to protect the townspeople, their wives, children, and property. Stolpe reported this to Charles, and accordingly assaulted the gate at 3 p.m. with seven companies, capturing it without the garrison noticing. Charles also sent troops towards the town from the Siikaniemi side, forcing the defenders there to retreat. Crossing the strait was difficult due to Charles' fleet, and several men were killed and captured. Among the captured were Axel Kurck. However, 60 to 70 cavalry under the command of Klein Jochum and a certain Dombuski managed to escape. They broke through the Karelian gate, through Charles' infantry lines, and fled to Estonia. During the fighting, Charles' forces suffered minor losses, except for a boatload of soldiers sinking after coming under fire from the castle's cannons.

=== Negotiations and capitulation ===
Thus, on 22 September, the town fell into Charles' hands and the commanders of the castle garrison, Arvid Hendriksson Tawast, his son Ivar Arvidsson Tavast, and the bailiff Lorentz Mårtensson, had little hope left. On 23 September, an enormous cannon was brought towards the castle and began bombarding the walls, compelling the commanders to negotiate. Under the terms of the surrender, all foreign soldiers would be allowed to depart, while those who were subjects of Sweden were to be dealt with according to Swedish law. Soon after, the castle and its garrison capitulated.

== Aftermath ==
Following either a field court or an order issued solely on Charles' accusations, both Arvid and Ivar Tavast were executed on 26 September. Nils Olsson of Meldola, Jakob Olsson of Bolstad, and Lars Mattson Creutz were also executed, and they had their heads impaled on iron spikes on the city gates. Several non-nobles suffered the same fate, including Henricus Plåck and Henrik Jespersson. After being executed, their bodies were dissected and displayed on wheels. Others, such as Axel Kurck, were spared. The events were described in a contemporary poem:

The good lord Duke Charles
leapt upon his good horse,
mounted the saddle boards,
let the horse with the flowing tail run,
rode along the saddle’s back
down to green Viborg.
Soon you wept in Viborg
that the sons were taken away;
wives in Narva lamented
that their husbands were beheaded

Around the time of Viborg's capitulation, several other fortifications around Finland fell without any fighting.

== See also ==
- Battle of S:t Mårtens – Part of the War Against Sigismund
- Siege of Turku Castle – Part of the War Against Sigismund
