= Battle of S:t Mårtens =

Part of the War Against Sigismund

- Part of the War against Sigismund
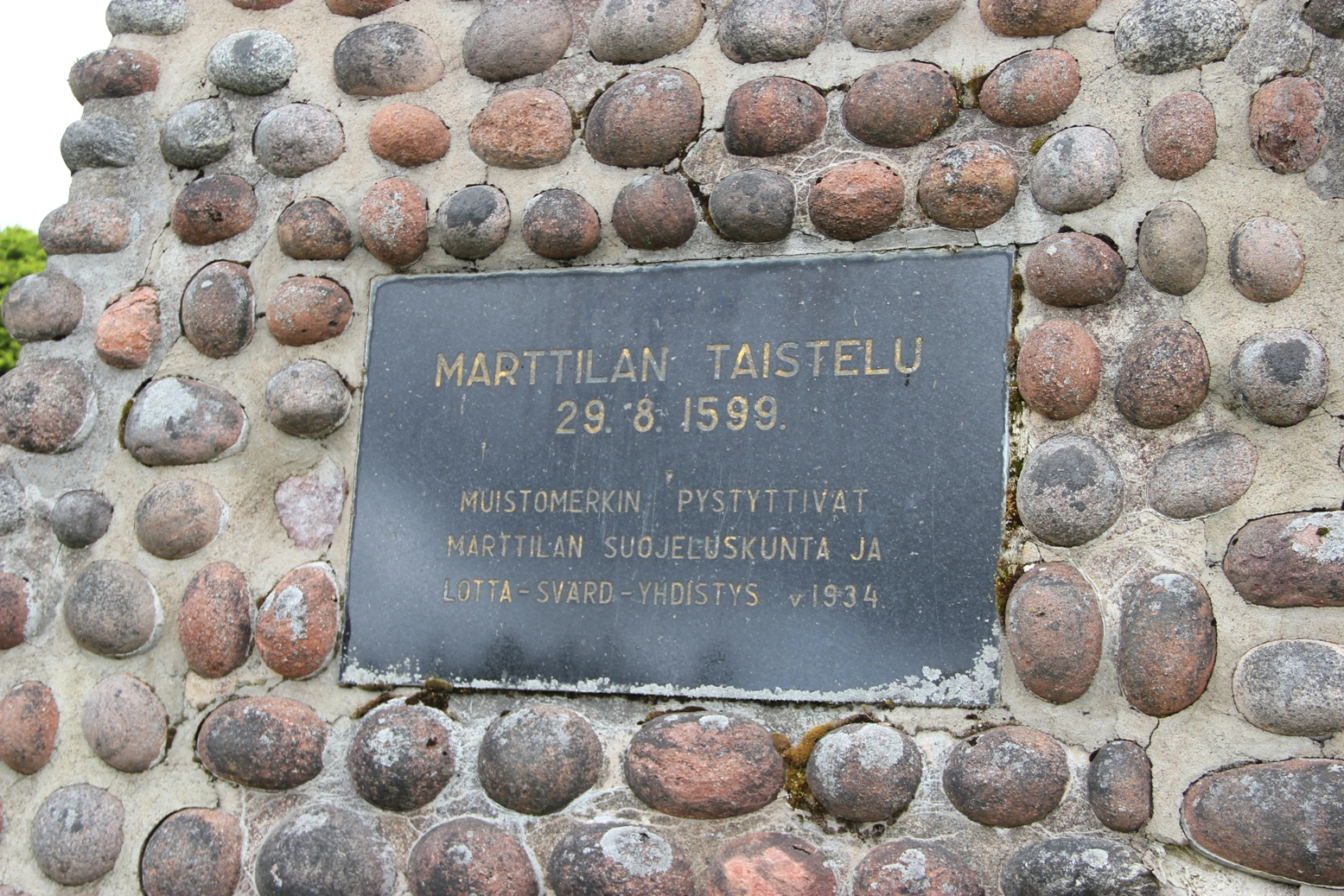
- Memorial plaque of the battle
Date	29 August 1599
Location	S:t Mårtens (modern-day Marttila), Finland 60°35′N 022°54′E
Result	Swedish victory

Belligerents
Sweden	Polish–Swedish union

Commanders and leaders
Duke Charles; Kasten Schade (WIA); Hans Buck †	Axel Kurck

Strength
2,000–3,000 men	1,100 men 10 guns

The battle of S:t Mårtens (Swedish: slaget i S:t Mårtens; Finnish: Marttilan taistelu) occurred on 29 August 1599 during the war against Sigismund between a force of 2,000–3,000 men under the command of Duke Charles (later Charles IX) and a force of 1,100 men under the command of Axel Kurck.

After consolidating his power in Sweden following his victory at Stångebro in 1598, Duke Charles embarked on a second expedition to Finland in August 1599, following an earlier expedition in 1597. After Charles landed at Ruskiakallio, Kurck withdrew his force, fearing encirclement.

Charles pursued Kurck, and the two forces met near S:t Mårtens. The Finns initially held back the Swedish vanguard, wounding its commander, Kasten Schade, and killing several of his men, but were forced to retreat once the main Swedish force arrived. Upon reaching an open field, they attacked troops under Hans Buck, who was killed in combat along with his lieutenant, Lukas Reuter. Although the Finns inflicted heavy losses and pursued the Swedes for 1–2 leagues, they fell into disarray after becoming exposed at the rear, and the battle ended in a victory for Charles.

== Background ==
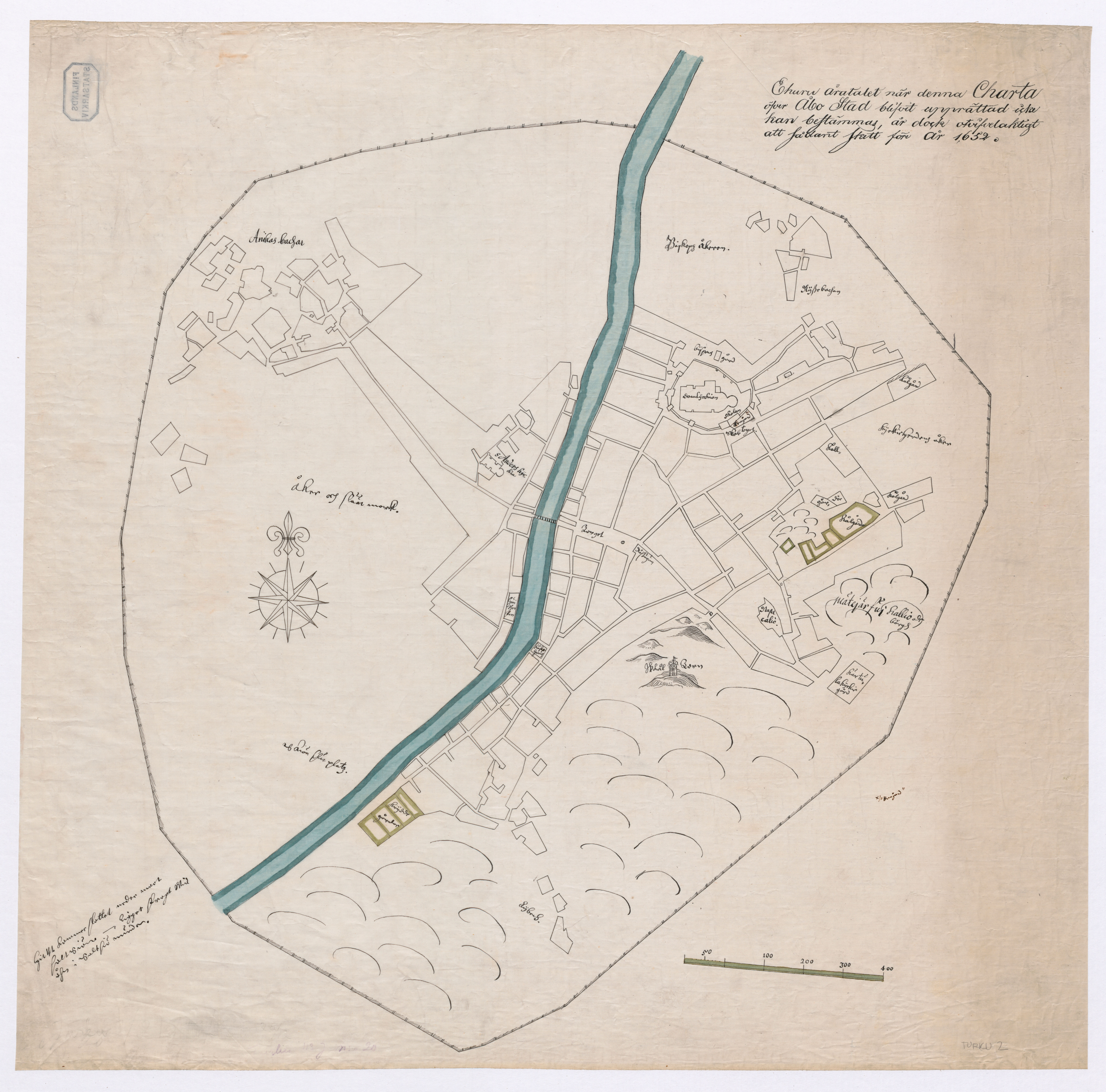
Map of Åbo from 1634 by Olof Gangius

In August 1597, at the start of the war against Sigismund, Duke Charles went on an expedition to Finland. The expedition was successful, with his forces managing to besiege and capture Åbo Castle from its defenders, who were loyal to Sigismund III. Before his departure, Charles promised to come back and finish the campaign. However, Åbo fell to Arvid Stålarm on Christmas of the same year, after Charles had returned to Sweden.

In 1598, Kalmar capitulated to Sigismund III, and Stockholm fell to a small squadron under the command of Samuel Laski. This made Charles' defeat seem inevitable. However, on 25 September, he won a decisive victory at Stångebro, and he signed a truce with Sigismund three days later. Charles' victory at Stångebro led to Sigismund losing control of Sweden.

After his victory, Charles began consolidating his power during the winter of 1598–1599. By summer 1599, he embarked on a second expedition to Finland to fulfill the promise he had made in autumn 1597. His troops first recaptured Åland, where Kastelholm had fallen earlier in July.

=== Prelude ===
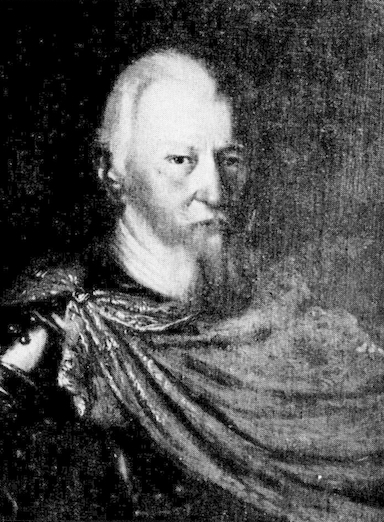
Anonymous depiction of Axel Kurck

On 18 August, Charles and his men landed south of Åbo, dispersing a group of Finnish cavalry at Halikko. His initial strategy was to prevent Finnish troops in Åbo from reaching inland fortifications, but this changed, and he re-embarked and landed at Ruskiakallio, as he had two years earlier. Axel Kurck replaced Arvid Stålarm as the commander of the Finnish troops. Fearing encirclement, Kurck razed his camp in Åbo and withdrew to S:t Mårten, leaving Stålarm in Åbo with 400–500 men. Other sources claim 720 men were left in Åbo. This left Kurck with around 700 cavalry, 200 infantry, and 200 artillerymen, compared to Charles' force of 8,800 men, consisting of 7,000 infantry and 1,800 cavalry. However, only 2,000–3,000 men accompanied Charles.

== Battle ==
As Kurck withdrew, Charles pursued the Finnish forces. The Finnish troops camped near the church in S:t Mårtens, awaiting reinforcements from Estonia, commanded by Jürgen von Farensbach. Charles' forces arrived at Eura on 28 August, and fighting began on 29 August. Initially, the Finns sent men to Charles' camp, pretending to desert. However, they returned to the Finnish camp with intelligence about Charles' plans. The intelligence claimed that Charles planned to send a reconnaissance force, and the Finns decided to inflict as much damage on it as possible.

The Finns managed to hold off Charles' vanguard, which was led by 100 men under the command of Kasten Schade, followed by Ryttmästare Hans Buck's cavalry. During the initial action, they wounded Schade and killed several of his men, but were forced back once Charles' main force arrived. Kurck's forces initially retreated in good form to a forest path, and the Swedes had difficulty exploiting their numerical superiority due to limited mobility. When the Finns reached an open field, they attacked troops commanded by Buck. As Charles' other troops could not reinforce them in time, Buck and his lieutenant Lukas Reuter were killed. Four Finnish companies also arrived and inflicted heavy losses on Charles' troops, who they pursued for 1–2 leagues. However, the Finns were constantly forced to retreat, and the Swedes were able to attack across a broad front once the forest had given way. The battle ended soon after, as the Finnish troops were now exposed from the rear.

== Aftermath ==
The Finns were forced to retreat, during which the Swedes killed several of them. As a result of their retreat, the Finns left their artillery (10 guns in total) and baggage train behind. According to Yrjö Koskinen, Charles' forces suffered 160 killed, while Kurck's forces suffered 100–200 killed. Without specifying exact numbers, Finnish historian Heikki Ylikangas notes that Kurck's forces suffered higher casualties. However, other sources claim both sides suffered equal casualties, while others specify 100 killed on each side. The captured artillery and Hans Buck's corpse were brought to Åbo after the battle.

Despite Kurck's attempts to keep his retreating troops in good order, cavalrymen from Nyslott shouted:

What is now this great relief, which we are trusted with? What is it now, which so often with their letters have given us such certain confidence of help and assistance from foreign people? Our king knows nothing of this confidence, unless you of the nobility and the officers have caused that rumor to come about for the sake of your estates and fiefs, in order to bring it upon our necks.

A contemporary poem also described Charles' victory and the Finnish retreat:

The great lords ran into the swamps,
The mighty masters into the marsh,
Kurki fled into the spruce forest,
Arvi escaped into the lowland,
Harteviikki into the brush,
Antti Boije down a side path,
Sten Fincke off the road entirely.
Hard the hooked cloak flew,
Dust rose, ashes stung the air.
A grim rider toward Häme,
A strong one into the rapids,
Into that treacherous river
There the pike fish snapped at them,
The perch took their portion.

Following the battle, local peasants guided Charles' troops to the farms owned by people who they had suffered the most under in earlier years. Exaggerated accounts of violence committed by Sigismund's troops had spread, and Charles' troops sought retaliation for these. They seized property, tortured and beat people in order to extract goods, and women were raped.

== See also ==
- Cudgel War – 1596–1597 peasant uprising in Finland
- Siege of Turku Castle (1597) – Part of the War Against Sigismund
- Battle of Stångebro – 1598 battle in Sweden
