= Ebba Stenbock =

Swedish noble (c. 1550 – 1614)

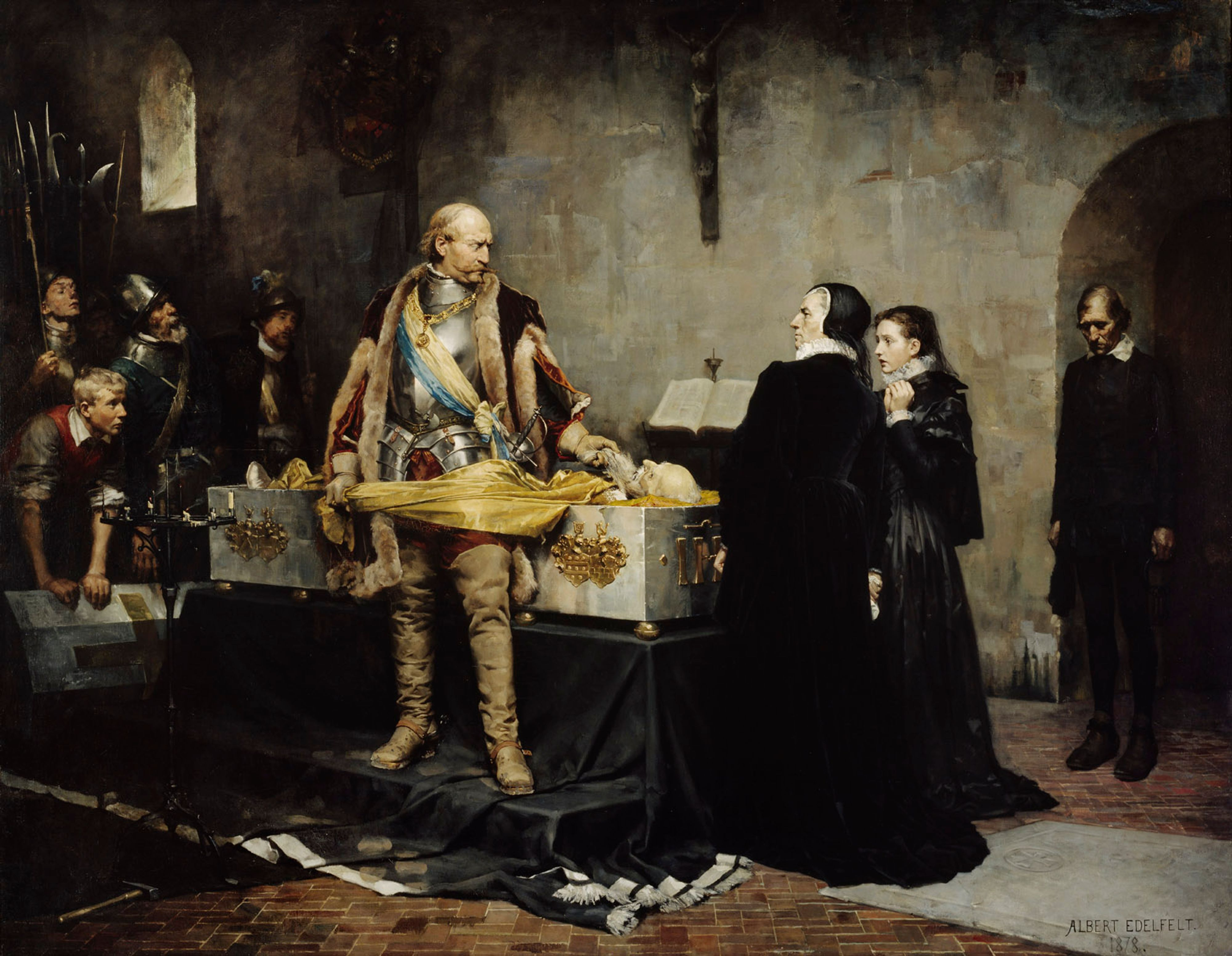
The regent Duke Charles (later King Charles IX) insulting the corpse of Klaus Fleming in the presence of Ebba Stenbock. Albert Edelfelt's painting, 1878.

Ebba Gustavsdotter Stenbock (c. 1550 – 8 March 1614, in Sweden) was a Swedish noble. She led the defense of the stronghold Turku Castle for the loyalists of Sigismund III Vasa during the siege by Charles IX of Sweden in succession of her spouse Clas Eriksson Fleming (1530–1597), governor of Finland. The sister of Queen Katarina Stenbock, she married Clas Eriksson Fleming (1530–1597), governor of Finland, in 1573.

== Life ==
Ebba Stenbock was the daughter of riksråd Gustaf Olofsson Stenbock and Brita Eriksdotter Leijonhufvud, and the sister of Queen Catherine Stenbock. She was the niece of Queen Margareta Leijonhufvud, and thereby the cousin of the royal children of that marriage, including the future John III of Sweden and Charles IX of Sweden. In 1573, she married Clas Eriksson Fleming in the house of her sister, the Queen Dowager in Stockholm, and moved with him to Finland. She had three children during her marriage: the daughters Katarina, Hebla and Margareta, and her son Johan Fleming. In 1594, her spouse was appointed Governor-General of Finland.

Ebba Stenbock was noted for her fearless conduct toward Duke Charles. In the civil war the erupted in 1595 when Sigismund III Vasa was challenged by his uncle, the future Charles IX of Sweden, her spouse was one of the strongest supporters of Sigismund III Vasa and opposed to Charles IX of Sweden, and held the Swedish province of Finland against Duke Charles. In parallel, the Cudgel War erupted in Finland in 1596.

=== Cudgel War ===
In April 1597, after having subdued the Cudgel War and preparing to resist the expected invasion of Duke Charles, Fleming died. He was succeeded as governor by Arvid Stålarm the Younger, but Ebba took over the moral leadership and decided to continue the line of her spouse and defend Turku Castle against the army of Duke Charles with the help of two noble officers, who took the military leadership by her side. She prepared the castle for a siege awaiting relief from King Sigismund in Poland. In August 1597, Duke Charles and his army invaded Finland, took Åland, which was the fief of her sister Queen Dowager Catherine, and besieged Turku Castle. He offered the women of the Castle safe passage through the lines, including Ebba, but was given no reply. During the siege, he fired through the windows of the castle to frighten the female entourage of Ebba, but: "They would not allow themselves to be afraid, as Lady Ebba spoke to them both nobility and the rest, who were there with her, that they should keep themselves manly", that is to say, that they should show courage. Ebba was eventually forced to surrender, as no help from Poland arrived.

Fleming was still not buried, and, according to legend, Charles had the coffin opened to reassure himself that Fleming was indeed dead. After having identified the face of Fleming, he was to have pulled Fleming's beard with the words, "If you had been alive, your head would not have been safe", upon which Ebba Stenbock replied, "If my late husband was alive, Your Grace would never have been here."

=== Later life ===
Ebba and her daughters were taken prisoner and brought to Stockholm, where they were separated and placed in house arrest. Ebba was placed in a house belonging to Welam de Wijk, captain of Duke Charles' fleet, and in 1598, de Wijk was arrested for attempt to start a mutiny, encouraged by Ebba, who had promised him marriage to one of her daughters. In 1599, a messenger of Sigismund from Finland was arrested in Stockholm, with Ebba as one of the loyalists he had delivered letters to. Her son was executed in the Åbo Bloodbath the same year. No formal accusation was brought against her, and she and her daughters were released after the Linköping Bloodbath. Like many other wives and daughters of the exiled loyalists to Sigismund, whose estates had been confiscated by Charles, they took refuge with Queen Dowager Catherine Stenbock at Strömsholm.

== See also ==
- Ebba Bielke
