= Siege of Turku Castle =

Part of the War Against Sigismund

- Part of the War against Sigismund
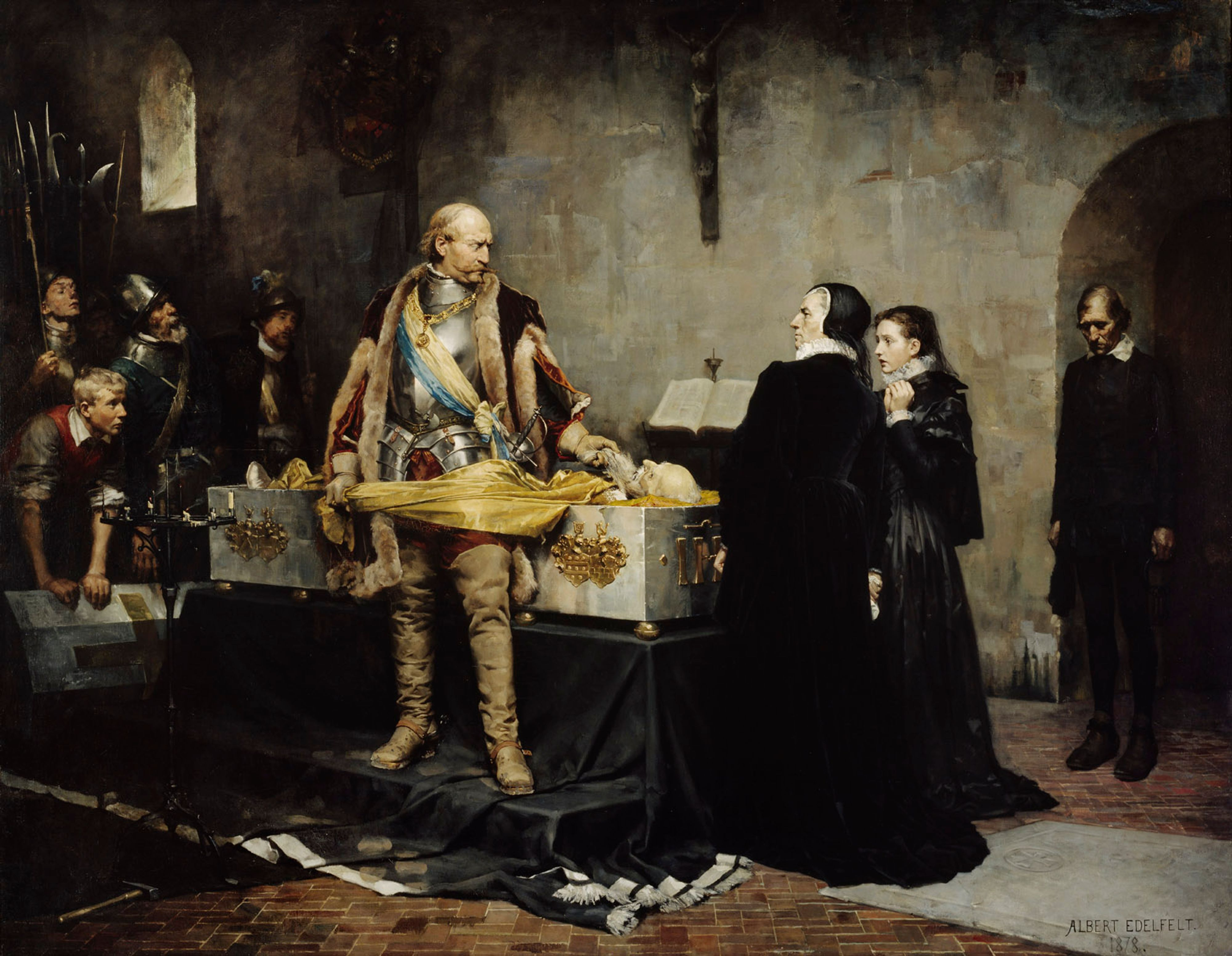
- Duke Karl Insulting the Corpse of Klas Fleming by Albert Edelfelt, 1878
Date	11–30 September 1597
Location	Åbo (present-day Turku), Finland 60°27′6″N 22°16′1″E
Result	Swedish victory
Territorial changes	Turku Castle is conquered by Duke Charles' forces

Belligerents
Sweden	Polish–Swedish union

Commanders and leaders
Duke Charles; Hans Hansson	Ebba Stenbock (surrendered); Bengt Severinsson (surrendered); Hans Eriksson (surrendered); Arvid Stålarm

Strength
12 fähnleins of infantry 500 cavalry Several ships	>1,000 men

Casualties and losses
260 killed Some ships damaged	c. 200 killed (Note: Some 800 men remained at the time of the capitulation) c. 800 captured

The Siege of Turku Castle (Note: Swedish: belägringen av Åbo slott; Finnish: Turun linnan piiritys) occurred from 11 to 30 September 1597 during the early stages of the War against Sigismund.

After gaining full control of the Swedish government along with Kalmar and Älvsborg, Duke Charles went on an expedition to Finland. He arrived at Åbo with a fleet in late August, landing his troops at Ruskiakallio on 7 September where he repelled a force under the command of Arvid Stålarm.

After engaging in failed negotiations and a skirmish at Kuppiskällan on 9 September, Duke Charles formally besieged Åbo on 11 September. As the garrison began to splinter, negotiations began on 29 September, with the garrison capitulating one day later.

According to legend, Duke Charles was led into the castle's church, where he pulled on the beard of the late Klas Fleming, saying that if Fleming was not dead, his head would have been decapitated, with his widow, Ebba Stenbock, replying, "If my blessed lord had lived, His Grace would never have come in here". However, the story was most likely made up.

== Background ==
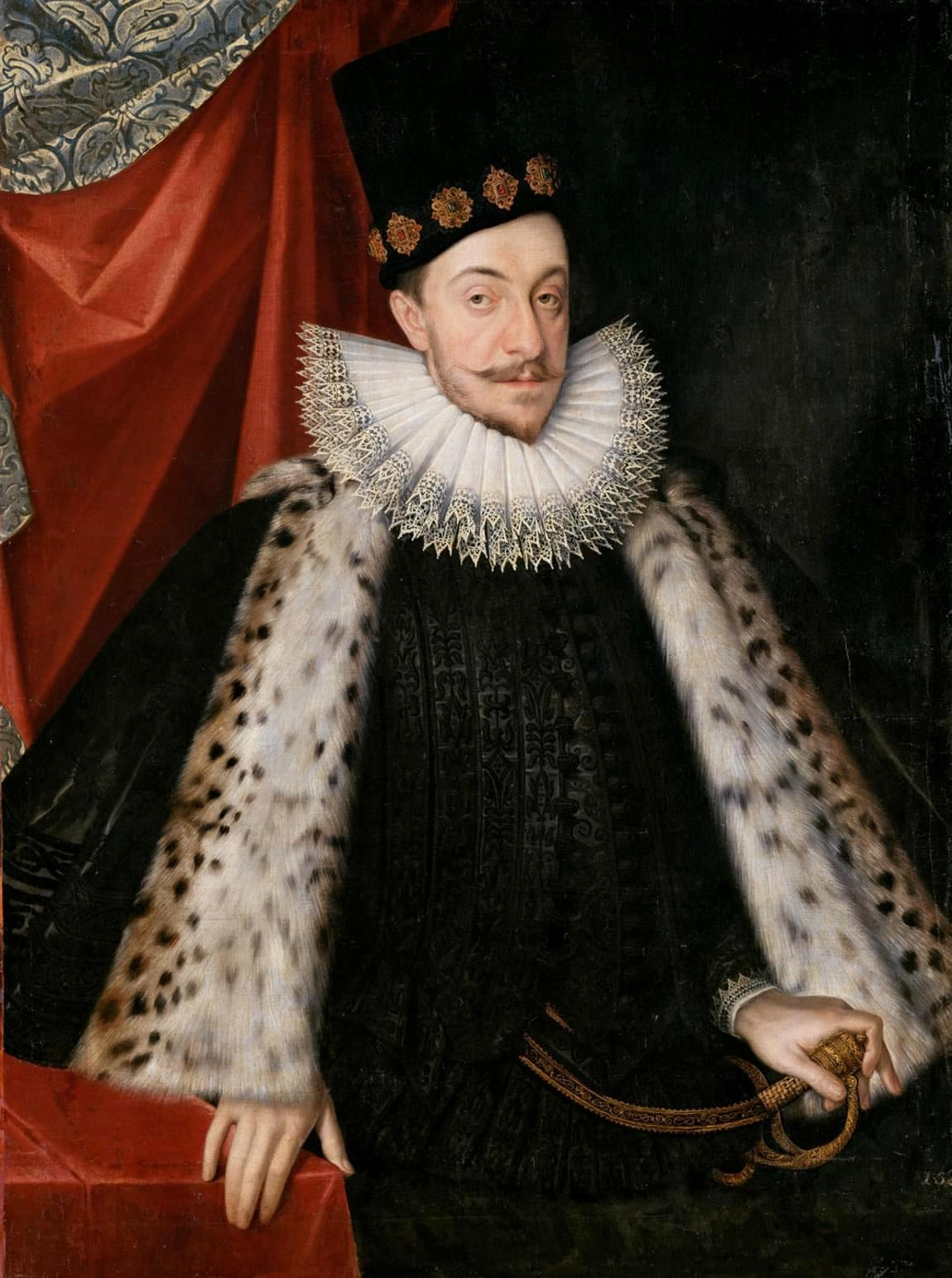
Painting of Sigismund from 1590 by Martin Kober

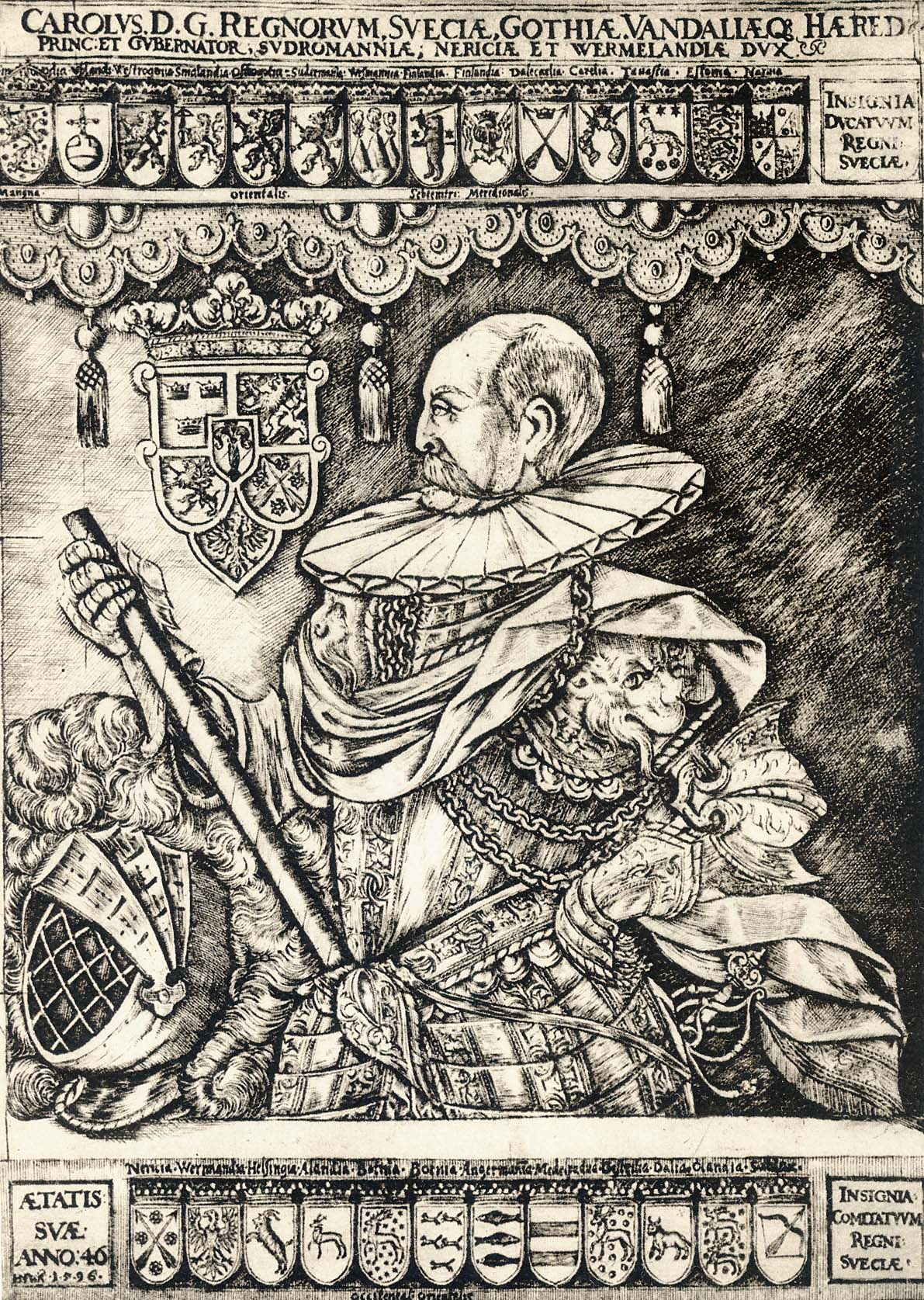
Engraving of Duke Charles from 1596 by Hieronymus Nützel

After Sigismund III's ascension to the Swedish throne following the death of John III in 1592, Sweden and the Polish–Lithuanian Commonwealth entered into a personal union with Sigismund as ruler over both kingdoms. Despite this, Duke Charles remained the regent in Sweden and Sigismund had to uphold Lutheranism as the religion in Sweden. These developments led to crises, such as disagreements over Estonia in the Baltic, which the Poles wanted to be ceded to Poland.

However, Sigismund had support in Finland, where some nobles believed having Sigismund as king would serve well against possible Russian attacks. At the diet of Arboga in 1597, Duke Charles successfully gained full control of the Swedish government after failing to do so two years prior at Söderköping. Soon after gaining power, Duke Charles began capturing several fortresses around Sweden, including Kalmar and Älvsborg before moving towards Finland.

=== Prelude ===
In preparation for his expedition to Finland, propaganda leaflets were sent to Finland, aiming to divide the Finns. He called on nobles and soldiers alike to "answer for their crimes" from the parliamentary assembly in Stockholm in July 1597. He also offered to negotiate, asking for three or four people from each "banner" to come to him. In response, many Finns vowed to defend themselves, though some began having doubts, leading to many soldiers defecting.

On 20 August, Duke Charles' fleet departed from Stockholm, reaching Kastelholm at the end of the month and Åbo a few days later. Despite a powerful fleet assembling at Korpo Strait under the command of Bengt Severinsson, it lacked morale to fight, and the burghers in Åbo increasingly began to side with the duke. In preparation for Charles' attack, mobilization quickly began, with Åbo Castle being upgraded and repaired. Prisoners from the Cudgel War were also employed to dig a new well in the castle. Additionally, cattle, oxen, and rye from the area were brought into the castle.

The garrison's commanders also hoped that Sigismund would come to their aid or at least send reinforcements from Livonia.

== Siege ==
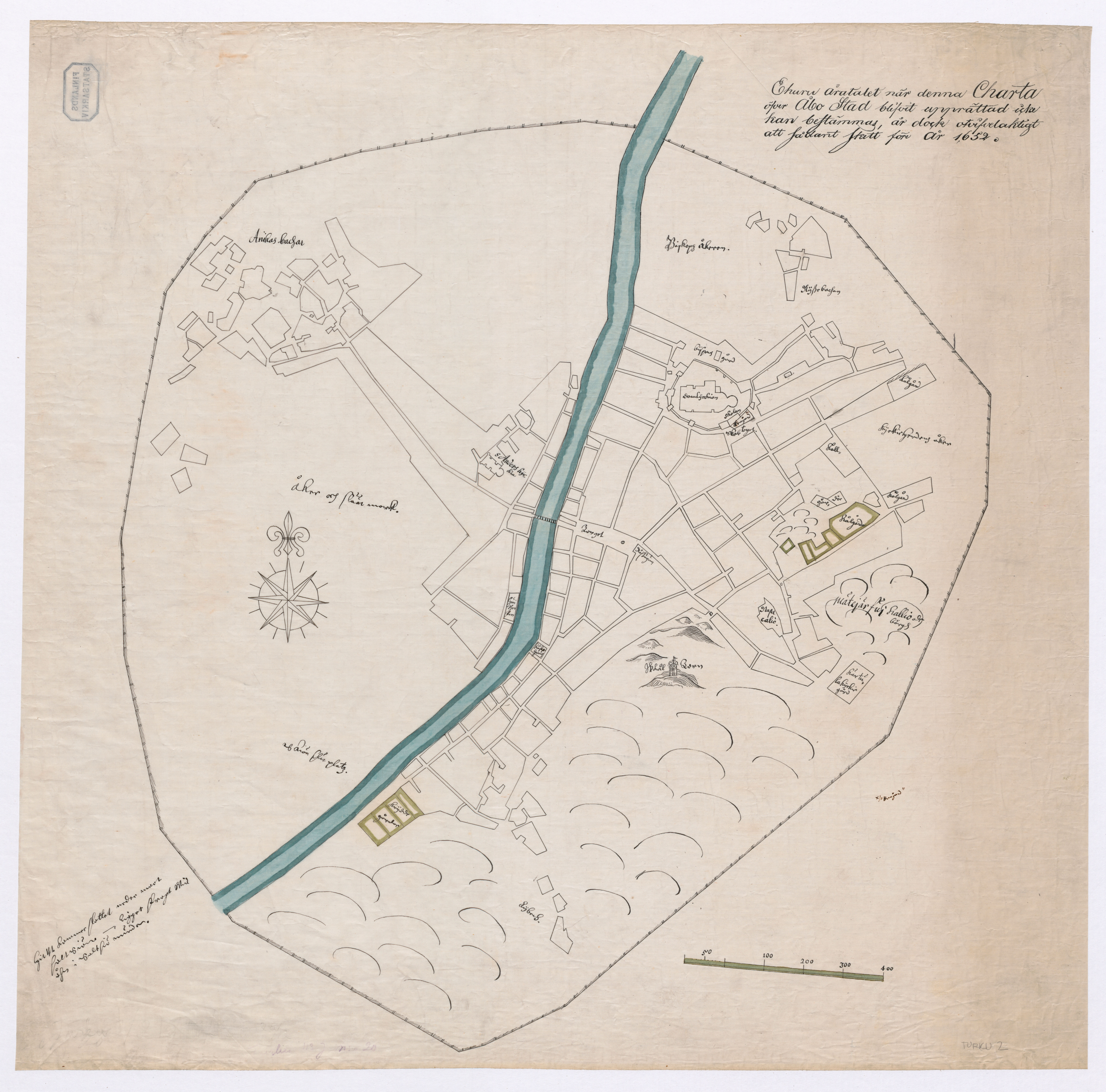
Map of Åbo from 1634 by Olof Gangius

Aiding Duke Charles, burghers in Åbo infiltrated the city's castle; the styckjunkar within had also sided with Charles, and many troops did so secretly. The burghers also managed to get the sailors to support Charles. Desperate, the nobility was forced to intimidate the troops into defending, and during a general muster, they were asked if they intended to remain loyal to Sigismund. Everyone except one soldier affirmed their loyalty. The soldier was executed on the spot, and his body was dissected and impaled on stakes around the courtyard. An outward show of discipline was maintained, though the fleet could not be subdued, and thus the sailors were not allowed to face Charles' forces. As they could not use the fleet, the nobility confiscated the cannons from them, using them for the castle's defense instead.

Using the cannons, the garrison repelled a landing into the city and damaged several ships. However, they were not able to prevent Charles from landing his troops further away at Ruskiakallio on 7 September. While trying to prevent the landing, troops under Arvid Stålarm engaged in a battle with Charles' forces, ending in a defeat for Stålarm, whereafter he had to withdraw. In total, Charles had twelve fähnlein of infantry and 500 cavalry, which spread through the surrounding areas, plundering noble-owned properties. Multiple demands for capitulation were sent to the castle. On 9 September, when both sides attempted negotiations at Kuppiskällan, Arvid Stålarm moved his troops into combat formation, and the two sides clashed, ending in another defeat for Stålarm, forcing him to withdraw again. This left the castle under the command of Bengt Severinsson, Ebba Stenbock, and Hans Eriksson.

As a result of the failed negotiations, the city was formally besieged on 11 September. Cannons from Charles' fleet were brought inland, where both sides began bombarding each other, causing heavy casualties on both sides. As a consequence of his attempts to prevent a landing, Arvid Stålarm and his men were cut off from the castle. He planned on attacking Charles' forces once he had gathered more men, but he faced desertions and was eventually forced to dissolve his force on 20 September. Charles' forces built several sconces, notably on Qvarnberget, Wikkiläbacken, and Korpolaisberget, initially leading to Charles' forces suffering heavy casualties before the trenches were deep enough to grant them ample cover.

In mid-September, Hans Hansson brought reinforcements to Charles, and people living in the area around Åbo took up arms on the side of Charles. The garrison began splintering from the inside, which could not be stopped by either Bengt Severinsson or Anders Larsson. Not even the widow of the late Klas Fleming, Ebba Stenbock, could do much. Bengt Severinsson was also accused of pocketing the garrison's pay. Additionally, a student in the castle, named Daniel Hjort, had begun convincing an increasing amount of men to desert. To find out who they could trust, the garrison's men were gathered in the courtyard. Those who pledged their loyalty to Sigismund were promised generous rewards, while those who did not were allowed free departure to Charles' camp. Despite multiple sorties and bombardments against the besieging army, the garrison suffered from daily desertions.

=== Negotiations for surrender ===
On 23 September, Charles once again demanded the castle's surrender, which was refused. Following the refusal, he reinforced his earthworks and continued bombarding the castle, and a seventh sconce began construction to allow for an assault. Two breaches had already been made in the wall, and the upper part of the castle's tower had collapsed. On 29 September, the garrison offered to negotiate a capitulation. Initially, two lower-ranking officers met with Charles and quickly agreed on a prisoner exchange. Charles' terms stipulated that if the castle surrendered, no member of the garrison would be harmed unless legally convicted. Negotiations were suspended for the night, and on 30 September, the garrison presented their terms. They stated that, although they had sworn an oath to prevent Charles from capturing the castle, they would surrender it because they could not defend it. Furthermore, the prisoners released by Charles had sworn an oath that his intentions were solely for the good of the realm, seeking control of the castle and Finland. Additionally, they requested that the capitulation be postponed until Sigismund could return and for the garrison to be allowed to return to their homes unharmed.

Charles rejected the last of these terms, and, to the garrison's surprise, his troops seized control of the castle's outerworks, which had been left unmanned during the negotiations. His troops also took control of the castle's tower. Despite this, the gate to the castle remained shut for another two hours while they negotiated terms. As they could not get better terms, the garrison finally capitulated on 30 September, having been reduced to around 800 men from its original strength, which was greater than a thousand. The surviving soldiers in the garrison were taken as prisoners of war. By comparison, Charles suffered 260 killed.

== Aftermath ==
After capitulating, Ebba Stenbock led Charles to the castle's church, where Klas Fleming's coffin was opened. According to legend, Charles pulled on Fleming's beard, saying that if Fleming was not dead, his head would not be secure. In response, Ebba Stenbock said "If my blessed lord had lived, His Grace would never have come in here". This scene was depicted in a painting by Albert Edelfelt in 1878, named Duke Karl Insulting the Corpse of Klas Fleming. However, the story was most likely made up, as it was only mentioned in later sources. Historian Lars Ericson Wolke additionally noted that the story was most likely meant to describe Charles' "unrelenting hatred" toward his enemies.

Despite capturing Åbo, Charles was forced to return to Sweden on 26 October, as the sea was about to freeze over and rumours had begun spreading that Sigismund was on his way to Sweden. He brought the commanders with him back to Sweden as a prisoners. In his place, Åbo was left in the command of Klas Hermansson Fleming, Göran Henriksson, and Lars Fleming. However, Åbo quickly fell back into the hands of Arvid Stålarm after he had negotiated its surrender at Christmas 1597.

== See also ==
- Siege of Åbo (1563) – Conflict between Eric XIV and Duke John
- Cudgel War – 1596–1597 peasant uprising in Finland
