= Axel Kurck =

Swedish noble and soldier (1555–1630)

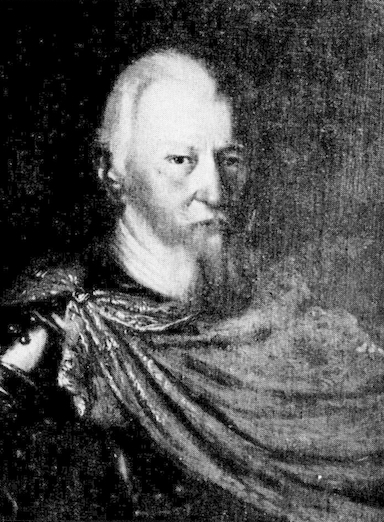
Axel Kurck (Akseli Kurki)

Axel Jönsson Kurck (also known as Akseli Kurki in Finnish), born 1555, died 30 March 1630 in Nakkila) was a colonel in the Swedish army and nobleman. He was a member of the Kurki of Laukko family.

Since 1582 Kurck was the lord of Koporye fortress in Ingria and later served as a judge in the Finnish hundreds of Upper Satakunta and Vehmaa. In 1593 he was invested with the lordship of Hermann Castle in Narva, Estonia. 20 November 1598 King Sigismund named him as the commander-in-chief of Finland.

At the war between Duke Charles and Sigismund he was defeated on 29 August 1599 by the troops of Duke Charles in Marttila, Finland. Kurck retreated to the Karelian town of Viborg (now Vyborg, Russia) and was later captured during its siege. He was sentenced to death in Åbo (Fi. Turku), but managed to survive the Åbo Bloodbath on which 14 supporters of Sigismund were beheaded. Kurck and captain Arvid Stålarm were sent to Linköping where they were tried and condemned along with other captured opposition leaders. Stålarm and Kurck also survived the subsequent Linköping bloodbath but remained imprisoned in the Gripsholm Castle. Kurck was released in September 1602, while Stålarm died in prison in 1620. During the Ingrian War Kurck served as a captain under the command of Jacob De la Gardie.

Kurck spent his last years at the Anola estate in Nakkila, Sweden (now Finland). He is buried at the St. Olaf's Church in the Western Finnish town of Ulvila.
