= Åbo Bloodbath =

1599 public execution in Turku (Åbo), Finland

Coordinates: 60°27′6″N 22°16′1″E

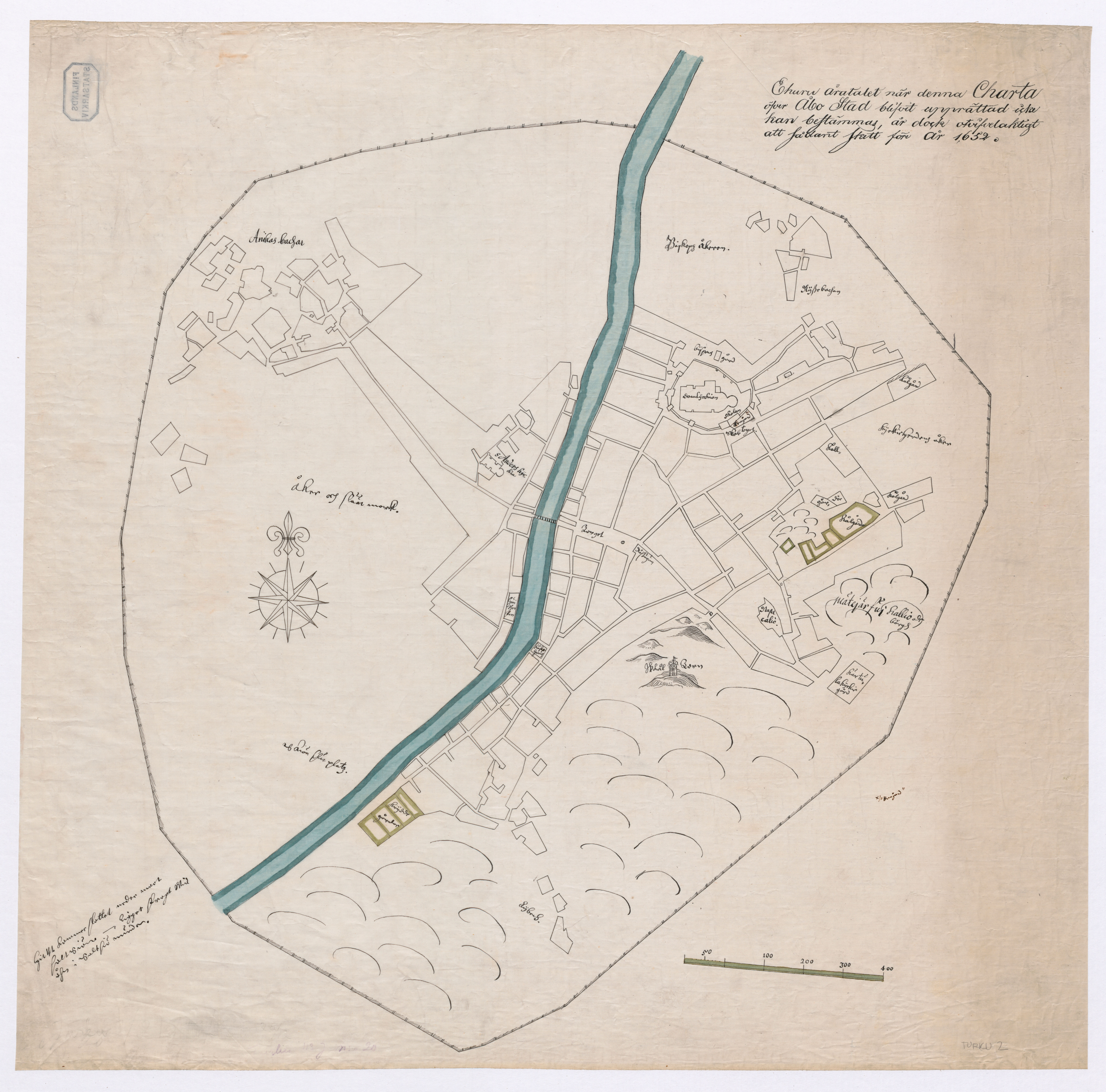
Map of Turku (Åbo) in 1634. The massacre took place in the Old Great Square, to the east of the bend in the Aura River.

The Åbo Bloodbath (Swedish: Åbo blodbad; Finnish: Turun verilöyly) of 10 November 1599 was a public execution in the town of Turku (Åbo), Finland, then part of the Kingdom of Sweden, in the context of the war against Sigismund. Sweden was by then in the final phase of a civil war, with one faction supporting King Sigismund III Vasa, who also was King and Grand Duke of Poland–Lithuania, and another faction supporting Duke Charles of Södermanland, the later Charles IX, Sigismund's paternal uncle. After winning the upper hand in the dispute, Charles crushed the last resistance to his rule, particularly in Finland, while Sigismund had already retreated to Poland.

The forces opposing Charles in Finland were led by Arvid Stålarm and Axel Kurck (Kurk), who both became Charles's prisoners after the surrender of Åbo castle and further strongholds. Together with other prisoners, including two sons of Finland's previous commander, Clas (Klaus) Fleming, they were tried by a jury speedily assembled from Charles' followers, and sentenced to death. Fleming's sons and twelve others were then beheaded in Åbo's Town Hall Square, while Stålarm and Kurck were sent to Linköping where they were tried and condemned again along with other captured opposition leaders. However, Stålarm and Kurck also survived the subsequent Linköping Bloodbath.

== Trial and executions ==
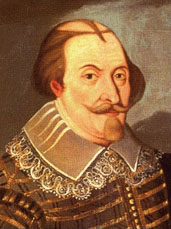
Charles (IX)

After the Battle of Stångebro had decided the war between Duke Charles, regent of Sweden, and the Swedish king Sigismund III Vasa in Charles' favor, several fortresses in the east of the Swedish kingdom were still held by members of the noble opposition to Duke Charles, who were loyal to the deposed king and had pursued anti-peasant actions in the Cudgel War, where Charles had sympathized with the peasants. These last strongholds of the opposition, commanded by Arvid Stålarm and Axel Kurck (also Kurk), included Åbo, Helsingfors (Helsinki) and Viborg (Vyborg, Viipuri, Вы́борг), all of which were subsequently taken in the course of Charles' Finnish campaign in the second half of 1599. When Charles' forces besieged Åbo, the defendants surrendered when assured by Charles that in the inevitable trial after the siege, they were to be tried by a diet of the estates.

Charles, however, quickly assembled a court of thirty-seven jurors loyal to him, and an indictment was ready by 7 November. Among the judges were the nobles Count Mauritz Leijonhufvud, Count Magnus Brahe, Svante and Nils Turesson Bielke of Salstad, and admiral Joakim Scheel; also the burghers Mickel Krank, Nils Torkelsson, Hans Rantala and Klas Thomasson. The tribunal sentenced to death a number of the indicted on 9 November.

Fourteen of those were executed on 10 November in Åbo's Town Hall Square, where they were led in a procession from their prison in Åbo castle. The first to be beheaded was Johan Fleming, son of Clas (Klaus) Fleming, whose last words according to Yrjö Koskinen were a farewell to his friends and a statement about his innocence and the bloodthirst of Duke Charles. Michael Roberts says that Charles "permitted himself the private luxury" of executing Johan in person. While this is not mentioned by Koskinen, he nevertheless reports a dispute between Johan and Charles before the executions took place, where Johan had upset Charles by remaining loyal to "his god and his king". Koskinen also says that Johan's half-brother Olof Klasson wanted to follow Johan immediately to have their blood mixed, but that he was not permitted to do so as his execution was scheduled to be the fifth.

In addition to Fleming and Klasson, the following persons were executed: the nobles Sten Fincke of Peipot, Hartvig Henriksson of Wuoltis, Krister Mattsson Björnram, Mikael Påvelsson Munck of Nuhiala and Nils Ivarsson; furthermore the knektehöfvitsmannen Sigfrid Sigfridsson, Jakob Möl, Hans Jänis, Eskil Jakobsson, Herman Hansson and others. Some people, like one of the Fleming's military unit's, Lieutenant Hans Osara, from Hämeenkyrö, were executed a year or two after the Åbo Blootbath.

Stålarm and Kurck, who had likewise received death sentences, were instead carried to Linköping only to be tried again in what led to the Linköping Bloodbath, where they were again condemned to death but reprieved.

== In legend and fiction ==
In 1862, Josef Julius Wecksell used the events in Åbo as a basis for his fictitious play Daniel Hjort. Hjort, among the defendants of the castle and a close friend of Fleming, defects to Charles for ideological reasons, opens the gates and takes part in the bloodbath. Hjort is then killed by Fleming's son, Olof. The play is the only one ever written by Wecksell, whose writing career was put to an end by a mental disease when he was twenty-five years old. Nevertheless, according to Schoolfield, "the play has been called the best play to be written in the Swedish language before Strindberg's Master Olof" and "still has a place in the repertoire".

== See also ==
- Cudgel War
- List of massacres in Finland
- War against Sigismund

== Sources ==
=== Bibliography ===
- Jutikkala, Eino; Pirinen, Kauko (1988). A History of Finland. Dorset Press. ISBN 0-88029-260-1.
- Koskinen, Yrjö (1864). Klubbe-kriget samt Finlands sociala tillstånd vid slutet af sextonde århundradet (in Swedish). Translated by E. O. Edlund. Helsingfors: Finska Litteratur-Sällskapets tryckeri.
- Roberts, Michael (1986) [1968]. The Early Vasas: A History of Sweden 1523–1611. Cambridge University Press Archive. p. 386. ISBN 0-521-31182-9.
- Schoolfield, G.C. (1984). "Wecksell, Josef Julius (1838–1907)". In Hochman, Stanley (ed.). McGraw-Hill Encyclopedia of World Drama. Vol. 1 (2nd ed.). VNR. p. 126. ISBN 0-07-079169-4.
