= Linköping Bloodbath =

1600 public execution of Swedish nobles

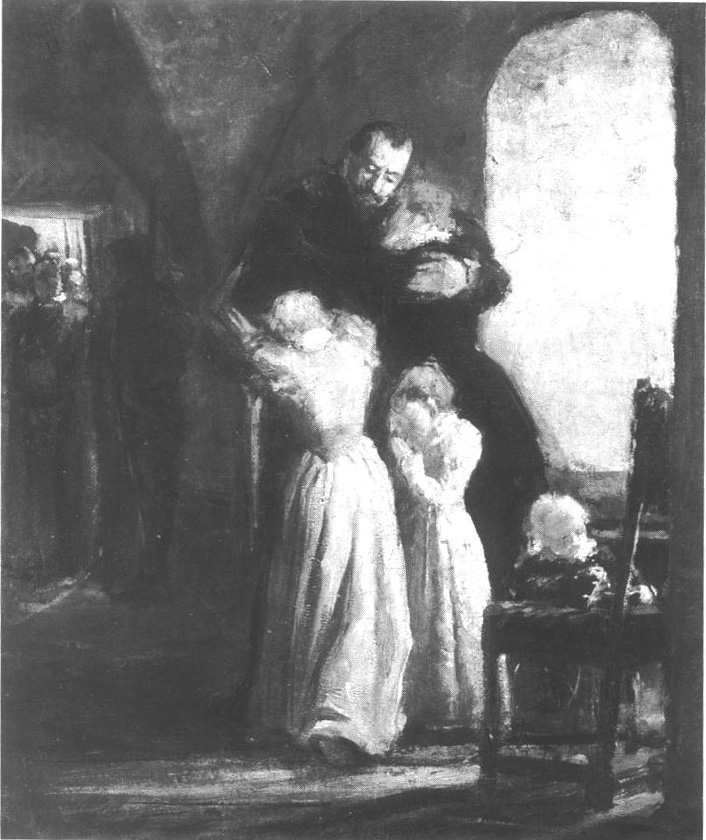
- Gustaf Axelsson Baner bids farewell to his family before he is beheaded in Linköping Square, painting by Fanny Brate
- Native name: Linköpings blodbad
- Date: 20 March 1600
- Location: Linköping, Östergötland, Sweden
- Type: Massacre
- Cause: War against Sigismund
- Deaths: 5

The Linköping Bloodbath (Swedish: Linköpings blodbad) on 20 March 1600 was the public execution by beheading of five Swedish nobles in the aftermath of the War against Sigismund (1598–1599), which resulted in the de facto deposition of the Polish and Swedish King Sigismund III Vasa as king of Sweden. The five were advisors to Catholic Sigismund or political opponents of the latter's uncle and adversary, the Swedish regent Duke Charles.

== Detention, trial and execution ==
King Sigismund, eldest son to King John III, had inherited the crown from his father and been crowned the rightful king of Sweden after giving assurances that he would not act to aid the Catholic cause in Sweden during the mounting religious turmoil of the Counter-Reformation in the late 16th century. He violated the agreement, setting off civil war in Sweden. After trying to manage the Swedish situation from afar, Sigismund invaded with a mercenary army after receiving permission from the Polish legislature, and initially was successful. The turning point of his Swedish campaign was the Battle of Stångebro on 25 September 1598, also known as the Battle of Linköping, where Sigismund became trapped in an unfavourable position and had to agree to a truce with Charles. One of Charles' conditions for the truce was the handing over of Swedish privy counsellors from Sigismund's camp. Sigismund complied.

Most prominent among these Swedish senators was the Chancellor of Sweden, Erik Sparre. While Charles did not detain Sigismund as well, he forced him to agree to the Treaty of Linköping and to agree that their dispute would be settled by a future Riksdag of the Estates in Stockholm. Sigismund retreated to the port of Kalmar, but instead of sailing to Stockholm, he took his sister Anna, left for Danzig in the Polish–Lithuanian Commonwealth and never returned to Sweden again. Charles then crushed the remaining military opposition from forces loyal to Sigismund and those nobles who had previously taken control of Finland in the Cudgel War. During these campaigns, some nobles were tried, executed or detained. Executions, including the so-called Åbo Bloodbath, were carried out through decapitation or impalement, Charles himself executed a son of his adversary Clas Fleming.

When in March 1600 a riksdag met in Linköping, Charles, who was meanwhile created omnipotent ruler of Sweden and had repeatedly been offered the Swedish crown, set up a court to try his remaining prisoners. The court, headed by Erik Brahe and Count Axel Leijonhufvud consisted of 155 members, with Charles himself being the prosecutor. Tried were six nobles captured in Stångebro and two Finnish nobles captured later, including Arvid Stålarm, who in 1598 had intended to aid Sigismund in Stångebro, but aborted the action when his army had reached Stockholm from Finland only after Sigismund had accepted the aforementioned truce. The other Finnish noble, Axel Kurck, was sentenced to death along with Stålarm in Finland already, but the verdict had been suspended to again try them in Linköping. These eight noblemen were eventually sentenced to death, but three of them were pardoned.

The noblemen publicly executed on the Linköping market square on 20 March 1600 were:

1. Erik Sparre – the Chancellor of Sweden and a senator in the Riksens ständer
2. Ture Nilsson Bielke – a senator in the Riksens ständer
3. Gustaf Banér – a senator in the Riksens ständer and father of Gustavus Adolphus' Field Marshal Johan Banér
4. Sten Banér – a senator in the Riksens ständer who had previously survived the Sture murders
5. Bengt Falck – a senator in the Riksens ständer

== Aftermath ==
Sigismund, who was allowed to return to the Polish–Lithuanian Commonwealth, did not relinquish his desire to regain the throne of Sweden. This attitude led to a series of Polish–Swedish wars, that culminated during the reign of his son, John II Casimir of Poland, with the giant Swedish invasion of Poland known as the Deluge, ending the golden age of the Commonwealth. On 24 July 1599, the Riksens ständer (Riksdag) in Stockholm officially dethroned Sigismund and named Charles IX Vasa as regent, and the Polish–Swedish union was dissolved after barely seven years of existence. Subsequently, Charles IX of Sweden was named by the Riksens ständer as the new King of Sweden in 1604, and the crown would pass to Gustavus II Adolphus, who established his early reputation as an outstanding military leader in campaigns during the early years of the Polish–Swedish wars. Indirectly, the religious conflict in Sweden led to the Swedish Empire as Gustavus Adolphus and his generals became militant in the cause of Protestants in the Holy Roman Empire.

== See also ==
- Charles IX of Sweden
- Pacta conventa
- Polish–Lithuanian Commonwealth
- Polish–Swedish union
- Privy Council of Sweden
- War against Sigismund
- Sigrid Banér

== Sources ==
=== Bibliography ===
- Peterson, Gary Dean (2007). Warrior Kings of Sweden: The Rise of an Empire in the Sixteenth and Seventeenth Centuries. McFarland. ISBN 978-0-7864-2873-1.
- Roberts, Michael (1986) [1968]. The Early Vasas: A History of Sweden 1523–1611. Cambridge University Press Archive. ISBN 0-521-31182-9.
- Samuelson, Jan (1993). Aristokrat eller förädlad bonde? Det svenska frälsets ekonomi, politik och sociala förbindelser under tiden 1523–1611 (in Swedish). Lund University Press. ISBN 91-7966-248-X.
