= Siege of Åbo (1563) =

Conflict between Eric XIV and Duke John

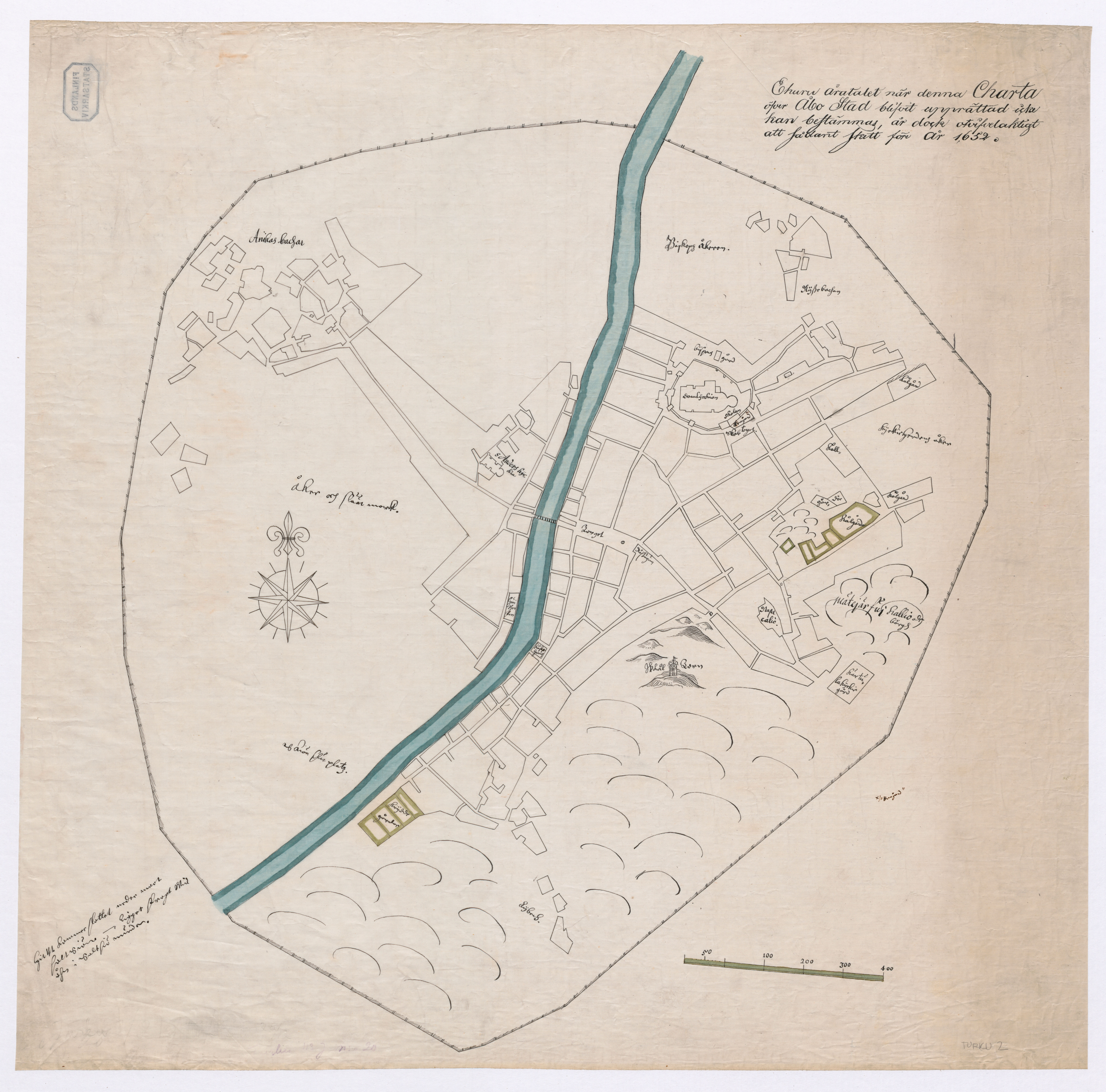
- Map of Åbo by Olof Gangius from 1634
| Date | Summer 1563 – August 12, 1563 |
| Location | Åbo (Turku), Finland, Kingdom of Sweden 60°27′06″N 22°16′01″E |
| Result | Victory for Eric XIV |
| Territorial changes | Åbo is captured by the royal army |

Belligerents
| Sweden | Forces under Duke John |

Commanders and leaders
| Erik XIV; Klaus Fleming | Duke John (POW); Catherine Jagiellon (POW); Klas Andersson (executed) |

Units involved
| Unknown | Åbo garrison |

Strength
| Several thousand | 1,200 in the beginning 350 in the end |

Casualties and losses
| Unknown | 850 killed or deserted |

The siege of Åbo (1563) was a siege of Åbo (Turku) by the royal army under King Eric XIV of Sweden against his brother Duke John of Finland (later King John III) in 1563.

== Background ==
In Stockholm, the brothers Eric XIV and Duke John were competing in who could have the most prestigious court. In the end, the court in Åbo had a more international atmosphere. John's wife Catherine Jagiellon had proven to be a threat to the Swedish government since she was a Catholic and from the Polish–Lithuanian Commonwealth. The Swedish government had begun seeing the Commonwealth as a Swedish enemy and had forbidden John from marrying her, however, this had been refused by John, which led to the parliament announcing him as a traitor and sentencing him to death.

== Siege ==
In the spring of 1563, open conflict broke out between Eric XIV and Duke John, with Eric beginning the siege in the summer. Eric's royal army, which consisted of a few thousand, besieged Åbo with all its "court ladies, monks, and dwarves". John's army, which consisted of around 1,200 men, defended the castle with firebombs, which were sacks filled with burning tar, and the royal army finished surrounding the castle on August 3 when it occupied Korpolaisberget with a storm. The cannon fire from the royal army also heavily damaged the castle walls, leading to the defenders quickly being forced to surrender on August 12. John's army had been reduced to a mere 350 soldiers after a majority of it had been killed or deserted.

== Aftermath ==
After the capitulation, both John and Catherine were taken prisoner. The royal troops also plundered the already damaged Åbo, with more soldiers doing the same to gardens belonging to the duke's family.

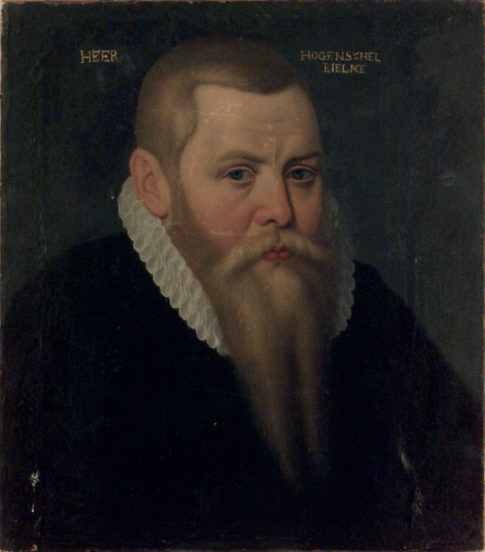
Hogenskild Bielke

A contemporary report from the time says that one of the royal officers, Anders Nilsson, received an order to murder John. When Hogenskild Bielke and other higher-ranking officers entered John's room, Anders was standing among them with a secret blade in his hand, however, before he had a chance to carry out the murder, he was taken out of the room by Klas Boije.
