= Arvid Stålarm the Younger =

Swedish noble and soldier (d. 1620)

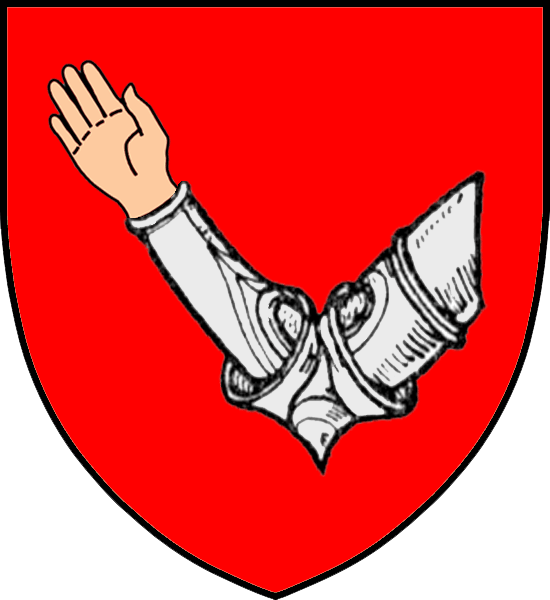
Coat of arms of the Stålarm family

Arvid Stålarm, actually Arvid Eriksson (Stålarm) till Lindö i Tenala (c. 1540 or 1549 – May 1620, Gripsholm Castle) was a Swedish noble and soldier from the Finland-based Stålarm family. He is sometimes called "the Younger" to distinguish him from his grandfather and namesake who died in 1529.

In his early career, Arvid Stålarm served as a captain in the Swedish navy. Later, he was promoted admiral, governor in Narva and Finland, and during the War against Sigismund led Finnish forces loyal to Sigismund against the latter's opponent and successor duke Charles of Södermanland, the later king Charles IX. Stålarm was taken prisoner and condemned to death in the Åbo bloodbath (1599) and again in the Linköping bloodbath (1600), but both times was spared from execution and remained in prison.

In 1602, during the Polish–Swedish War (1600–11), he was released to command the Swedish forces in Livonia, who by then were in a precarious state and position. Stålarm received ambiguous orders and was unable to turn the tide. After a major defeat in September 1604, Charles removed him from the command, and Stålarm was again tried and condemned to death in the spring of 1605. He was, however, again spared, and spent the rest of his life as Charles' prisoner at Gripsholm Castle.

== Family ==
Arvid Eriksson till Lindö i Tenala was born into the Finland-Swedish Stålarm family around the years 1540 or 1549. He was the son of Erik Arvidsson (Stålarm, died 1569, son of the elder Arvid Eriksson Stålarm and Christina Knutsdotter) and Beata Nilsdotter Grabbe, her husband's step-sister, daughter of Nils Magnusson Grabbe the Elder and his first wife, Elin Claesdotter (Christina Knutsdotter became Nils Magnusson's second wife). On 9 July 1569, he married Elin Fleming, a daughter of Herman Fleming and Gertrud Håkansdotter Hand.

Table: Ancestry

Arvid Eriksson Stålarm the Elder	I. (1515)	Christina Knutsdotter	II.	Nils Magnusson Grabbe	I.	Elin Claesdotter
Arvid Eriksson Stålarm the Elder		Christina Knutsdotter		Nils Magnusson Grabbe	.	Elin Claesdotter
					.
	Erik Arvidsson Stålarm	1530			Beata Nilsdotter Grabbe		Herman Fleming		Gertrud Håkansdotter Hand
	Erik Arvidsson Stålarm				Beata Nilsdotter Grabbe		Herman Fleming	.	Gertrud Håkansdotter Hand
								.
		Arvid Eriksson Stålarm the Younger			9 July 1579			Elin Fleming
		Arvid Eriksson Stålarm the Younger			.			Elin Fleming

Stålarm family
Grabbe family
Fleming family

== Naval, Narva, Finnish and Livonian commands, first detention ==
Stålarm was häradshöfding (chief administrator of a härad) in Nyslotts (Savonlinna) län in 1583. He served in the Royal Swedish navy as a captain, and was promoted admiral of the Finnish navy in 1588. In 1590, at the beginning of the Russo-Swedish War (1590–1595), he was appointed supreme commander in Narva, where he became governor in 1592. In addition, he became häradshövding of Sexmäki (Sääksmäki) in 1593 and of Savolax (Savonia) in 1594. In the same year, king Sigismund confirmed Stålarm as his governor in Narva and also appointed him commander of all forces in Finland and Livonia, after he had made Stålarm his envoy to the Russian tsardom already in 1593. Upon the death of översteamiral (supreme admiral) Clas (Klaus) Fleming in 1597, he was given supreme command over the naval and land forces in Finland by king Sigismund and became governor of "all Finland." During the War against Sigismund, he supported Sigismund against his adversary duke Charles of Södermanland.

In 1597, Charles' forces invaded Finland and in September took from Stålarm the town of Åbo (Turku), where he gathered the Finnish estates and had them accept his rule. Stålarm however re-took Åbo when Charles left in October, making Finland again one of the strongholds of Sigismund loyalists with the peasantry however tending to support Charles.

In 1598, Sigismund planned to plunge Charles in a two-fold attack, with Sigismund attacking him from the south and Stålarm's forces from Finland and Uppland attacking from the north. Three days before Stålarm arrived in Stockholm, however, Sigismund had already been forced to agree to an unfavourable truce in the Treaty of Linköping of 28 September, after Charles had won the upper hand in the Battle of Stångebro. Stålarm retreated to Finland without the Uppland troops, who defected to Charles, Sigismund retreated to Poland–Lithuania and never returned, and Charles, who had already detained the leading loyalists at Linköping, subsequently cleared the western parts of the Swedish kingdom of his opponents before he started a campaign to control the remaining loyalist strongholds in the east.

Together with Axel Kurck (Kurk), Stålarm commanded the forces in Finland, but was taken prisoner after Charles' forces had conquered the loyalist strongholds there in September and October 1599. Along with other opposition members, Stålarm was sentenced to death by a jury assembled from thirty-seven of Charles' followers in Åbo, but together with Kurck was spared from decapitation during the subsequent Åbo bloodbath of 10 November. Instead, Stålarm and Kurck were transferred first to Stockholm and later to Linköping, where they were again tried and sentenced to death by a jury of 155 men during the riksdag of the estates of March 1600. Both were already led to the execution site in what became known as the Linköping bloodbath, but their execution was postponed and Stålarm remained Charles' prisoner until 1602.

== Livonian command, second detention ==
Stålarm's temporary release in 1602 was due to difficulties Charles encountered in his war against Poland–Lithuania in the Duchy of Livonia. There, Charles had attracted the renowned John of Nassau to command his forces in July 1601. John began to re-organize the Swedish forces in Livonia according to the Dutch model, but due to shortages in equipment, numbers and other problems he gave up and left for Holland in the summer of 1602. He left behind an army reduced to the Livonian strongholds of Dorpat (Tartu) and Pernau (Pärnu) and even losing ground in famine-plagued Swedish Estonia, which Michal Roberts described as follows: "The Dutch tactics were worse than useless—indeed, they were positively dangerous—as long as the men had an inferior firearm and no pike-hedge behind which they could take cover. [...] The army had been half-reformed, and the last state of it was arguably worse than the first." Charles then released Stålarm from prison to take over John of Nasau's command.

Stålarm's opponent in Livonia was the Lithuanian hetman Jan Karol Chodkiewicz, whose forces until mid-1603 had taken Dorpat and most of Estonia, except for the Reval (Tallinn) and Narva regions, from Stålarm. Charles ordered Stålarm to take a strictly defensive position and avoid battle until he had raised a mercenary army, but according to Roberts, "simultaneously harassed him with demands for action, and bitterly criticized him when action proved unsuccessful." Stålarm, though not authorized by Charles, wanted to force a decision in the battle of Weissenstein (Paide) on 15 September 1604, but was utterly defeated by Chodkiewicz. Charles removed Stålarm from the Livonian command, which he took over himself.

In the spring of 1605, Stålarm once again faced a court. Charles had summoned a riksdag in Stockholm after he became aware of an aristocratic conspiracy by the beginning of the year, and Stålarm was among the real and perceived opponents whom Charles had tried by a tribunal composed of 274 men during the riksdag. The tribunal sentenced Stålarm to death, whereupon he was tortured and again brought to the execution site. While the verdict was again not carried out, Stålarm spent the rest of his life imprisoned and died in May 1620 in Gripsholm Castle.

== Sources ==
=== Bibliography ===
- Anrep, Gabriel (1864). Svenska adelns ättar-taflor. Vol. 4. Stockholm: Nordstedt.
- Ekberg, Henrik, ed. (1985). Uppslagsverket Finland. Vol. 3. Schildt. ISBN 951-50-0331-8.
- Glete, Jan (2009). Swedish Naval Administration, 1521-1721. Resource Flows and Organisational Capabilities. BRILL. ISBN 978-90-04-17916-5.
- Koskinen, Yrjö (1864). Klubbe-kriget samt Finlands sociala tillstånd vid slutet af sextonde århundradet [translated into Swedish by E. O. Edlund]. Helsingfors: Finska Litteratur-Sällskapets tryckeri.
- Malmberg, Gustaf; Nordén, Arthur (1913). Vårt gamla Norrköping. Bidrag till dess kulturhistoria. Lundberg.
- Peterson, Gary Dean (2007). Warrior kings of Sweden. The rise of an empire in the sixteenth and seventeenth centuries. Jefferson, North Carolina: McFarland. ISBN 978-0-7864-2873-1.
- Roberts, Michael (1986) [1968]. The Early Vasas. A History of Sweden 1523-1611. Cambridge University Press Archive. p. 386. ISBN 0-521-31182-9.
