= Battle of Stegeborg =

Part of the War Against Sigismund

Coordinates: 58°26′3″N 16°35′54″E

- Part of the War against Sigismund
| Date | September 18, 1598 |
| Location | near Stegeborg Castle, Sweden |
| Result | Union victory |

Belligerents
| Polish–Swedish union | Swedish separatists |

Commanders and leaders
| King Sigismund | Duke Charles |

Strength
| 4,000–6,000 men | 7,100–10,000 men |

Casualties and losses
| 30–40 killed | 300 killed |

The Battle of Stegeborg took place in a meadow near Stegeborg Castle, Sweden on September 18 (N.S.), or September 8 (O.S.), 1598. It is part of the so-called War against Sigismund, in turn part of the Polish–Swedish Wars.

Sigismund, King of Poland and Sweden, tried to put down a rebellion by Duke Charles. The armies of King Sigismund III Vasa and Charles met near the Stegeborg. The king's mercenaries easily stopped the untrained troops of the Duke. The Polish cavalry attack broke Charles' army causing panic, during which they suffered heavy losses. Contrary to the opinion of Zamoyski, the king decided to stop the attack (his goal was to acquire the Swedish crown, not extermination), allowing the withdrawal of Swedish troops. In the long run, this proved to be a mistake, as the Swedish rebels regained the initiative and defeated Sigismund at the battle of Stångebro. This effectively led to the end of the Polish–Swedish union.
