= Axel Nilsson Ryning =

High Admiral and High Constable of Sweden

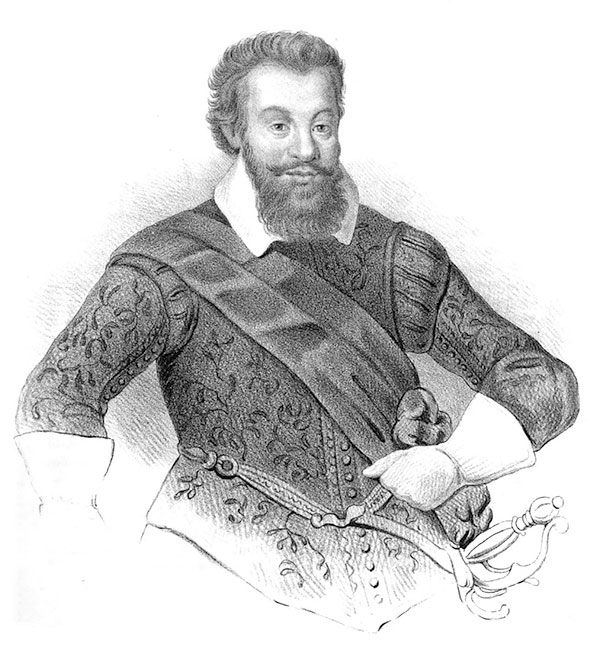
Lithograph by Johan Henric Strömer

Axel Nilsson Ryning, born 1552, died 8 January 1620, was a Swedish Lord High Admiral, Marshal, Councilor, and Baron to Tuna farm in Österåker parish in the current Österåker municipality in Österskär in Åkersberga, Stockholm county. Son of Nils Eriksson Ryning and Ingeborg Trolle.

== Biography ==
Ryning was one of Gustav II Adolf's guardians and married to Margareta Bielke, daughter of Claes Nilsson Bielke and Elin Fleming.

His activities began immediately after the death of Johan III, when he was appointed to Duke Charles' council in 1592 and in the same year mediated reconciliation between the duke and the six councilors, who in 1590 were arrested for forging stamps.

On his departure in 1594, Sigismund appointed Erik Brahe, who was a Catholic, as governor of Stockholm. In 1599, Erik Brahe was replaced by Axel Ryning and Carl Sture. In the same year, he participated in the siege of Viborg on the side of Duke Charles.

Three years later he was appointed Councilor and Admiral by the Duke and was, along with several other Swedish gentlemen, a part of The Council of State which was at the peace meeting with the Danes in Flaksjöbäck the same year 1602. Gustaf II Adolf rewarded Ryning's accomplishments by elevating him to Marshal and Lagman which was recorded in Södermanland's 1611 law saga.

At the king's coronation in 1617, Ryning was knighted.
