= Mem Castle =

- Sweden
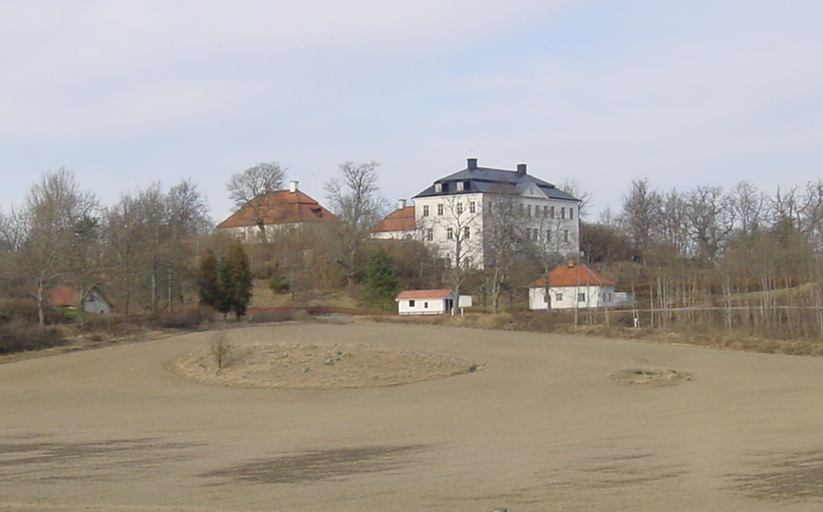
- The castle in 2002

Site information
- Type: Castle

Location
- Coordinates: 58°28′54″N 16°24′40″E

Mem Castle (Mems slott) is located at Tåby parish, Norrköping Municipality in Östergötland County Sweden. It is situated near the mouth of the Göta Canal.

== History ==
Mem dates back to 14th century. In 1572, Mem received manor status. The estate has been owned by many Swedish counts, barons and noble families. Mem was an important centre for Duke Karl, later King Charles IX of Sweden and his armed forces during the war against King Sigismund III Vasa late in the 16th century.

Two stone wing buildings with high manor roofs were built in 1730s. In the late 1790s, the main building was built around the medieval stone fortress. Another floor was built on the main building and the older building style was replaced with stepping stone gables in Gustavian style architecture.

== See also ==
- List of castles in Sweden
