= War against Sigismund =

Late 1500s Polish–Swedish conflict ending in the deposition of king Sigismund

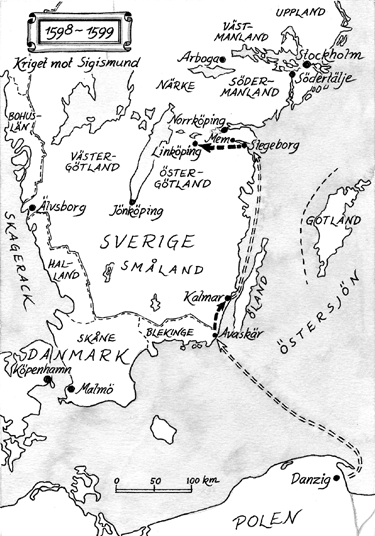
- Sigismund's campaign between 1598 and 1599
Date	1597–1599
Location	Sweden
Result	Swedish victory
Territorial changes	The Polish–Swedish union is dissolved

Belligerents
Sweden	Polish–Swedish union; Polish–Lithuanian Commonwealth

Commanders and leaders
Duke Charles	Sigismund III

The war against Sigismund (Swedish: Kriget mot Sigismund) was a war between Duke Charles, later known as King Charles IX of Sweden, and Sigismund, who was at the time the king of both Sweden and the Polish–Lithuanian Commonwealth (that is, the King of Poland and the Grand Duke of Lithuania). Lasting from 1597 to 1599, it is also called the War of Deposition against Sigismund, since the focus of the conflict was the attempt to depose the latter from the throne of Sweden. The war eventually resulted in the deposition of Sigismund (with Duke Charles taking over the government and later also acceding to the throne), the dissolution of the Polish–Swedish union, and the beginning of an eleven-year war.

== Background ==
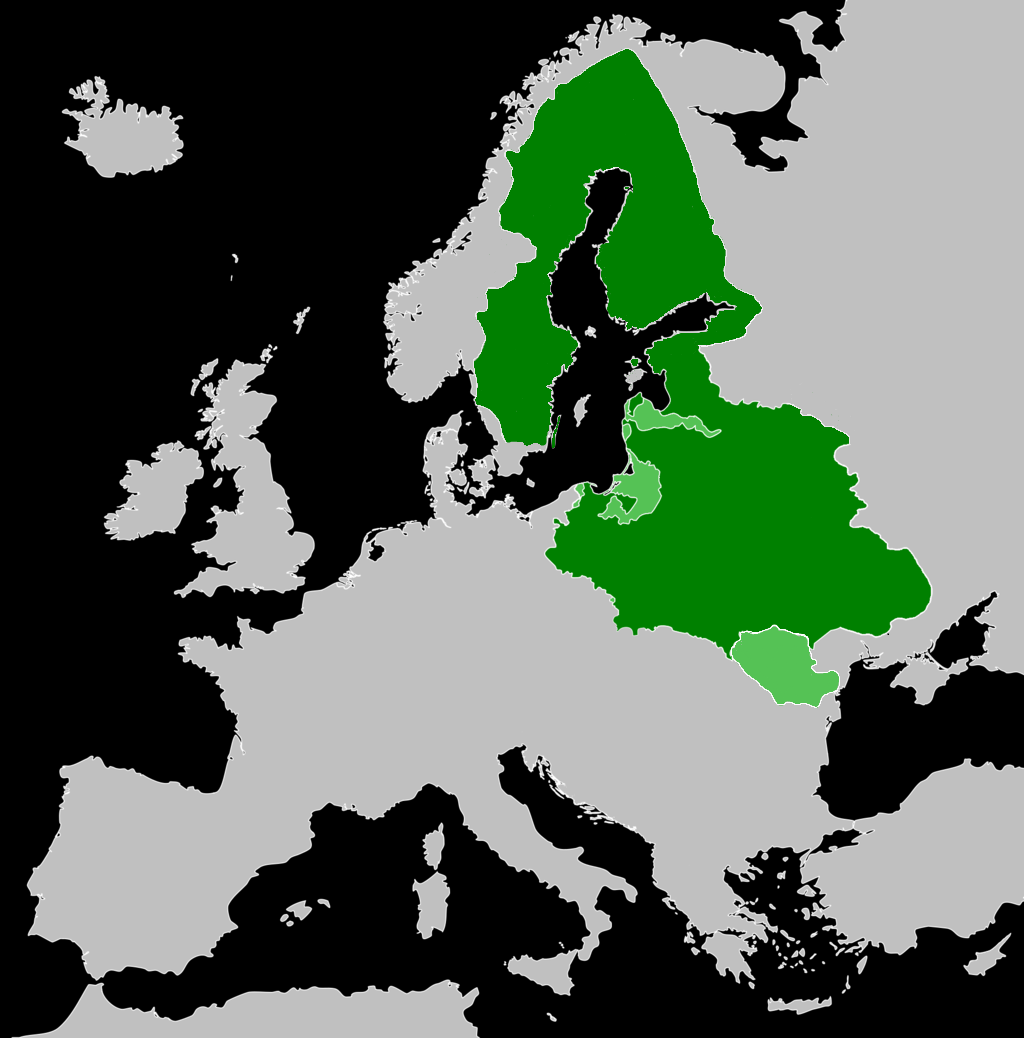
The Polish-Swedish Union in question

When Stephen Báthory died in 1586, Sigismund Vasa, son of King John III and Catherine Jagiellonica, was elected king of the Polish–Lithuanian Commonwealth in an attempt to continue the Polish–Swedish alliance, the original purpose being to confront Ivan IV "the Terrible" of Russia. Sigismund had sworn to cede Estonia to the Commonwealth.

When King John III died in 1592 his son Sigismund, King of Poland since 1587, acceded to the Swedish throne. Then conflicts arose. Duke Charles, the only living son of Gustav Vasa, did not approve the accession of Sigismund, his nephew and a Catholic, to the government of a realm that could just as well be his.

After Sigismund had been crowned King of Sweden on February 19, 1594, he decided that no Parliaments (riksdagar) could be summoned without the King's consent. Despite this, Charles summoned a Parliament at Söderköping in autumn 1595, at which he managed to get his will through. The Duke was appointed Regent with "the advice of the Council", meaning that he was to govern Sweden together with the Privy Council during the King's absence from the Realm. Soon afterwards, the nobility of Finland, led by the Sigismund-appointed Governor, Klaus Fleming, rejected these decisions. They sympathised with the King and considered Charles a rebel. As a counterattack, Charles instigated a rebellion against Fleming, the Cudgel War, among the farmers in Ostrobothnia.

Fleming managed to quell the revolt but died in April 1597. Roughly at the same time, a letter arrived from Sigismund's headquarters in Poland stating that he would not accept Charles as regent. The Duke then used a tactic which his father had employed, namely to resign from office. However, the response was not what Charles had been hoping for: the King accepted Charles's resignation and invested complete power in the Privy Council.

Despite the difficult situation, Charles summoned another illegal Parliament the same year, this time in Arboga. Only one of the Privy Councillors showed up. The reason was that Charles's goal of deposing Sigismund had now been revealed, and the men understood that a serious revolt was brewing. When Duke Charles threatened the absent men with severe punishment some of them lost courage. Erik Gustavsson Stenbock, Arvid Gustavsson Stenbock, Erik Sparre, Erik Brahe, and Sten Banér fled immediately to Sigismund.

Thus, in 1597, civil war erupted, and Duke Charles was able to assume control over a large share of the powerful castles in the country, and in this manner achieved control over almost all the Realm. The problem was Finland, where Klaus Fleming's widow guarded Åbo castle. But after psychological warfare, Charles and his followers managed to take the castle in Turku (Swedish: Åbo). It is said that when the Duke entered the castle chapel he saw Klaus Fleming's body lying in a coffin. He is said to have said: "Hadst thou now been alive, thy head would not have been in great safety." Then Fleming's widow Ebba Stenbock is said to have approached the Duke and responded: "If my late husband had been alive, Your Grace would never have entered herein."

When Sigismund found out about what had happened in Finland he lost his patience. The King could not accept Duke Charles's disrespectful actions. He decided to use force.

== The Sausage Campaign and the fall of Kalmar ==
In February 1598 Sigismund assembled an army consisting of merely 5,000 men, mostly Hungarian and German mercenaries. A larger army had been proposed, but had been dismissed since Sigismund expected Swedish forces to join him, and also did not want to come into conflict with them.

The advisers and the King expected military support from Finland and Estonia (homes of the Swedish gentry formerly commanded by baron Klaus Fleming). They also wanted help from Denmark–Norway and pro-Sigismund parts of Sweden. The diplomat Laski was dispatched, but Denmark did not show any interest.

In May, Sigismund's men started to advance northwards. The army gathered in Marienburg (Malbork), where the Livonian Baltic German Jürgen Farensbach was appointed commander. The army was to be transported from Danzig (Gdańsk) to Sweden on Swedish ships, but the Swedish Estates declined. They refused to lend him ships as long as he stayed with a foreign army. There was widespread suspicion against Sigismund and his Catholic warriors. Thus the Estates promised to protect Duke Charles and the others who rebelled against the King.

Since the Swedes refused to help with the transport, Sigismund had to buy and capture ships. When he had got hold of a hundred ships, the army was able to begin its journey to Sweden. Due to bad winds, the journey across the sea took a long time. Hence, a coordinated attack by the Finns and Sigismund's Polish soldiers could not be undertaken. The Finnish soldiers, commanded by Governor Arvid Eriksson, landed in Uppland one week ahead of Sigismund's landing. Duke Charles was on his way to Kalmar when the Finns invaded Uppland. He immediately rode towards Stockholm to defend the city.

Meanwhile, three Protestant leaders, Nicolaus Olai Bothniensis, Laurentius Paulinus Gothus, and Ericus Jacobi Skinnerus, attempted to stop the Finnish Sigismund loyalists. They were able to get the support of the farmers of Uppland, and after some minor fighting, Stålarm's men withdrew. They felt threatened by Duke Charles's navy, and were ordered not to get involved in any major battles. This event has been somewhat peculiarly named the "Sausage Campaign", because the farmers captured the Finns’ bags, containing sausages. The Sausage Campaign was a minor victory for Duke Charles. The greatest threat was coming from the south.

At the end of May 1598 Sigismund landed on Danish soil at Avaskär, near the border to Sweden. The King opened peacefully by sending the diplomat Samuel Łaski to Kalmar for negotiations. His task was to convince the city's commanders to open the gates. However, the negotiations led nowhere. Instead, the King took his soldiers and marched on Kalmar. The army halted just outside the city. The plan was to frighten the commanders into opening the gates. To make his message even more terrifying, Sigismund threatened the city with severe punishments and to withdraw the nobility of all children in the city. The propaganda worked well and Sigismund was able to make his long-desired entry on August 1.

== Decisive events ==
After the fall of Kalmar, Duke Charles found himself with major trouble on his hands. The Polish Crown army attracted Swedish followers and Stockholm, lacking military defence, was easily taken with the help of the nobility and officers of Götaland. After this event, the cavalry of Uppland joined up with Sigismund, and new forces were mobilised in Finland and Estonia.

A group of envoys from Brandenburg, Prussia, and Mecklenburg shuttled back and forth between Duke Charles's and Sigismund's camps for three weeks, trying to rescue the peace. Despite their great efforts, they failed. Sigismund sailed with his infantry to Stegeborg Castle on August 11. The cavalry went to the same place by land. Charles's situation was hardly optimal. The only bright spots were the escapement of Göran Nilsson Gyllenstierna, the ex-commander of Stockholm, from the city, and the Swedish navy's refusal to join forces with the Poles.

Łaski took Stockholm Castle and Sigismund now had control over Stockholm, the key to Sweden. However, Sigismund and his fleet sailed into a violent storm: hundreds of men were thrown overboard and perished. This incident dramatically changed the situation. Suddenly, the King was in an exposed position. On August 22 he landed at Stegeborg with merely 100 men, a position worsened by the presence of Charles's rested army nearby. Sigismund's men had already taken the fortresses of Älvsborg and Gullberg in other parts of the country. In the area around Stegeborg, Duke Charles had withdrawn to Linköping, from where he could block the troop supply to Sigismund. The King was surrounded by in all 7,000 men, including the Swedes who joined him after landing.

On August 28, Duke Charles and his men set out from Linköping. They camped at Mem, a few kilometres northwest of Stegeborg. At the same time, negotiations between the parties were ongoing. The Duke requested clear-cut answers from Sigismund, which the King interpreted as indicating that an assault was impending. His own army was in a trap, but he counted on help from other forces elsewhere. Hans Vejer was ordered to attack the Swedes in the back, from the west; another commander, Farensbach, drew up his forces in order of battle in front of the enemy. Charles immediately responded.

On the morning of September 8, the Swedes attacked Sigismund in the Battle of Stegeborg. The Swedes got off to a real nightmare start, and after a few hours, Sigismund's victory was clear. Being magnanimous, the King ordered the killing to stop, allowing Charles and his army to escape.

The losing Swedes quickly withdrew to their camp at Mem Castle. The losses amounted to 300 men, but the loss of prestige hurt Charles the most. He felt himself further humiliated by Sigismund's magnanimous behaviour. The strain grew so big that the normally stubborn Charles wanted to abdicate and escape the country with his family. A few senior officers managed to persuade Charles to stay, however.

The negotiations were resumed and they led to a two-day ceasefire. During these days, there was plenty of maneuvering among the forces. Sigismund summoned more soldiers from Poland, at the same time as the Swedish navy sailed towards the coast. The King was in charge of the situation until the Swedish navy, commanded by Joachim Scheel, anchored outside Stegeborg. Because of unfavorable winds, they had not been able to do this before. But once they had got there, the tables turned again. Since Scheel brought with him new forces, Charles could raise the stakes in the negotiations. The navy also blocked any reinforcements to Sigismund from Poland.

Sigismund immediately felt threatened and treated the blockade as a declaration of war. For this reason, he and the Poles left Stegeborg on September 20 to march on Linköping. Duke Charles's army immediately followed. The night of September 25 minor detachments skirmished with each other.

The morning of September 25, 1598 the armies clashed in a major engagement at the Battle of Stångebro. Charles offered talks again but attacked in a mist while Sigismund's men were withdrawing to their camp, which resulted in only the mercenaries fighting since his Swedes refused to fight. Duke Charles won a decisive victory which forced Sigismund to agree to harsh terms. Charles demanded that the King send home his entire army, but that he himself was to stay and await a Parliament. Also, a number of Swedes who had sided with Sigismund, including his Council supporters, were captured. These were later executed in the Linköping Bloodbath of 1600.

The agreement was sealed with a dinner between Charles and Sigismund in Linköping Castle. The King, who was under pressure, fearing for his life without his army and having realised that he had lost the political battle, fled during the coming days to Poland in late 1598. At the same time as the peace treaty was being signed in Linköping, conflicts were taking place in Dalarna. There, a pro-Sigismund bailiff, Jacob Näf, had tried to raise up the Dalecarlians against Duke Charles. Chaos ensued. Näf was executed, and the Dalecarlians set out on the so-called Neaf Campaign (1598), burning and killing down to Brunnbäck ferry. In Västergötland, Carl Carlsson Gyllenhielm, illegitimate son of Duke Charles, defeated the rebellion.

== Year 1599 ==
The King had planned to return to Sweden, which raised morale among his followers. However, these plans were never put into action. But the war had not ended. It continued for a few months, as Charles tried to reclaim the cities that were still in Sigismund's hands.

He started by appointing a new city government in Stockholm. Then he scolded the burghers, who he claimed hadn't defended the city enough. It all finished with a lot of people being jailed, among them Archbishop Abraham Angermannus, who had supported Sigismund.

Then Swedish forces, led by Carl Carlsson Gyllenhielm, marched towards Kalmar to lay siege to the city. Johan Larsson Sparre defended the walls and the castle in the hope that the King would return to Sweden. But he never got any assistance and the night between March 1 and March 2 the city was assaulted. Gyllenhielm and Samuel Nilsson were ordered to attack the north gate. Duke Charles himself led the attack on the western gate. After a short and sharp fight, Charles's men managed to scale the walls. Since the soldiers began looting the city, however, the opportunity to capture Kalmar Castle in the same stroke was lost.

The coming days, the castle proved more tenacious than expected. Johan Larsson Sparre kept the Swedes away, and finally six Polish ships arrived. These, however, were driven back by four smaller Swedish ships and Swedish artillery fire from within the city. When the Polish ships were unable to do anything, hope disappeared for the defenders inside the castle. On May 12, they surrendered. After that, Johan Larsson Sparre and his closest men, including Christoffer Andersson Stråle and Lars Andersson Rålamb, were captured.

After the assault and capture of Kalmar, the focus of the war moved to Finland. Stronghold after stronghold began to be captured in July. At first, Hans Klasson Bielkenstierna and Peder Stolpe commanded the battle against Sigismund's followers, but on August 19, Duke Charles personally assumed command. With the help of the navy, he crushed the last remnants, and by September all of Sigismund's followers were gone, detained, or executed, e.g., in the Åbo bloodbath.

== Aftermath and consequences ==
Sigismund was officially deposed from the throne of Sweden by a Parliament, Riksdag, held in Stockholm on July 24, 1599. He was given six months to say whether he wanted to send his son, Prince Ladislaus of Poland, to Sweden as his successor, under the condition that the boy would be brought up in the Evangelical faith. Otherwise the Estates would look for a new king.

In February 1600, Duke Charles summoned the Estates of the Realm to Linköping. Since Sigismund had not provided a reply, the Estates elected Duke Charles as King Charles IX of Sweden. The consequences for those who had supported Sigismund were devastating. The most prominent among them were killed by the new King, in what was called the "Linköping Bloodbath".

During the winter and spring of 1600, Charles also occupied the Swedish part of Estonia, as the castle commanders had shown sympathies towards Sigismund. Charles' invasion of Livonia led to a series of wars with Poland, starting with the Second Polish–Swedish War.

Charles accepted the crown as Charles IX in 1604.

== See also ==
- Polish–Swedish wars
  - Polish–Swedish War (1600–1611)
  - Polish–Swedish War (1617–1618)
  - Polish–Swedish War (1621–1625)
  - Polish–Swedish War (1626–1629)
