= Polish–Swedish union =

Personal union between Poland–Lithuania and Sweden

Polish–Swedish union Svensk-polska unionen (Swedish) Unia polsko-szwedzka (Polish) Unione Poloniae Sueciae (Latin)
- 1592–1599
- Motto: "Pro iure et populo" "Cor regis in manu Domini" "Coelitus sublima dantur"
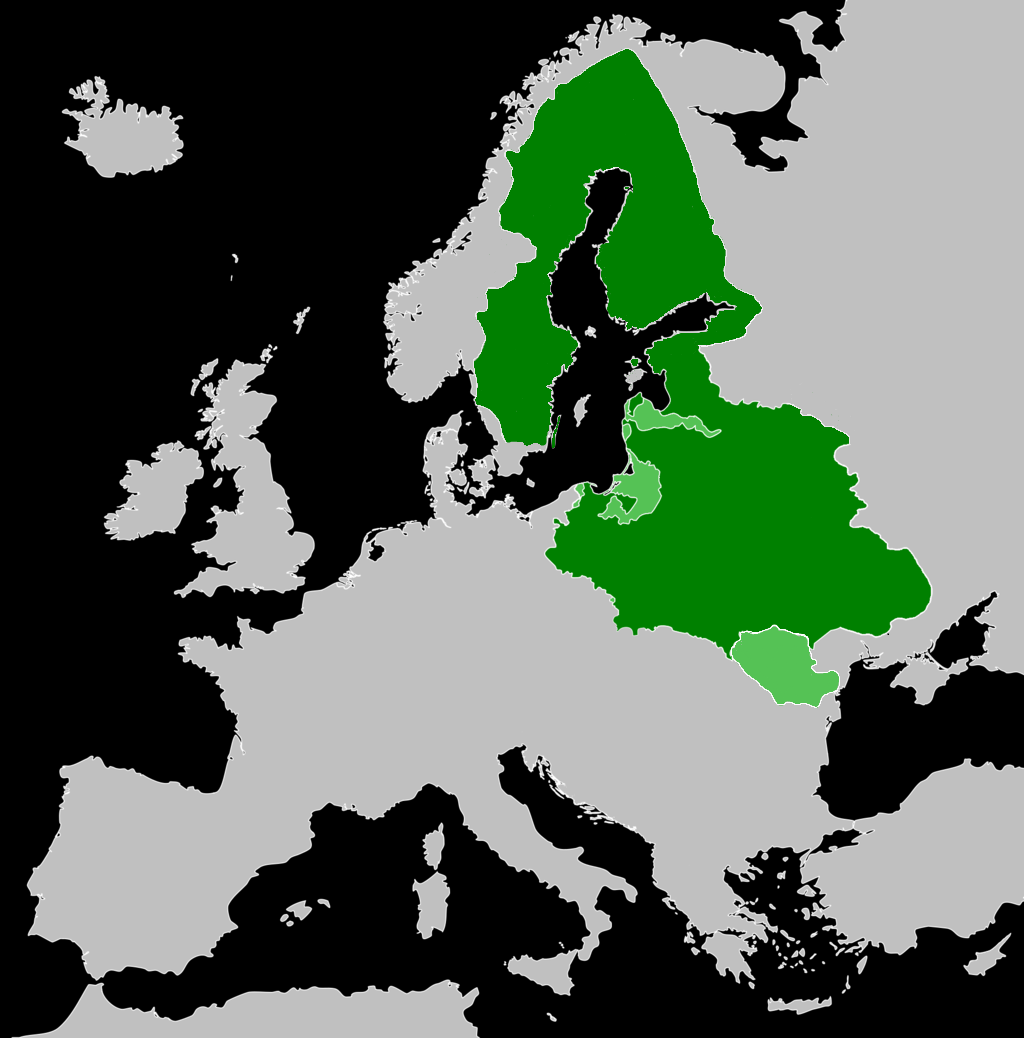
- Map of the Polish–Swedish union (dark green) with vassal states (light green) at its greatest territorial extent in 1596.
- Common languages: Latin, Polish, Swedish, and Finnish
- Government: Monarchy
- Monarch
  - 1592–1599: Sigismund III Vasa
- Historical era: Early modern period
  - Union established: 17 November 1592
  - Treaty of Teusina: 18 May 1595
  - Riksdag of 1595: 30 September 1595
  - War of Deposition: February 1598
  - Union dissolved: 24 July 1599
Preceded by	Succeeded by
Polish–Lithuanian Commonwealth; Kingdom of Sweden (1523–1611)	Polish–Lithuanian Commonwealth; Kingdom of Sweden (1523–1611)

The Polish–Swedish union was a short-lived personal union between the Polish–Lithuanian Commonwealth and the Kingdom of Sweden between 1592 and 1599. It began when Sigismund III Vasa, elected King of Poland and Grand Duke of Lithuania, was crowned King of Sweden following the death of his father John III. The union ended following a civil war in Sweden in which he lost the crown to his uncle, who eventually became Charles IX. Sigismund afterwards returned to Warsaw and pursued a war against his former realm.

== History ==
=== Prelude ===
After the death of John III, his son Sigismund became heir to the throne of Sweden. Sigismund at that time was already the elected King of Poland, and had so been since 1587. Sigismund certainly valued the Swedish throne and upon learning about the death of his father, and the pretensions to the throne of his uncle, Duke Charles of Södermanland, he asked the Sejm (Polish parliament) for permission to leave the Commonwealth and go to Sweden, where he could secure the Swedish crown. The Sejm gave him permission, and on 3 August 1593, Sigismund, accompanied by his wife, Anna of Habsburg, and other followers, departed for Sweden.

In Sweden, he encountered a serious problem due to his religion, as Sigismund was a devoted Catholic, and most of the Swedish population (including Charles) had converted to Lutheranism. There were fears that Sigismund, if elected king, would support the Catholics against the Protestants. At this period Duke Charles and his Protestant allies were clearly outnumbered by the supporters of Sigismund. Nevertheless, immediately after King John’s death, a synod summoned to Uppsala by Duke Charles rejected the new liturgy and drew up an anti-Catholic confession of faith on 5 March 1593. Holy Scripture and the three primitive creeds were declared to be the true foundations of Christian faith, and the Augsburg confession was adopted, on 9 January 1594, in Uppsala. Sigismund was confronted by the representatives of the Lutherans and the lower nobility. Pressured by the political situation, and amidst the turmoil which included Sigismund's Catholic entourage and their Lutheran opponents, he eventually agreed on February 19, to guarantee religious freedom to the Protestants, and forbade the Catholics from public demonstrations of their faith and from holding high offices.

=== Union ===
The agreement of 19 February seemed to have calmed the situation; Sigismund was crowned in the Cathedral of Uppsala and became the king of Sweden. The Kingdom of Sweden was now in a personal union with Polish–Lithuanian Commonwealth. In July, Sigismund left Sweden in the hands of the regency council and returned to Poland. Sweden was to be ruled jointly by the Privy Council of Sweden and Sigismund's uncle Duke Charles.

Sigismund, however, reneged on his earlier promises, opening Catholic schools, and giving Catholics prominent posts. Charles in turn did not give up on acquiring the Swedish throne and pursued his own political agenda. On 18 May 1595 he signed a treaty of Teusina with Muscovy, ending the Russo-Swedish War (1590–95) by agreeing borders status quo ante bellum around the Gulf of Finland (Ingria) and recalling some of Sigismund's supporters posts (among them, Admiral Klaus Fleming). That went against Sigismund's plans, as he had promised in his pacta conventa during his election to the Commonwealth throne to cede the Duchy of Estonia to the Commonwealth from Sweden, and in turn compensate Sweden with territory acquired from Muscovy. In 1595, Charles openly disobeyed the king by calling the Riksdag of the Estates to session in Söderköping. The Riksdag of 1595, proclaimed him regent though King Sigismund had previously refused him that office. Supported by many Protestants and most of the lower classes, he was opposed by most of the nobility, Catholics, the area constituting modern Finland, and most of the population of Stockholm. Sweden was now on the verge of civil war.

Duke Charles sought to end the conflict by military means, but gained little support within the Privy Council. The new Riksdag he summoned at Arboga in 1597 – again despite the King's orders – saw few participants, and only one from the Privy Council. Even so, Duke Charles did not achieve support for his military action, but initiated it nonetheless. Parts of southern Sweden were successfully taken. Several of the Privy Council members fled to Poland to convince Sigismund to take counteractions. Sigismund sent a diplomatic mission, in an attempt to solve the conflict by negotiations. Charles at first looked ready to negotiate but in fact he was playing for time, trying to confirm his power at another Riksdag (in Arboga), recruiting peasants for his army, and isolating Sigismund's followers.

In 1598, the Sejm gave Sigismund the go-ahead to wage a military campaign against his opponents in Sweden; however it refused to give him significant support. Sigismund's army was composed mostly of mercenaries (Germans and Hungarians), supported by a relatively small Polish force (although with some artillery).

Sigismund's campaign was poorly planned. He was unable to coordinate his troop movements with his supporters, particularly Fleming who was supposed to attack Charles from Finland. After initial successes (the taking of Kalmar and defeating Charles' troops at Stegeborg), Sigismund's forces were defeated on 25 September 1598 at the Battle of Stångebro (also known as the battle of Linköping). Sigismund was captured and forced to hand over some of his followers such as the Chancellor of Sweden, Erik Sparre. In May 1599, Charles' forces captured the last fortress held by Sigismund, Kalmar. On 24 July 1599, the Riksdag in Stockholm officially dethroned Sigismund. The new King of Sweden was Charles IX of Sweden, and the Polish–Swedish union was dissolved after barely seven years of existence. In March 1600, some of Sigismund's supporters were executed, including five senators, in an event known as the Linköping Bloodbath (Swedish: Linköpings blodbad).

=== Aftermath ===
Sigismund, who was allowed to return to Poland, did not relinquish his desire to regain the throne of Sweden. This attitude led to a series of Polish–Swedish wars, that culminated during the reign of his son, John II Casimir of Poland, with the giant Swedish invasion of Poland known as the Deluge.

== Geography ==
At the time of the union, the coastline of Poland stretched from Pomerania in the southwest to Pärnu in the northeast (modern-day Estonia). The Swedish coastline stretched from Brömsebro in the west, around the northern part of the Baltic, down to Pärnu.

== See also ==
- Lithuanian–Swedish union
- Polish–Swedish War
- Polish–Lithuanian–Muscovite Commonwealth
- Russo-Polish War
- Polish–Lithuanian union
- Polish–Lithuanian Wars
