= Battle of Stångebro =

1598 battle in Sweden

- Part of the War against Sigismund
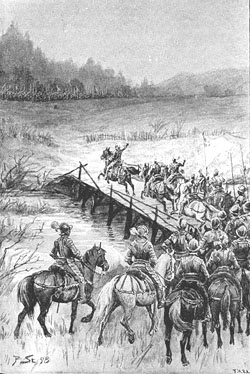
Date	25 September 1598
Location	Linköping, Sweden 58°24′57″N 15°37′31″E
Result	Separatist victory
Territorial changes	Sigismund loses control of Sweden

Belligerents
Polish–Swedish union	Swedish separatists

Commanders and leaders
Sigismund III	Duke Charles

Strength
5,200–8,000 men	9,000–12,000 men

Casualties and losses
500 killed, wounded, or captured	40 killed 200 wounded

The Battle of Stångebro, or the Battle of Linköping, took place at Linköping, Sweden, on 25 September 1598 (O.S.) and effectively ended the personal union between Sweden and the Polish–Lithuanian Commonwealth, that had formed in 1592. In the battle, an army of somewhere between 8,000 and 12,000 commanded by Duke Charles defeated a mixed force of roughly 5,000 and 8,000 men consisting of an invading army of mercenaries in the king's employ and diverse but poorly co-ordinated supporting Swedish noblemen's forces commanded by King of both Sweden and the Polish–Lithuanian Commonwealth, Sigismund III Vasa, who was acting to maintain and restore his personal union against anti-Catholic forces in Lutheran Sweden. The Swedish king's general Constantin fought at the western bridge.

The battle was the beginning of the seven decades long Polish–Swedish Wars, which eventually destroyed the Polish–Lithuanian Commonwealth, at the time, arguably the largest nation state in Europe and also led to fall of Swedish Empire in 1721. Like the Thirty Years' War which also involved Sweden, under the surface, the dynastic struggles were rooted firmly in religious strife between Protestants and Roman Catholics during the ongoing European wars of religion.

== Background ==
When King John III of Sweden died in 1592, his son Sigismund inherited the throne, despite his Catholic upbringing and despite already being King of Poland–Lithuania. However, he was refused coronation unless he agreed to the conditions of a clerical convention in Uppsala, making Sweden decisively Protestant. The debate was resolved in 1594, and freedom of religion was proclaimed, although only Protestants could hold high offices. The Swedish nobility also sought greater freedom and privileges. They were not granted these, but in the absence of the king, who spent most of his time in Poland, Sweden was to be ruled jointly by the Privy Council and Sigismund's uncle, Duke Charles. At the Riksdag in Söderköping, summoned against the will of the king, Duke Charles was elected regent in the king's absence. This was protested by Sigismund and those nobles loyal to him (mostly found in Finland after the king's governor, Klaus Fleming, had put down a peasant uprising there).

Duke Charles sought to end the conflict by military means, but gained little support within the Privy Council. The new Riksens ständer he summoned at Arboga in 1597 – again despite the king's orders – saw few participants, and only one from the Privy Council. Even so, he did not receive support for military action, but initiated it nonetheless. Parts of southern Sweden were taken. Several of the Privy Council members fled to Poland to convince Sigismund to take counteraction.

During the summer of 1598, Sigismund's fleet took back Kalmar and continued northward. The force won a battle against the troops of Duke Charles at Stegeborg but soon found itself encircled and retired to Linköping. The support Sigismund had counted on from the Swedish people did materialize to some extent, splitting the Swedish armed forces into two hostile fractions.

== Battle ==
At the time of the battle there were two bridges over the river Stångån, Stora Stångebro and Lilla Stångebro. Today this is a central part of Linköping, but in the 16th century the city did not extend east of the river. When the forces of Duke Charles approached from the east on the morning of 25 September, Sigismund's army charged out of the city and met them at these bridges. A thick fog was instrumental at hiding the troop movements from their respective enemies. Both armies included small sections of cavalry.

The duke was the first to attack. He won a quick victory at Stora Stångebro and moved his troops over to Lilla Stångebro, where Sigismund's forces had reached the eastern shore and defended a good position. The duke's forces retired up a hill, where severe fighting followed. Sigismund's cavalry did not engage in this fight, which led to a certain victory for Duke Charles.

At this point, Sigismund asked for a truce, which was accepted. According to propaganda from Duke Charles, his losses were light, only about forty dead and slightly more than 200 wounded while King Sigismund lost 2,000 soldiers, many of them drowned in the river while they retreated.

== Aftermath ==
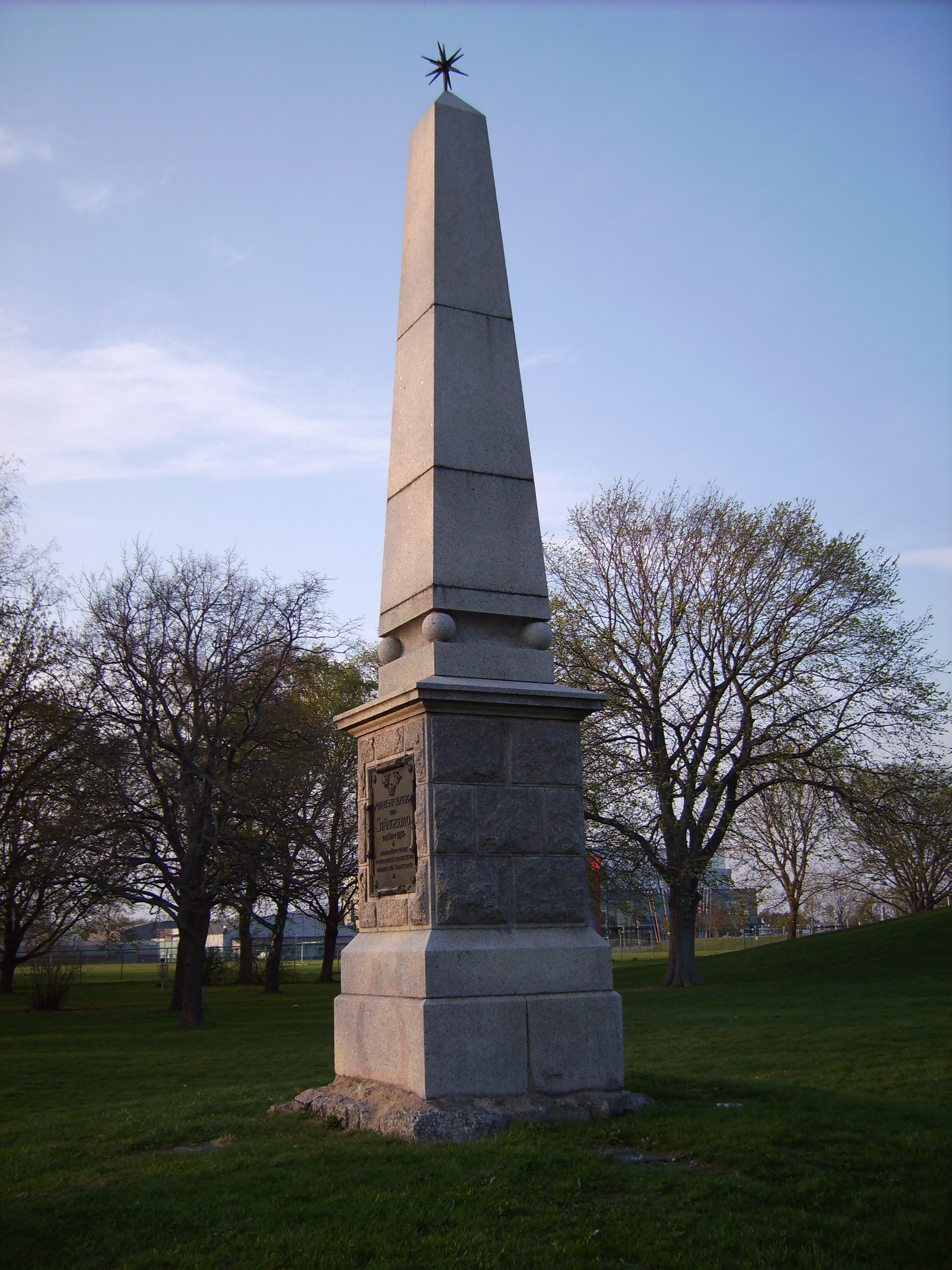
The Stångebro monument in Linköping

In negotiations after the battle, Charles demanded that Sigismund send home his troops and surrender the Privy Council members loyal to him, and that the king himself stay to attend the Riksens ständer. Sigismund chose to leave the country instead, sailing back to Poland, but surrendering the Privy Council members in question.

Soon, only Kalmar was held by the king's people. When it fell on 12 May 1599, Duke Charles had control over the entire country. When he asked the Riksens ständer at Linköping in 1600 for support as regent, it answered by proclaiming him king. He did not begin to use the title himself however, under the name Charles IX, until 1603. This Riksens ständer also appointed a court to judge those aristocrats who had fought with Sigismund in the battle. Eight were sentenced to death; five of the executions were carried out, including Erik Sparre, then-Lord High Chancellor of Sweden. This event, at the main square of Linköping on 20 March 1600, is known as the Linköping Bloodbath.

With Sigismund's loss of the Swedish crown, the Polish–Swedish union was dissolved. A deep conflict between Sweden and Poland emerged; the nations would clash many times during the Polish–Swedish War, not to be resolved until the Great Northern War. Also, most remaining Catholic elements of Swedish society were wiped out, and Sweden became one of the foremost advocates of Protestantism, not least important during the Thirty Years' War.

A 9-metre (29.5 ft) monument was erected in 1898 at the battleground, immediately east of the river and close to the Stångebro sports field.

== See also ==
- Stångebro
- Linköping Bloodbath
- Club War, civil war between Charles and Sigismund supporters in Österland (Finland of 1596–1597)

== Works cited ==
- Wolke, Lars Ericson (2003). Svenska slagfält [Swedish battlefields] (in Swedish). Wahlström & Widstrand. ISBN 9789146202257.
- Sundberg, Ulf (2010). Sveriges krig 1448-1630 [Sweden's wars 1448-1630] (in Swedish). Svenskt militärhistoriskt bibliotek. ISBN 9789185789627.
