= Michael Roberts (historian) =

English historian (1908–1996)

Michael Roberts (1908–1996) was an English historian specialising in the early modern period. He was particularly known for his studies of Swedish history, and his introduction of the concept of a Military Revolution in early modern Europe.

== Biography ==
Roberts was born in Lytham St Annes, Lancashire and educated at Brighton College, and Worcester College, Oxford. He taught at Rhodes University College in Grahamstown, South Africa from 1935, served in the army in East Africa during World War II, and headed the British Council in Stockholm 1944–46. From 1954 until his retirement in 1973, he was professor of modern history at the Queen's University of Belfast. He also held guest professorships in U.S. universities. He was a member of the British Academy and the Royal Irish Academy.

Roberts is chiefly known as the originator of the theory of a "Revolution in Military Affairs" or RMA, which he first presented in a paper entitled "The Military Revolution: 1560-1660" in a lecture at the Queen's university of Belfast in 1955. This theory holds that certain changes in military tactics and technology led to a revolutionary new method of waging war that made combat more decisive.

Although originally working in the area of British history, Roberts soon gained an interest in the history of Sweden and learnt Swedish prior to 1940. He made his most significant contributions on the period from the late 16th to the early 18th century when Sweden was a major player on the European political and military scene, but published several studies on later periods in both Swedish and British history. Some of his works on Swedish history are used as textbooks in Swedish universities and several have also been translated into Swedish. In addition, he proposed the concept of a 'military revolution' in the early modern Europe - an idea that, with modification, is still used by historians.

Roberts also wrote translated the poet Birger Sjöberg and Sweden's bard Carl Michael Bellman into English, which he published himself. These works are on file at the National Library of Sweden. In 2008 the Birger Sjöberg Society published Frida's New Clothes, a collection of the poet's lyrics in translation. Fourteen of the translations were by Roberts.

Michael Roberts had several Swedish honours bestowed upon him; among other things he received an honorary doctorate from Stockholm University, and was elected a member of the Royal Swedish Academy of Letters, History and Antiquities.

== Reception ==
Jeremy Black, writing in History Today, comments that "Few subjects are identified so closely with one man as English-language scholarship on early-modern Sweden and Michael Roberts."

Glansholms Bokhandel & Antikvariat (in Sweden) comment that Roberts gives a fascinating picture of Sweden in the Age of Liberty in his book, and that "he is a good storyteller in his Anglo-Saxon tradition, succeeding in telling Swedish history with clarity and humour."

== Select bibliography ==
- The Whig Party, 1807–1812 (1939).
- Gustav Adolf the Great (translator) (1940).
- Gustavus Adolphus, A History of Sweden 1611–1632 (two volumes, 1953–1958).
- Sweden as a Great Power 1611–1697 (1968).
- The Early Vasas: A History of Sweden 1523–1611 (1968).
- Gustavus Adolphus and the Rise of Sweden (1973).
- Sweden's Age of Greatness, 1632-1718 (editor) (1973).
- Twelve Pieces and an Introduction from Fridas bok (translator) (1975).
- Epistles and Songs: Carl Michael Bellman (translator) (three volumes, 1977–1981).
- The Swedish Imperial Experience, 1560–1718 (1979).
- British Diplomacy and Swedish Politics, 1758–1773 (1980).
- The Age of Liberty: Sweden 1719–1772 (1986).
- Essays in Swedish History (1967).
- Swedish Diplomats at Cromwell's Court 1655-56: The Missions of Peter Julius Coyet and Christer Bonde (editor) (1988).
- From Oxenstierna to Charles XII: Four Studies (1991).
