= Klaus Fleming =

Member of Swedish nobility

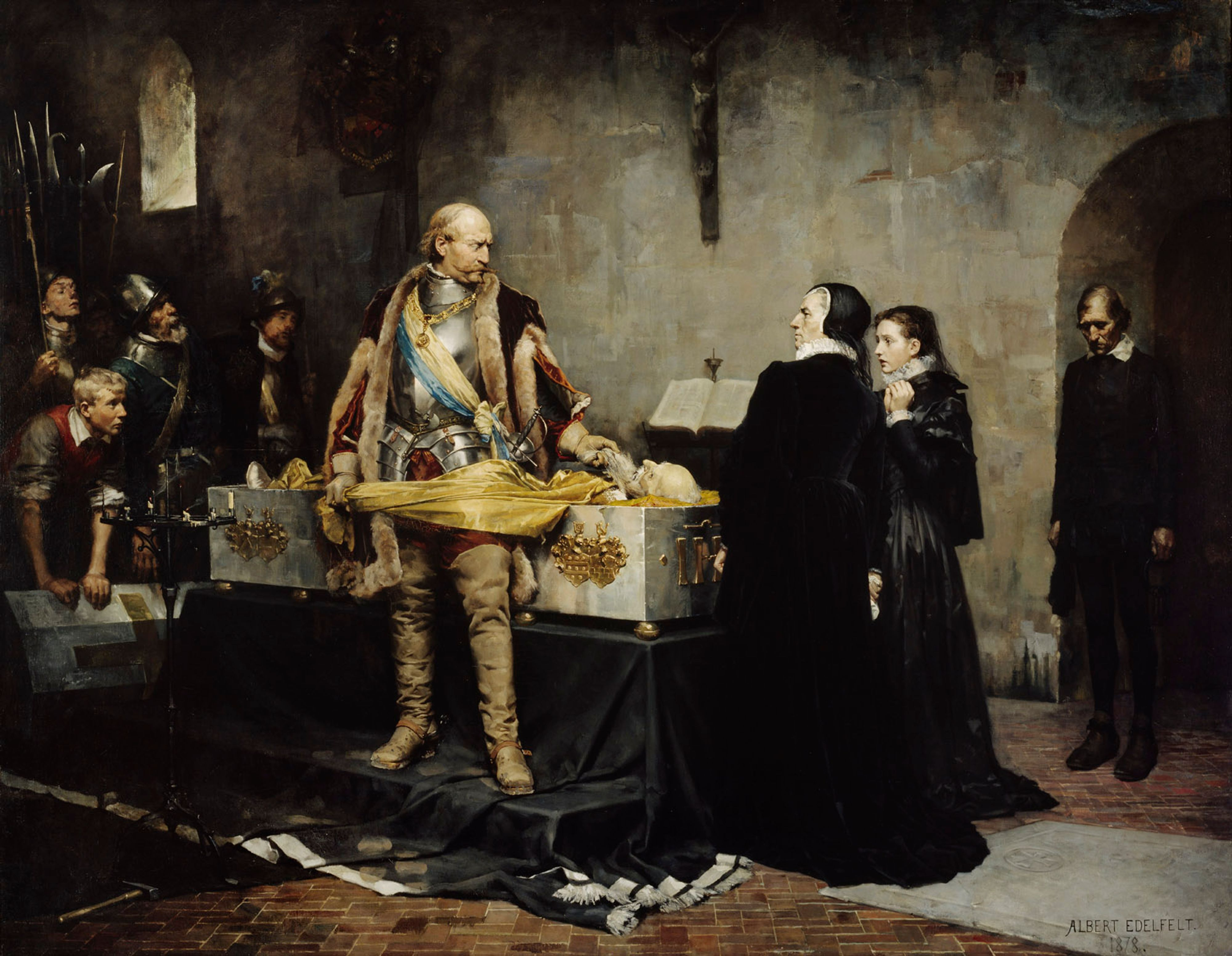
- Duke Karl Insulting the Corpse of Klaus Fleming, Albert Edelfelt, 1878. Fleming's wife Ebba Stenbock on the right.

1st Lord High Admiral of Sweden
- In office 1571? 1588? – 1591?
- Succeeded by: Axel Nilsson Ryning

Lord High Constable of Sweden
- In office 1591?–?
- Preceded by: Gustaf Olofsson Stenbock
- Succeeded by: Magnus Brahe

Personal details
- Born: Clas Eriksson Fleming; 1535 Pargas, Sweden (now in Finland)
- Died: 13 April 1597 (aged 61–62) Pojo, Sweden (now part of Raseborg in Finland)
- Spouse: Ebba Stenbock
- Children: Johan Fleming

Baron Klaus Eriksson Fleming (Swedish: Clas Eriksson Fleming; 1535 in Pargas – 13 April 1597 in Pohja) was a Finnish-born member of the Swedish nobility and admiral, who played an important role in Finnish and Swedish history during the rise of Sweden as a Great Power. He was a trustee of kings John III and Sigismund Vasa. His wife was Ebba Stenbock.

== Biography ==
Fleming's father – a grandson of Björn Ragvaldsson – was the Councilor of State Erik Fleming (1487–1548), also a remarkable man and King Gustav Vasa's favourite.

In February 1564, during the Northern Seven Years' War, Fleming participated in the unsuccessful siege of Bohus fortress.

In 1569 Fleming became a member of the Privy Council, in 1571 he was made Lord High Admiral and in 1590 Lord High Constable. As the Governor of Finland and Estonia, he carried the duties of the highest authority of Finland and Estonia for the Swedish realm, next only to the king. He was a strong supporter of the legitimate king of Sweden and Poland, Sigismund Vasa, and therefore an enemy of Sigismund's paternal uncle, duke Charles of Sudermania, who had also laid claim to the Swedish throne. He subdued rebels of the Cudgel War in 1596–97. A civil war against Charles was, however, on the horizon.

His sister Filippa Fleming (d. 1578) wrote a will which disinherited him for his abandonment of her during a long illness, bequeathing Yläne manor to John III of Sweden, her estates in Sweden proper to her niece Anna Fleming, and her remaining estates to her betrothed, Knut Jönsson Kurck. This was unusual legal practice for the time.

While his fleet was being prepared at Siuntio in April 1597, he suddenly fell sick. Nevertheless choosing to travel to meet his wife at Perniö, he died somewhere near the church of Pohja during the night of 12–13 April. His body was taken to Turku, which Charles IX conquered that August. Fleming's sons were executed in the Åbo Bloodbath of 1599.

== See also ==
- Fleming of Louhisaari
- Club War
- War against Sigismund
