= Nils Brahe the younger =

Nils Brahe the Younger
- Hans höggrevliga Excellens
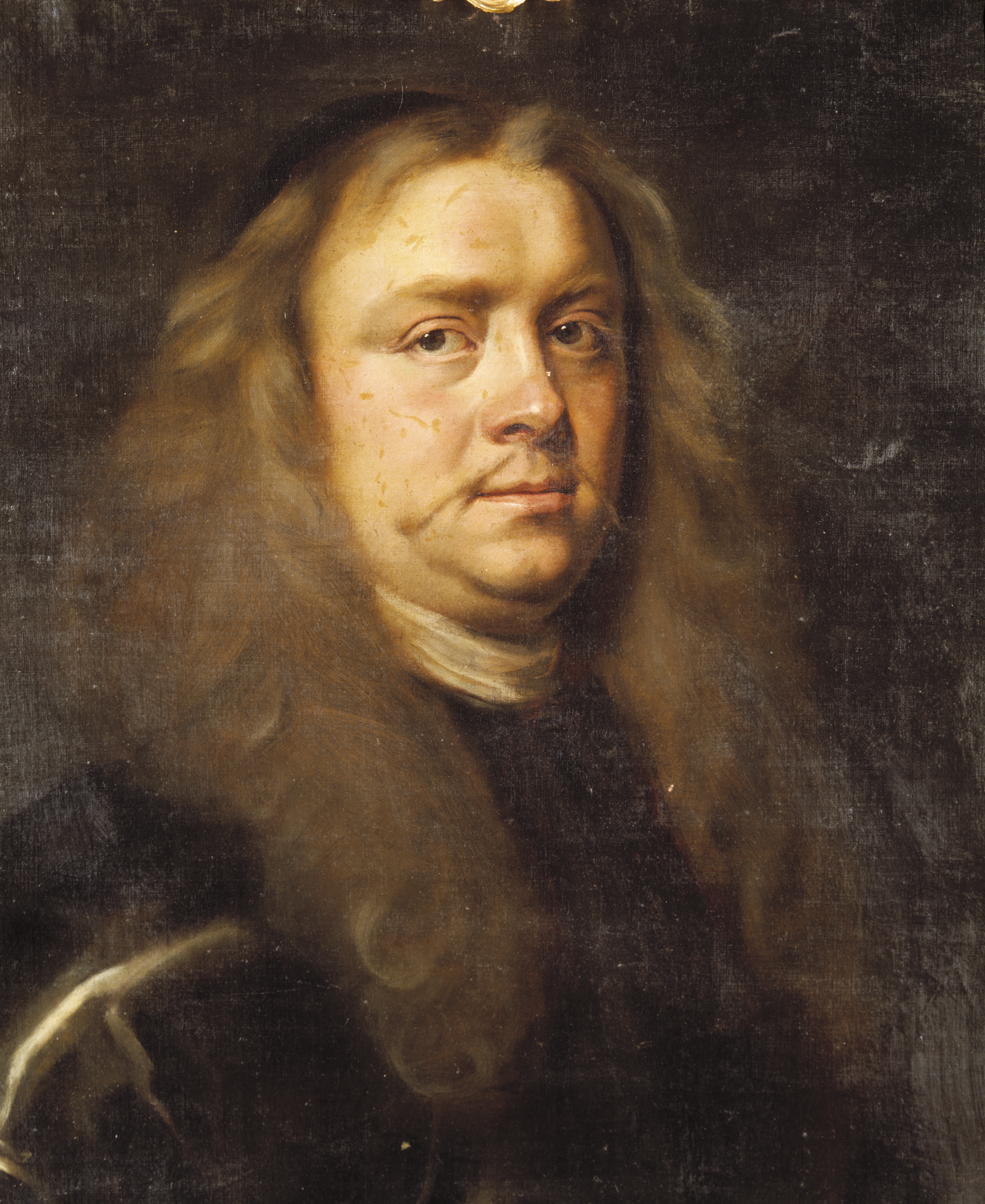

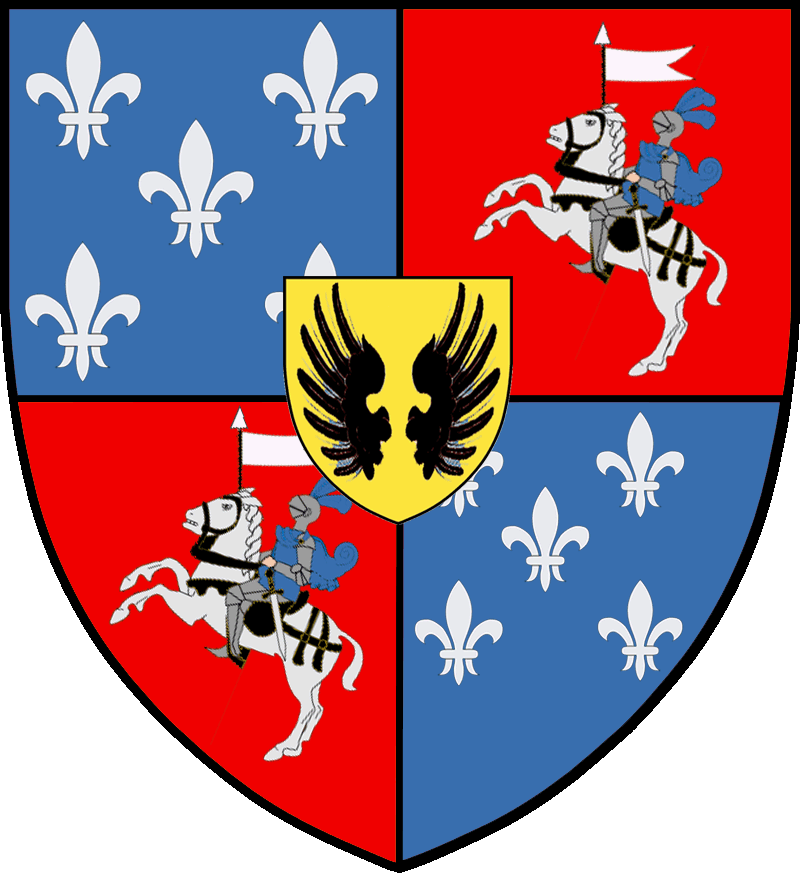
- Coat of arms
- Full name: Nils Nilsson Brahe
- Styles: Count of Visingsborg, Baron of Kajaani, Lord of Rydboholm, Lindholmen, Bogesund and Skokloster in Uppland, Brahehus, Lyckas, Östanå and Västanå in Småland, Sesswegen in Livonia and Spiker on Rügen
- Other titles: Member of the Regency 1660-1672, Lord Chamberlain, Councilor of the Realm, Judge of Jämtland and Härjedalen, MPhil
- Born: 10 April 1633; Anklam, Pomerania
- Died: 25 January 1699 (aged 65); Stockholm
- Buried: Östra Ryd Church, Uppland
- Noble family: Brahe
- Spouse: Margareta Juliana Wrangel af Salmis
- Issue: Abraham Nilsson Brahe
- Father: Nils Brahe the Older
- Mother: Anna Margareta Bielke
- Occupation: Statesman and soldier
- Military career
- Rank: Admiral, Admiralty Commissioner, Lieutenant General, Colonel of the Life Guards, Colonel of Uppland Regiment
- Battles: Siege of Itzehoe 1657, Siege of Fredriksodde 1657, Assault on Copenhagen 1659

Nils Brahe the younger, born 10 April 1633 in Anklam in Pomerania, died 25 January 1699 in Stockholm, was a Swedish count, statesman and soldier.

Brahe was a member of the Regency Council during the minority of Charles XI, but never one of its real leaders. As an admiral and member of the Board of Admiralty he and the other senior members lack of naval experience was an impediment to good management of the navy, although lack of funds and late disbursements from the Treasury contributed to the poor combat capability that haunted the Swedish navy at this time. As a member of the Council of the Realm, he supported Sweden's participation in the Triple Alliance against France, but later found, like a large majority of the council, that stronger reasons spoke in favor of friendly cooperation with Louis XIV. Through the Great Reduction he lost both his county and his barony as well as many of his manors. He also had to take financial responsibility not only for his own actions as member of the regency and the council, but also for those of his uncle and his father-in-law.

== Early life ==
The younger Nils Brahe was born almost six months after his father death from wounds received at the battle of Lützen 1632. After studies in Uppsala, followed by an extensive Grand Tour, he returned home to be appointed colonel of his father's old regiment, the Uppland Foot, in 1657. He then participated with honor in the Swedish campaigns in Poland and Denmark 1657-1658 and 1658-1660, personally leading his regiment out of the trenches at the assaults on Itzehoe and Frederiksodde.

== Member of the Regency ==
Brahe was present at the Diet in Gothenburg in 1660 and as Lord Chamberlain belonged to King Karl Gustav's closest entourage during his last illness. He was thus one of the gentlemen who were present at the reading of the King's will and together with Gabriel Oxenstierna he assisted him in his last moments. Among the ten new councillors of the realm that the King had named in his will that same day, Brahe was one and by virtue of his being a count ranked as the foremost. The Council disregarded the King's testament, and neither the composition of the Council nor of the Regency was exactly as stipulated. At the Diet in Stockholm in the fall of 1660, where the question of the membership of the Regency was decided, Brahe does not appear much, which to some extent is explained by the fact that he was one of the youngest members of the council. Although he was one of the four councillors, who were sent to the House of Nobility to defend the council's handling of the vacant high offices of the state, when it elected Lars Kagg as lord high constable and recognized Magnus Gabriel De la Gardie and Herman Fleming as lord high chancellor and lord high treasurer respectively, by virtue of the late King's power of attorney. Yet, he was also one of the four who two days later made the nobility understand his and his fellow councillors willingness to sacrifice Fleming, and this position must have corresponded better to his real way of thinking.

As a member of the Regency during the minority of Charles XI, which according to the Instrument of Government Act of 1634 had a certain share in the government itself, Brahe was never one of the real leaders, but he spoke often and on various subjects, and he combined a respected character with a brilliant social position. The heir-at-law to Per Brahe, he was after his marriage also son-in-law to Carl Gustaf Wrangel, and later heir to his estate through his wife.

== Member of the Board of Admiralty ==
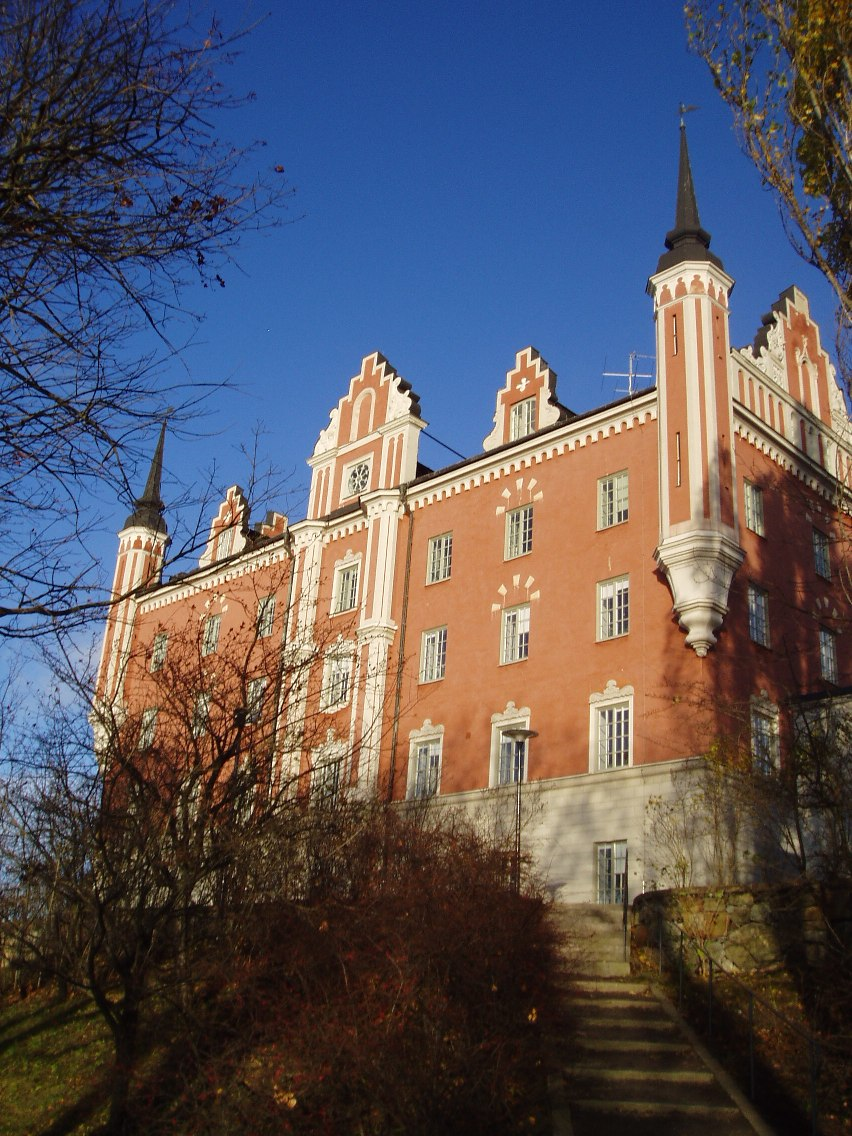
The old admiralty office on Skeppsholmen in Stockholm.

Brahe had no personal or family connections with the navy, and perhaps it was the fact that his father-in-law was lord high admiral that had caused him to be assigned to the Admiralty Board in December 1660 when the new councillors were distributed among the high offices of state. The sometimes-heard information about his appointment as deputy lord high admiral is false, according to the historian George Wittrock. The most important person in the Board during the lord high admirals long absence in Pomerania, which lasted until the autumn of 1663, was initially not Brahe but Klas Hansson Bjelkenstjerna, an experienced admiral who had spent his whole life in the navy, but died in 1662. When his father-in-law became lord high constable at the Diet of 1664, Gustaf Otto Stenbock succeeded him as lord high admiral. As Riksamiralitetsråd (councillors of the realm as well as admiralty commissioners), Brahe and Claes Stiernsköld were the senior admirals and senior members of the Admiralty Board after the lord high admiral. Neither of them hade any previous naval experience, and that was probably not conducive to good order in the naval administration and to the maintenance of the combat capability of the Swedish navy. A number of new and large ships were built during the regency period, but the equipment and maintenance of the fleet as well as the training of the sailors left much to be desired. It was often disputed in the council during the later years of the regency whether the blame for the shortcomings rightly rested with the treasury or the admiralty; whether it was due to late and insufficient appropriations or to poor management of scarce funds.

At a meeting of the Admiralty Board in 1674, Brahe lamented the great loss that the Admiralty suffered annually due to the lack of ready money. Goods must be negotiated on credit and thereby became twice as expensive than if they were paid in cash. Since wages could not be paid in money, sea officers instead took provisions in settlement of their outstanding wages. Yet the provisions were bought expensively on credit and the Admiralty suffered great losses. Due to a lack of funds, the Admiralty could not procure a commodity when it was cheap, "such as hemp, which in the spring, if one had had money then, could be obtained in Riga for fifteen dollars, but in the fall must be paid for at nineteen dollars."

During the Scanian War, Brahe on his flagship Svärdet commanded the Second Squadron in 1675. The fleet, that was under the overall command of Stenbock, as lord high admiral, was to rescue Pomerania and Wismar. The effect of past years' neglect became evident, however. Far from being able to make Sweden master of the Baltic Sea, the fleet had to return to Dalarö after a few days sailing due to shortages, illnesses and a gale. A court martial against Stenbock followed, but Brahe was also blamed. Neither admiral was used in the 1676 naval campaign, and when Brahe, according to his own account, was considered for command of the fleet in 1677, he himself did everything to avoid the dangerous task and resigned from the Navy and the Admiralty Board.

== Member of the Council ==
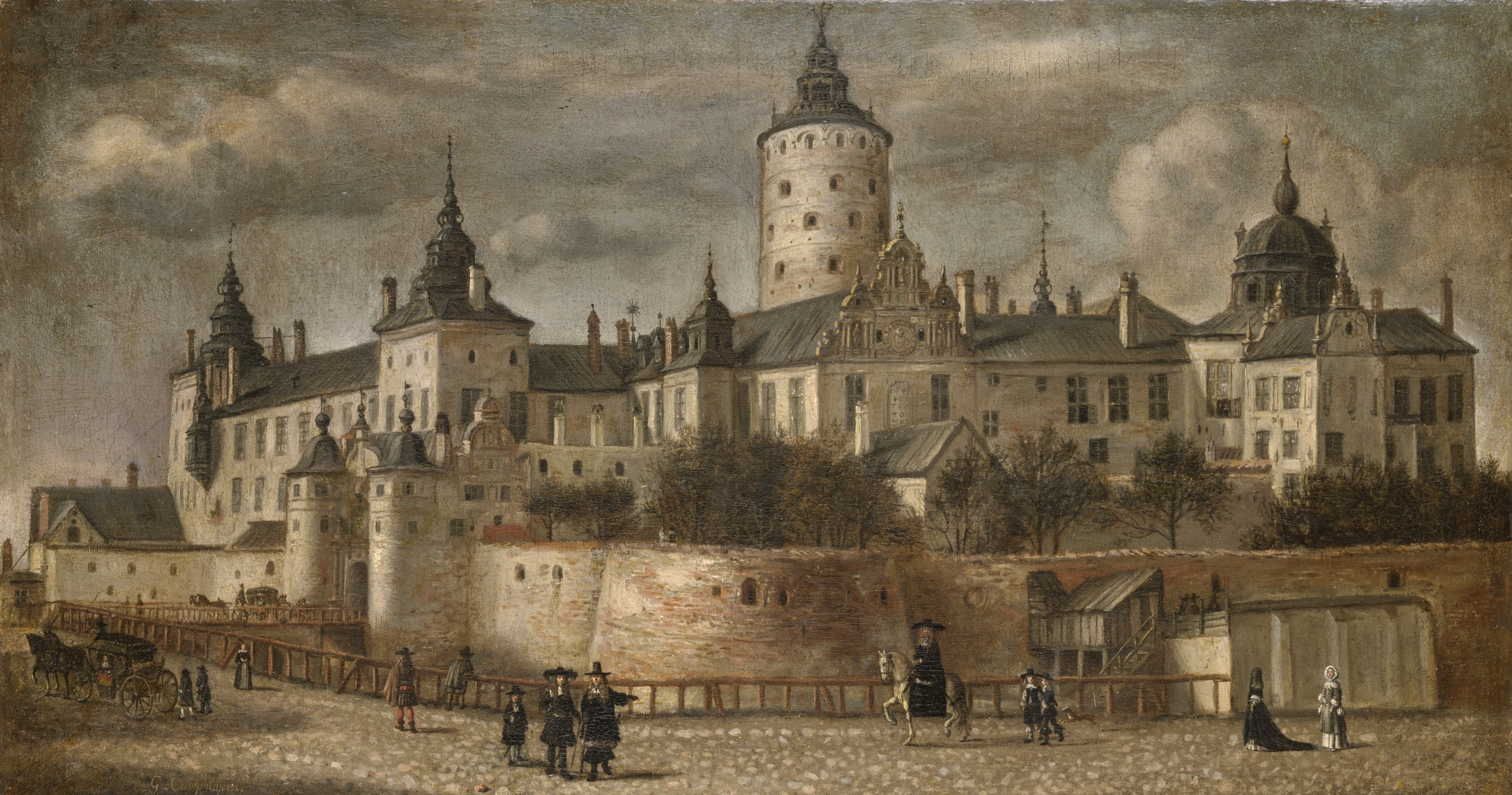
Stockholm old castle where the Council of the Realm met.

Two factions emerged in the Council of the Realm after the death of King; one that advocated an aggressive military policy in alliance with France and one that favoured a prudent foreign policy combined with financial retrenchments as not to arouse the enmity of the common people. De la Gardie championed the former, while the Treasurer, Gustaf Bonde promoted the latter. Brahe's dissatisfaction with the appropriations to the Navy made him inclined to support the Lord Chancellor, Magnus De la Gardie, when he in the mid-sixties and especially during Bonde's illness, increasingly sought to usurp the management of the national finances. After the Chancellor's attack on the Board of Treasury in 1666, he enthusiastically agreed with De la Gardie's demand for vigorous action. During a major debate in the Council in 1667 whether Sweden should bind itself to unbreakable neutrality during the King's minority, Brahe argued that the main reason for inaction would be the desire to avoid dangers. Yet a risk also lay in the fact that Denmark in the meantime could grow in power with the help of French money and at the same time other enemies so increased in strength that Sweden would find it difficult to defend itself. Better, therefore argued Brahe, to prevent the emergence of others to the detriment of Sweden through connections that nevertheless did not have to lead to open war. This is the same idea that underlies the 1672 alliance with Louis XIV against the Dutch Republic, also approved by Brahe. He supported Sweden's accession to France's enemies in the Triple Alliance (1668) of 1668. Yet, like the large majority of the council, he found during the negotiations with Pomponne and the French Ambassador in 1671−72, that compelling reasons now spoke in favor of amiable collaboration with King Louis; Spain's inertia, the Emperor's wavering stance, England's transition to the French side and fears about Denmark's plans made the future uncertain.

When Brahe supported the Triple Alliance, he deviated from Magnus De la Gardie's policy, which was loyalty to France in all respects, and at the same time their paths also parted in domestic politics. When in 1668 Per Brahe arranged for the appointment of a commission on the administration of the government, it was his nephew Nils who was entered among the commissioners as a representative of the Admiralty Board. The commissions report, the Blue Book, was a sharp assessment of the national finances of De la Gardie's making. De la Gardie, however, managed to reestablished his position and the state budget for 1669 was his work. Yet, at the end of November Per Brahe retained the upper hand and pushed through fairly extensive cuts in state expenditures. In all this he had the support of his nephew Nils. On a few occasions Brahe is found as an opponent of the cautious policy, but his name was not absent from the council in which the victorious majority bound themselves to uphold their decisions until the King came of age. Brahe had all the less reason to return to De la Gardie's side, as the latter openly expressed his doubts as to whether the Admiralty could rightly absolve itself of blame for the difficulties in the navy. Brahe thus again become a member of the Commission of 1671, whose task was similar to the previous one; he stated that those attacked by De la Gardie had all reason to defend themselves.

The weak national leadership during the following years, under the predominant influence of De la Gardie, brought Sweden into war and defeat. Brahe was one of the commissioners who negotiated with the French envoy about the transfer of Swedish troops to Germany to put pressure on Brandenburg and Lüneburg, and with the others of the Council he signed the Swedish governments commitment in September 1674. It now became of particular importance to at least hold Denmark back from breaking the peace; for this purpose he was sent at the end of the year to Copenhagen, where he arrived when Griffenfeld was still handling foreign affairs. Later he was commissioned to propose, independently of a treaty, a marriage between the young Charles XI and Christian V's sister, the Danish princess Ulrika Eleonora. The betrothal was announced, but with the disputed alliance, it had been dragged out on the Danish side, and the Swedish defeat at Fehrbellin in 1675 brought the matter to nothing. Denmark declared war, and only after its end could the royal marriage be consummated.

== The Great Reduction ==
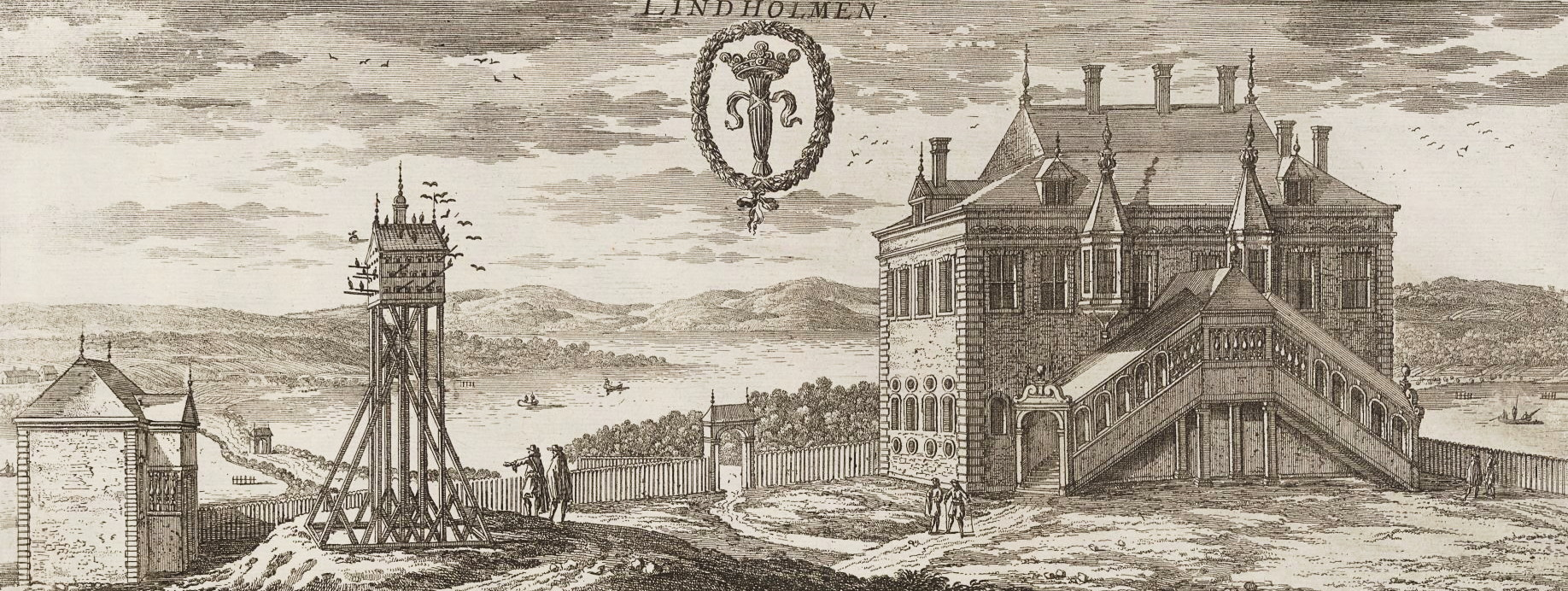
In spite of the Great Reduction, Lindholmen manor remained in the Brahe family ownership until 1708.

After the introduction of royal absolutism Brahe continued to participate in the work of the council until he was dismissed in April 1682, along with seven of his fellow councilors who had remained from the regency period. He was hit hard by both the Great Reduction and the Regency Inquest. Through the former he lost a number of donated manors, as well as Visingsborg and Kajaani which he had inherited from his uncle Per Brahe. Through the latter he had to take responsibility not only for his own actions, but also those of his uncle's and his father-in-law's. He submitted unwillingly and only under protest to the inquest commission; he believed himself responsible for the council he had given only to God, unless he had been guilty of treason, taken bribes or acted with evil intent. If he again undertook to defend his ancestors, he would not be worthy of being their heir; it must first be proven that they needed a defence. But resistance was futile, and Brahe finally found it wisest to enter into a settlement with the Crown, whereby he undertook to pay for himself and his uncle together a sum of 431,000 Rixdollars and for Carl Gustav Wrangel 256,000. Among other items, he had to pay restitution to the Crown for 45,788 days of sailor work which he had used for his own private purposes. Brahe was perhaps one of those hit hardest by the reduction. Despite this, he managed to retain some of the country's most renowned castles, such as Bogesund, Rydboholm and Skokloster.
