= Brahehus =

Building in Jönköping Municipality, Jönköping County, Sweden

Coordinates: 58°03′10″N 14°30′17″E

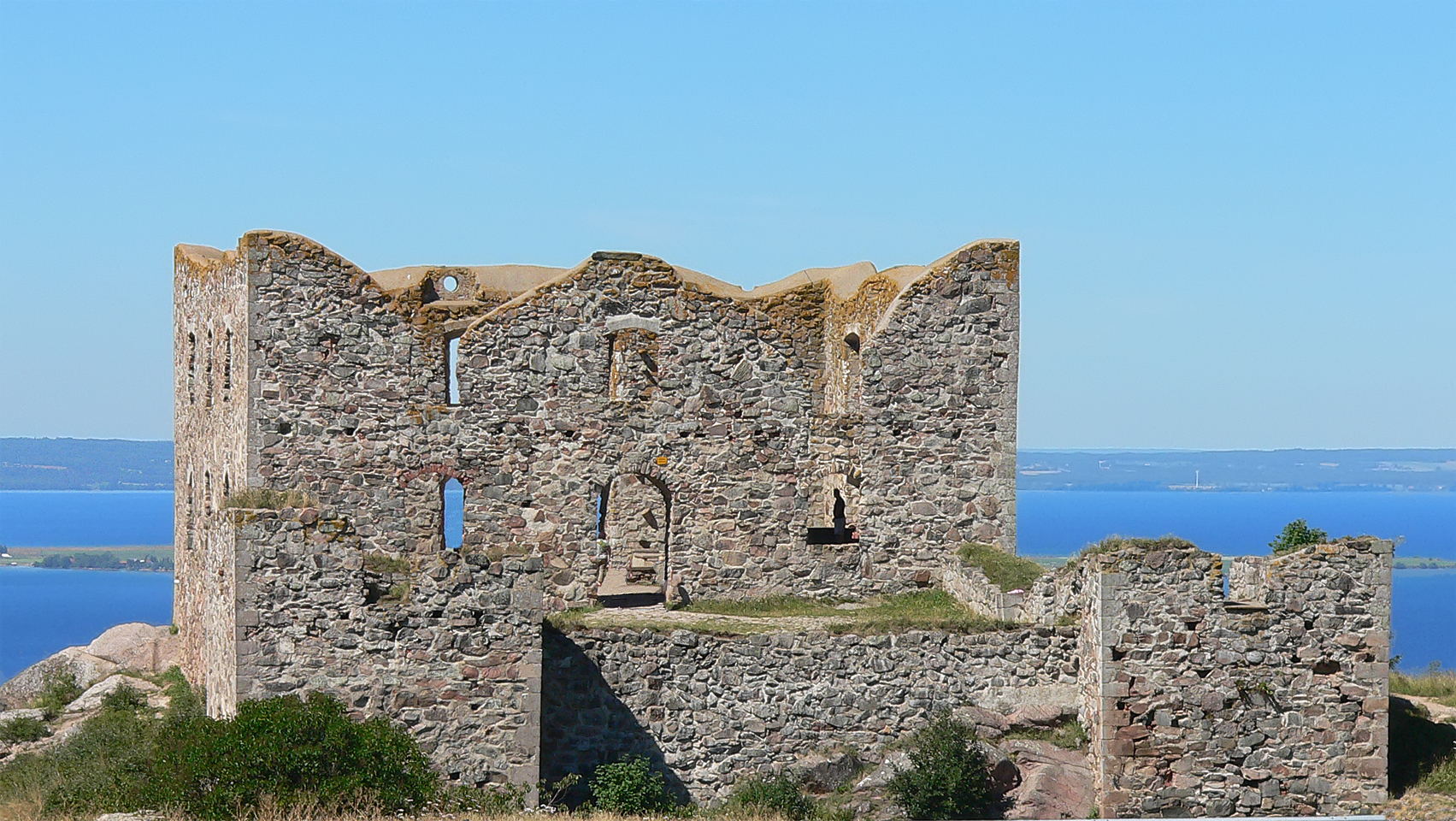
Brahehus with Vättern lake at rear

The ruins of Brahehus Castle are located 3 km (2 mi) outside of Gränna in Jönköping County in the province of Småland, Sweden. The ruins sit 270 m (890 ft) above sea level and 180 m (590 ft) above the lake Vättern, providing a panoramic view of the lake and the island of Visingsö. Built for and named after Count Per Brahe the Younger in the 1640s, the castle was abandoned by the 1680s and suffered a fire in 1708. The castle is near the modern E4 highway and is a popular destination for recreation and tourism.

== History ==
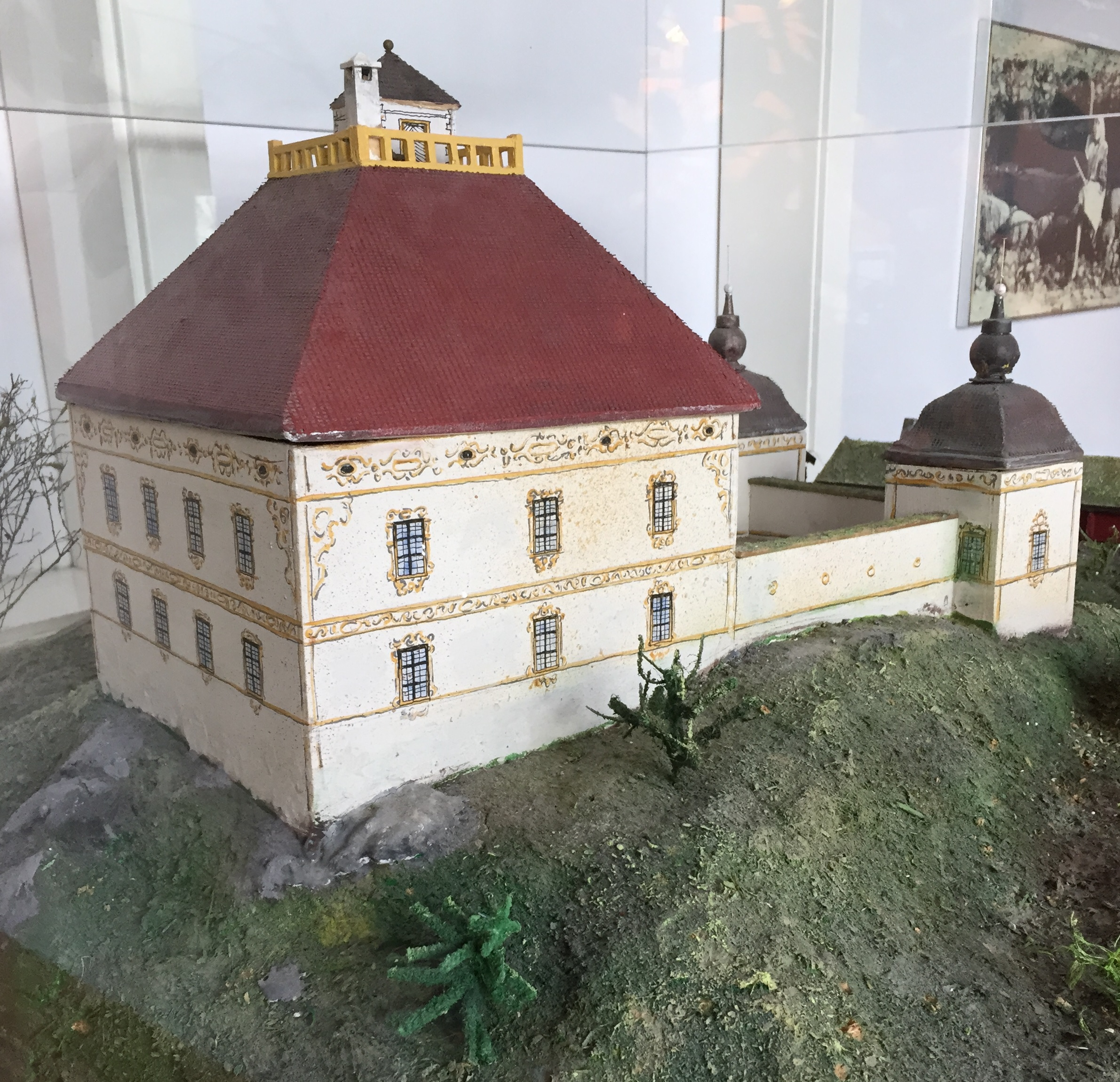
Model of Brahehus c. 1670

The rock Brahehus stands on was originally known as "Gudsbacka" or "Grusbacka" and was before the construction of the castle occupied by a small hut. In the 16th century, the area found itself in the county (Note: Swedish grevskap, compare German Grafschaft. Not to be confused with Swedish län, a modern administrative unit commonly translated as "county" in English.) of Visingsborg, which was under the control of the Brahe family. The plans for a castle on Gudsbacka, chosen for its views of the county, were first conceived by Count Per Brahe the Younger in the 1630s, who intended it as a dower house for his wife, Countess Kristina Katarina Stenbock. Construction began in 1638, but proceeded slowly due to other construction projects. Construction of the castle was further hindered by its location, which required large amounts of stone to be hauled uphill.

The location of Brahehus harmonised visually with Brahe's other two castles – Västanå Manor south of Gränna and Visingsborg Castle on Visingsö; the three of them were intended to form an equilateral triangle surrounding Gränna. The castle's architecture was inspired by Renaissance castles in the Mälaren Valley, which syncretised native elements with the Palladian style, while the location on a hilltop emulated castles in the Rhine Valley. Brahehus consisted of a square main building with a side of 22 m (72 ft), and two spired side towers, one to the north and one to the south, each connected to the main building by a side wall. Twelve guards were stationed in the northern tower, which also included weapons storage and possibly a prison cell in the cellar; the southern tower, on the other hand, housed a well and likely also a kitchen. The main building was divided into two storeys and a cellar, with a kitchen on the lower floor, and halls and bedrooms – one for the Count and Countess, and two for guests – on the upper floor. Roof lanterns, surrounded by a balcony, were placed on the roof. The castle was decorated by Brahe's court painter Johan Johansson Werner. Pillars and foliage were painted on the exteriors, and interiors featured brightly-coloured themes from the mythology of the Roman poet Ovid, as well as a painting of the Battle of Lützen, portraits of Brahe's ancestors on the upper floor, and a panorama of the county with Brahe himself on horseback.

Brahehus was finished in 1651. In the following year, Brahe founded Gränna and had its streets oriented towards the castle, so that the streets would be clearly visible from the castle and vice versa. Its original purpose as a dower house for the Countess had been rendered moot by her death in 1650, so the castle instead housed entertainment for Brahe's guests. Per Brahe the Younger died in 1680, and his successor Count Nils Brahe the Younger was considerably less interested in the castle's fate. Soon thereafter, (Note: Either later in 1680 or in 1685.) Brahehus was confiscated to the crown in the Great Reduction of Charles XI, and much of the movables were auctioned in Jönköping 1697–1702. On 29 September 1708, a fire broke out in the nearby village of Uppgränna, which quickly spread to and consumed Brahehus.

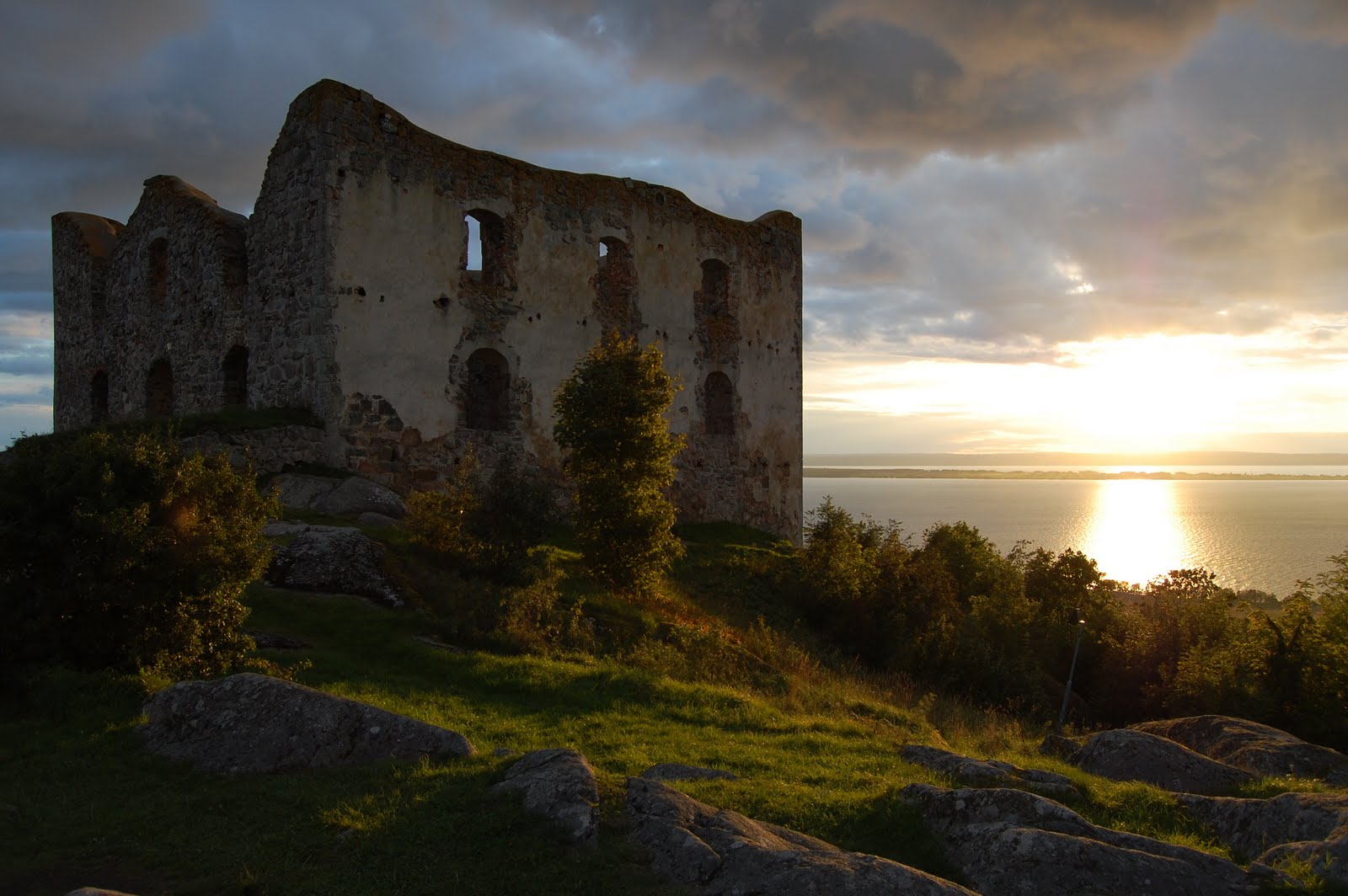
Brahehus at sunset, September 2010

Interest in the castle ruins grew in the 19th century, when it was perceived as a romantic destination. The first plans for a restoration of the ruins were drawn up by the Royal Academy of Letters in 1891, although the actual restoration was performed later between 1911 and 1913. Since then, Brahehus has been restored four more times, the latest in 2011–2012. In 1972, the E4 motorway, with a service area (including, despite objections from the National Heritage Board and the local antiquarian, a petrol station), was opened 50 m (160 ft) from the ruins.

== Gallery ==
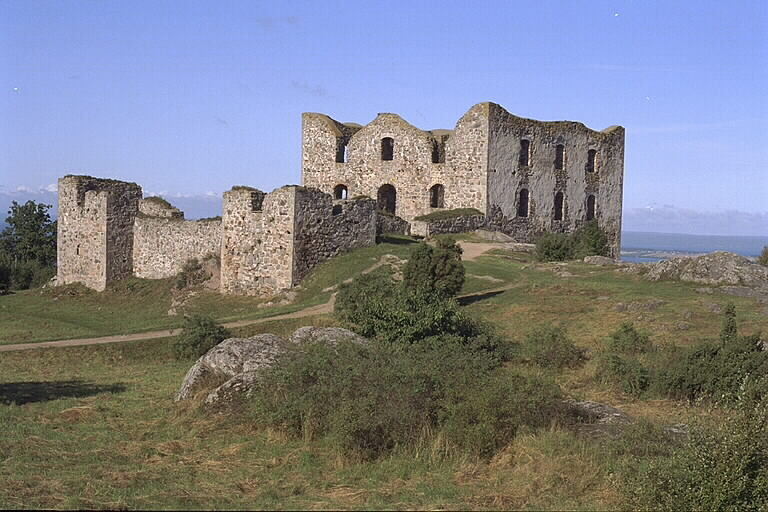

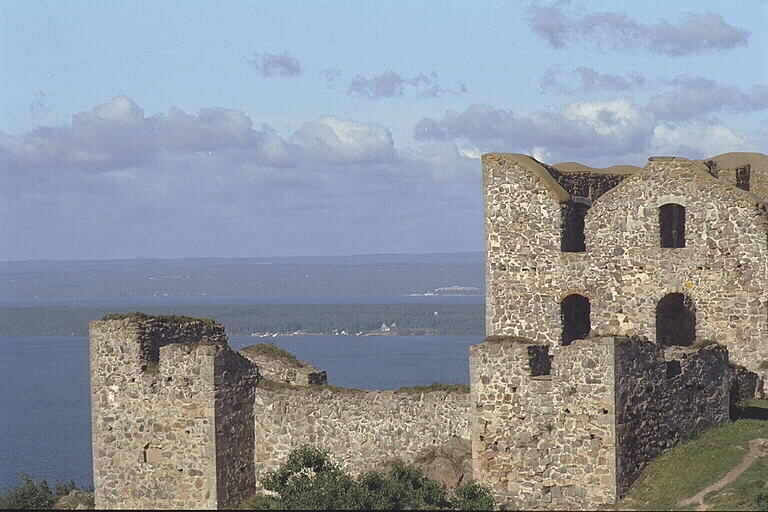

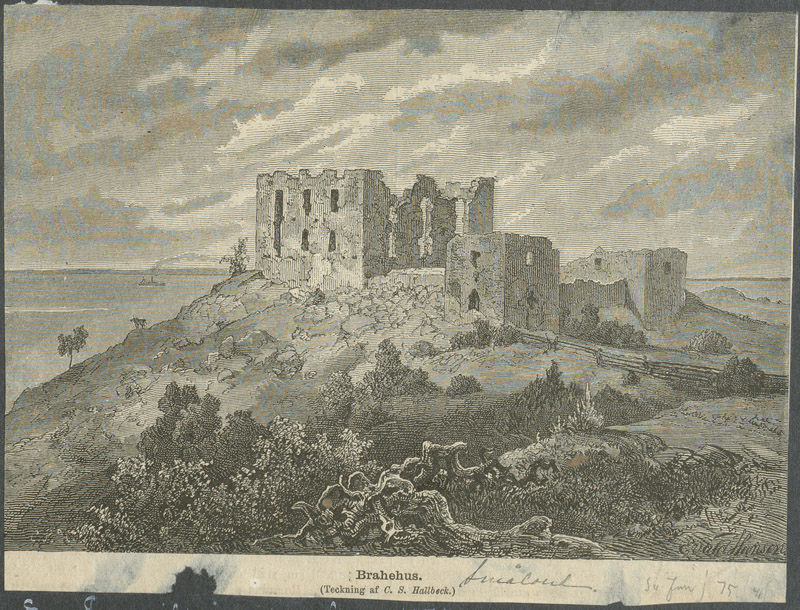

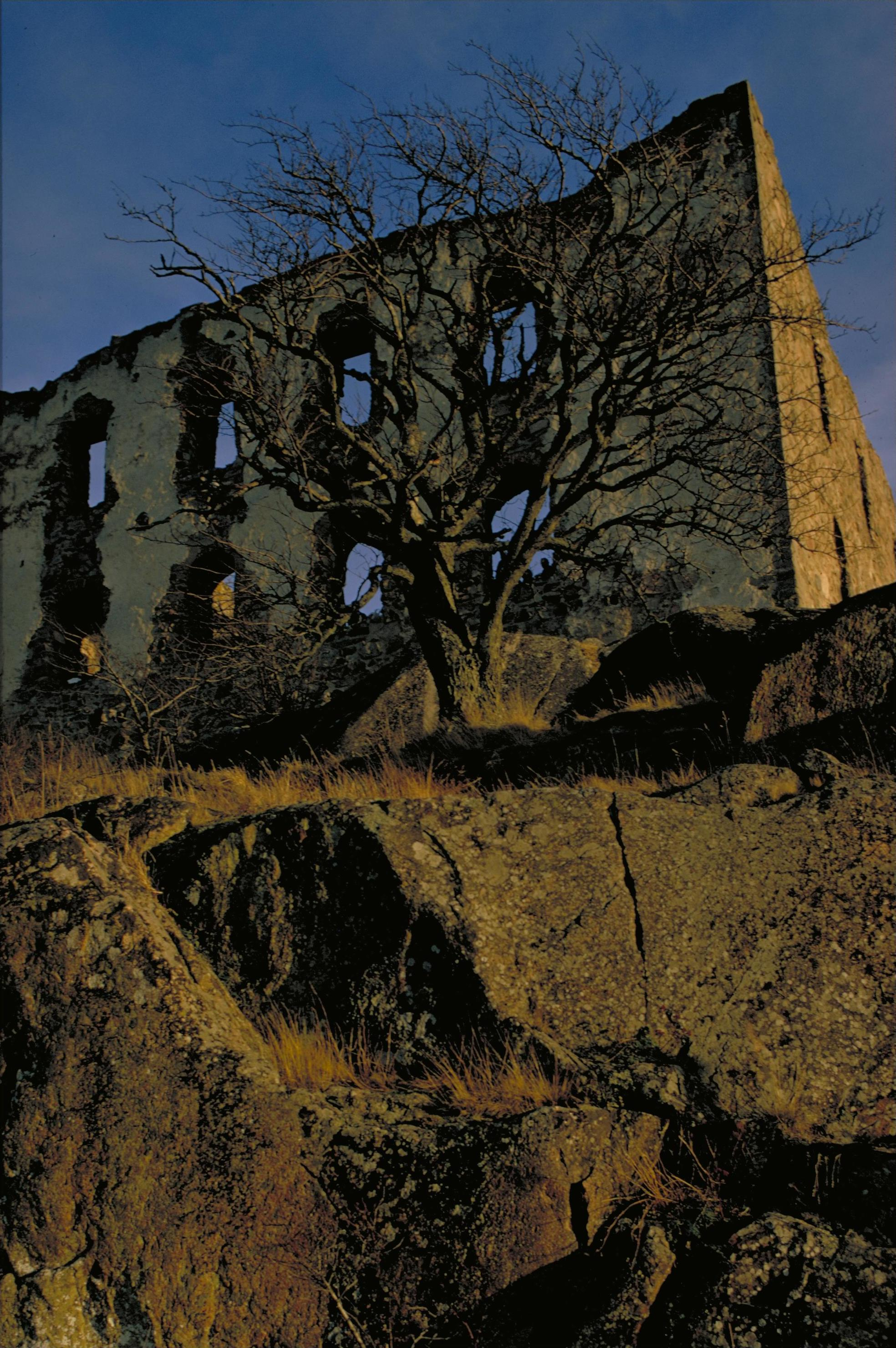

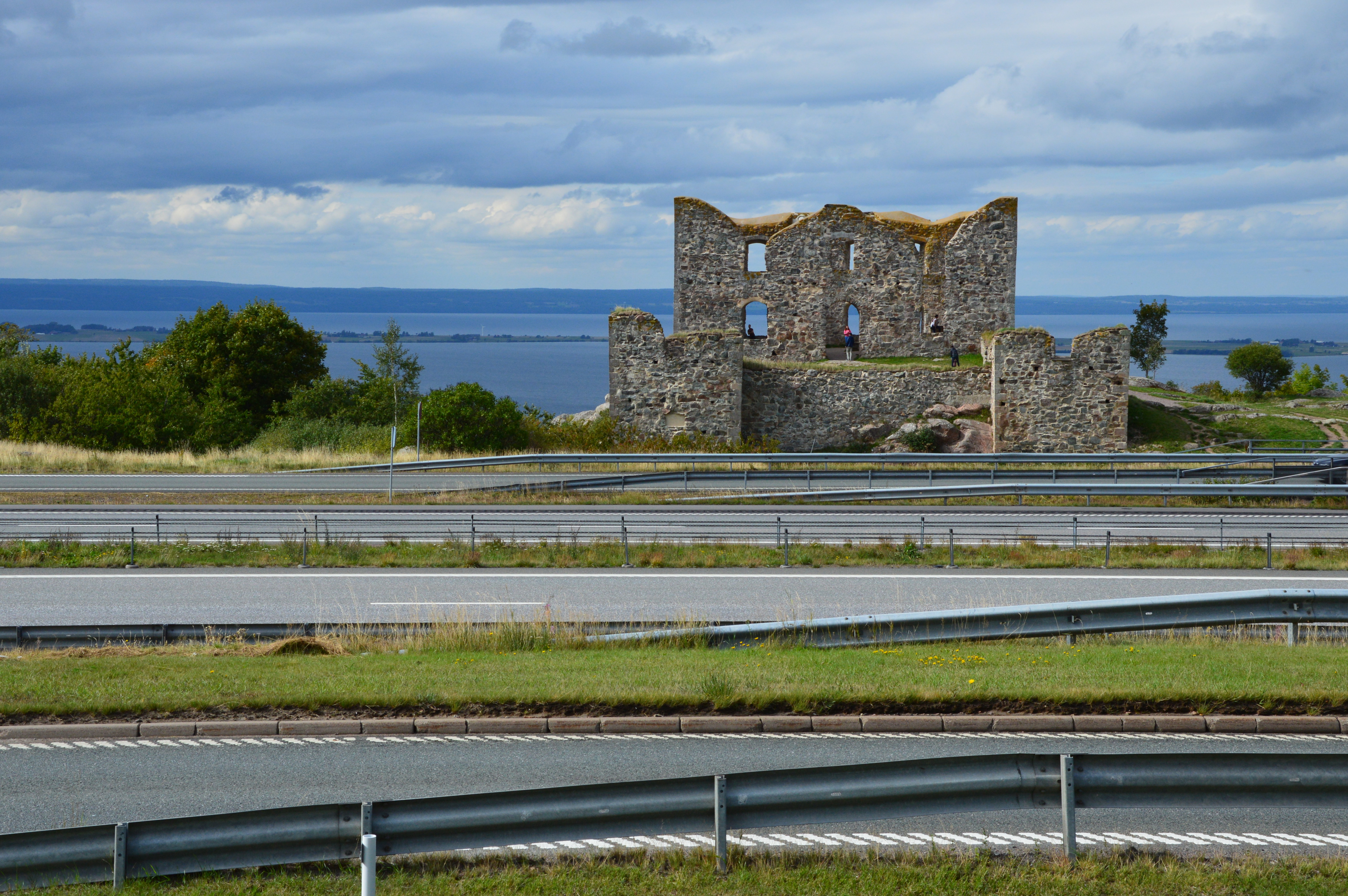

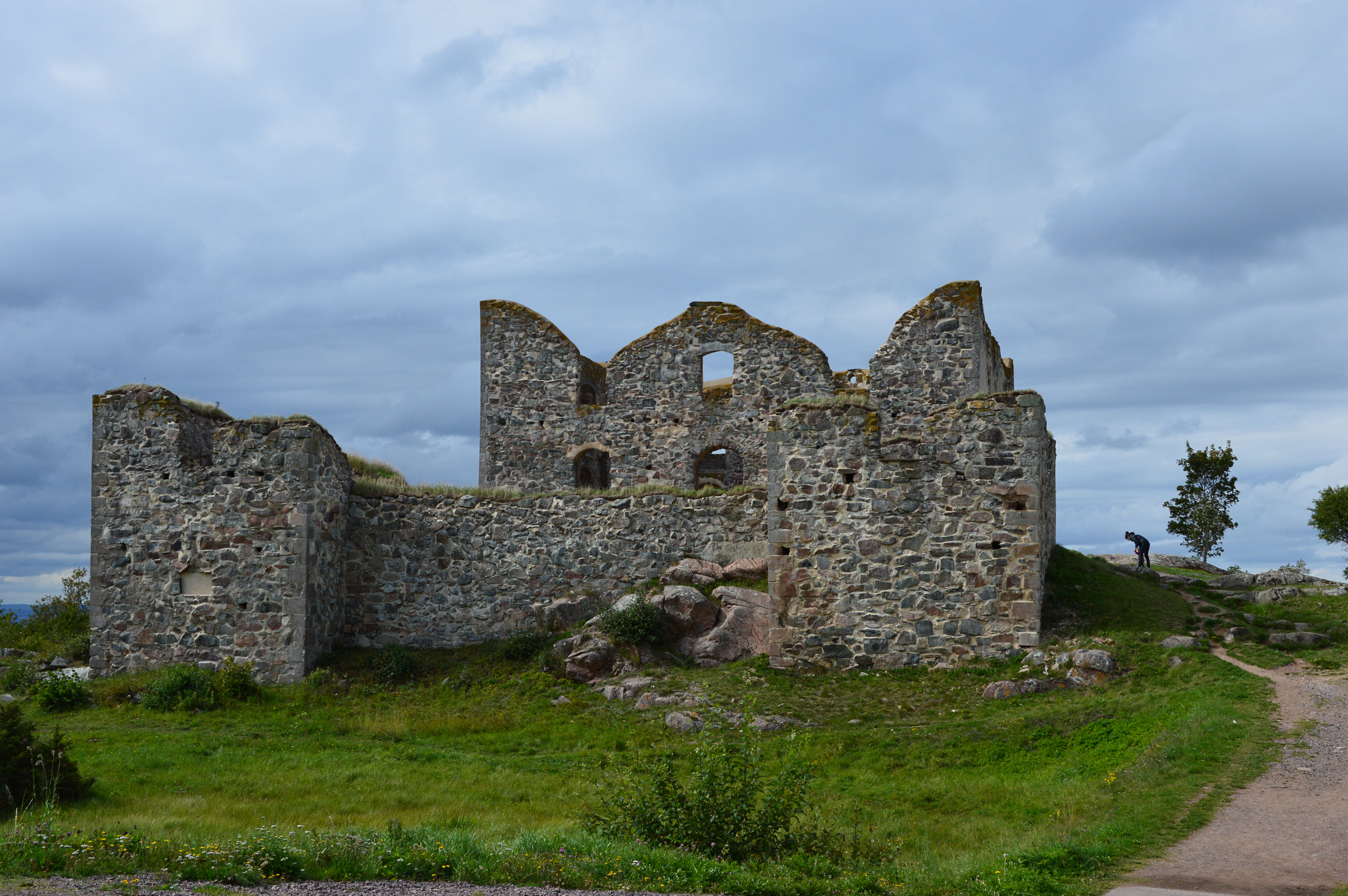

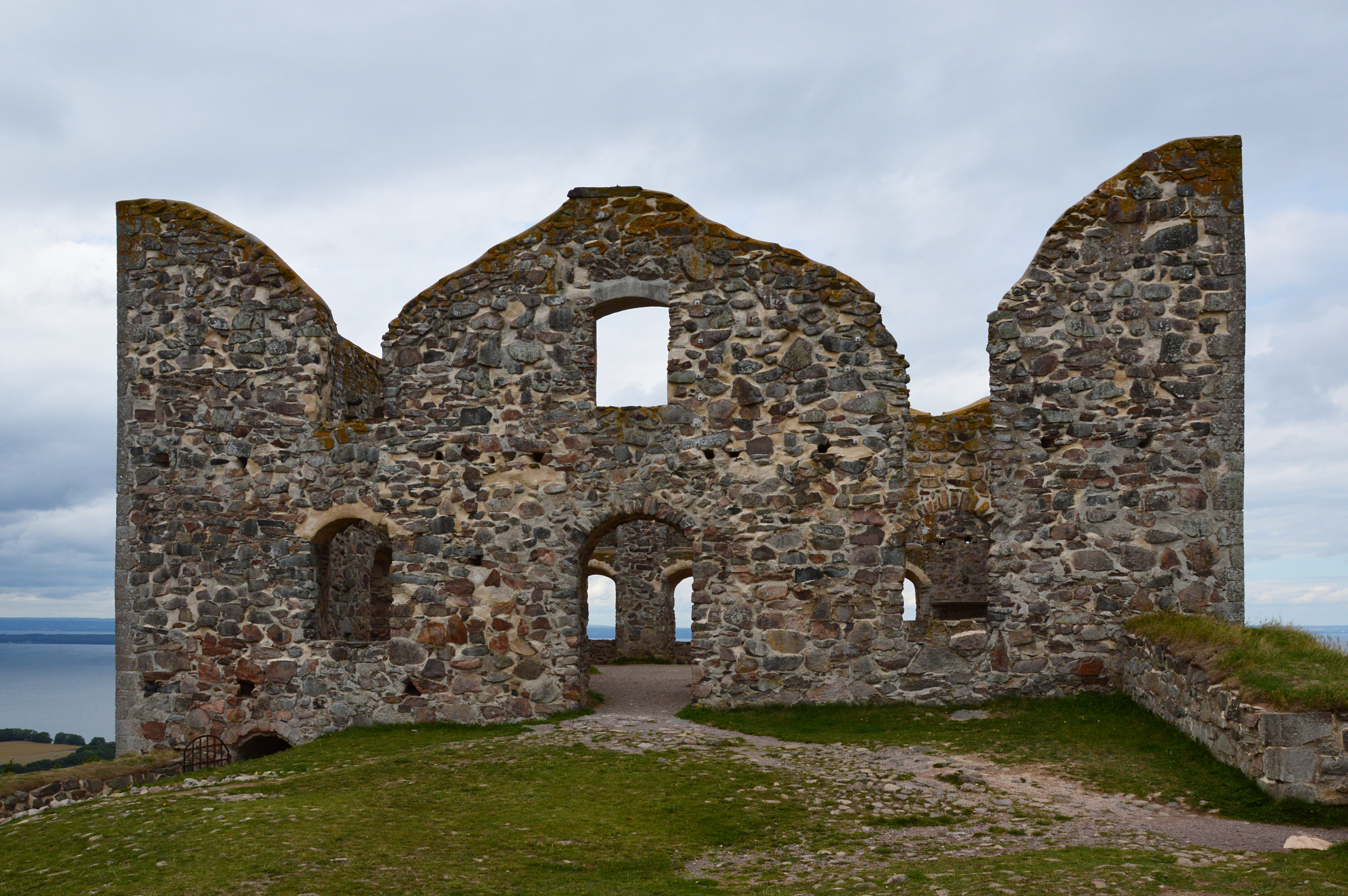

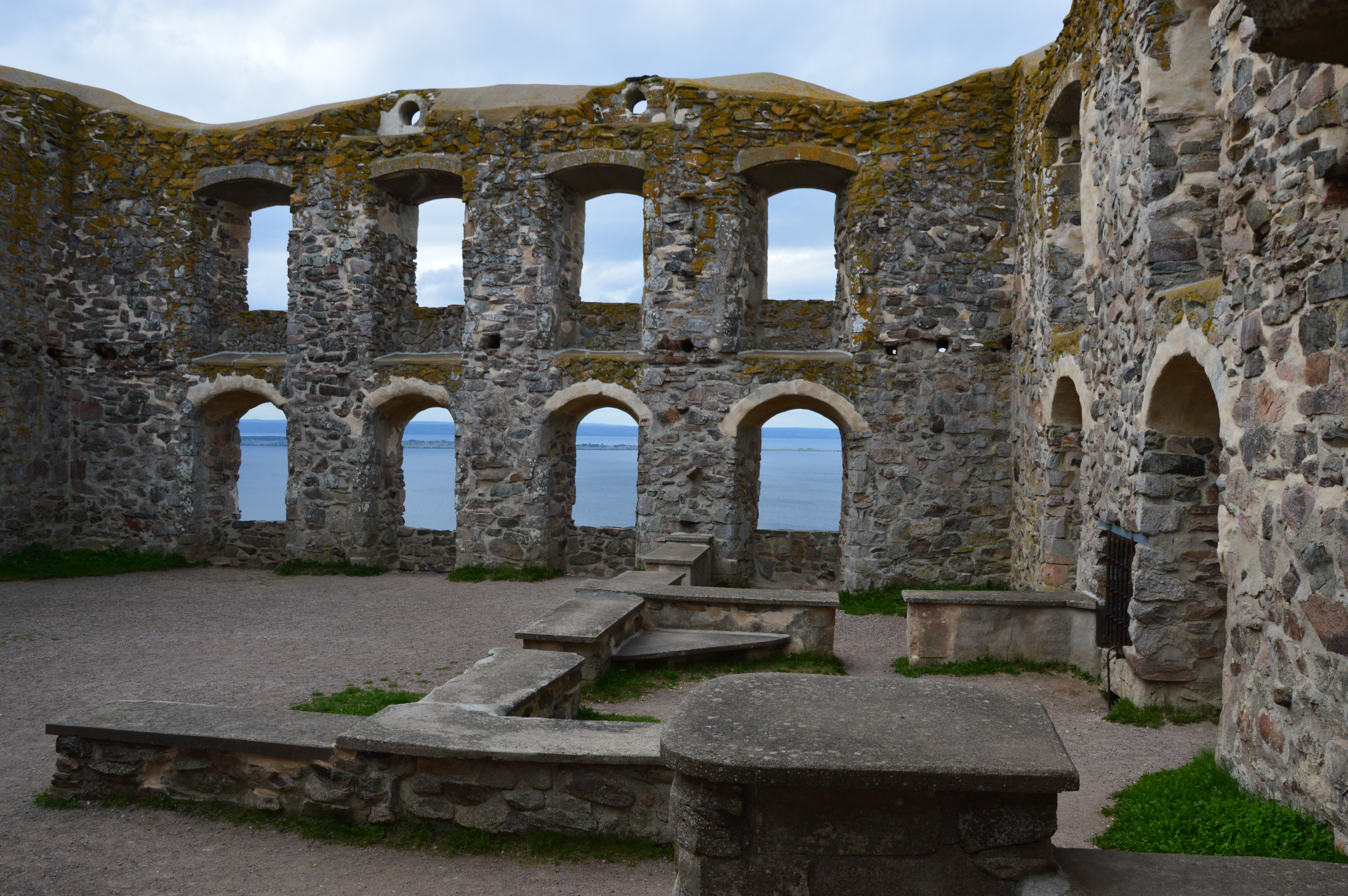
