= Brahe =

Two related Scanian noble families

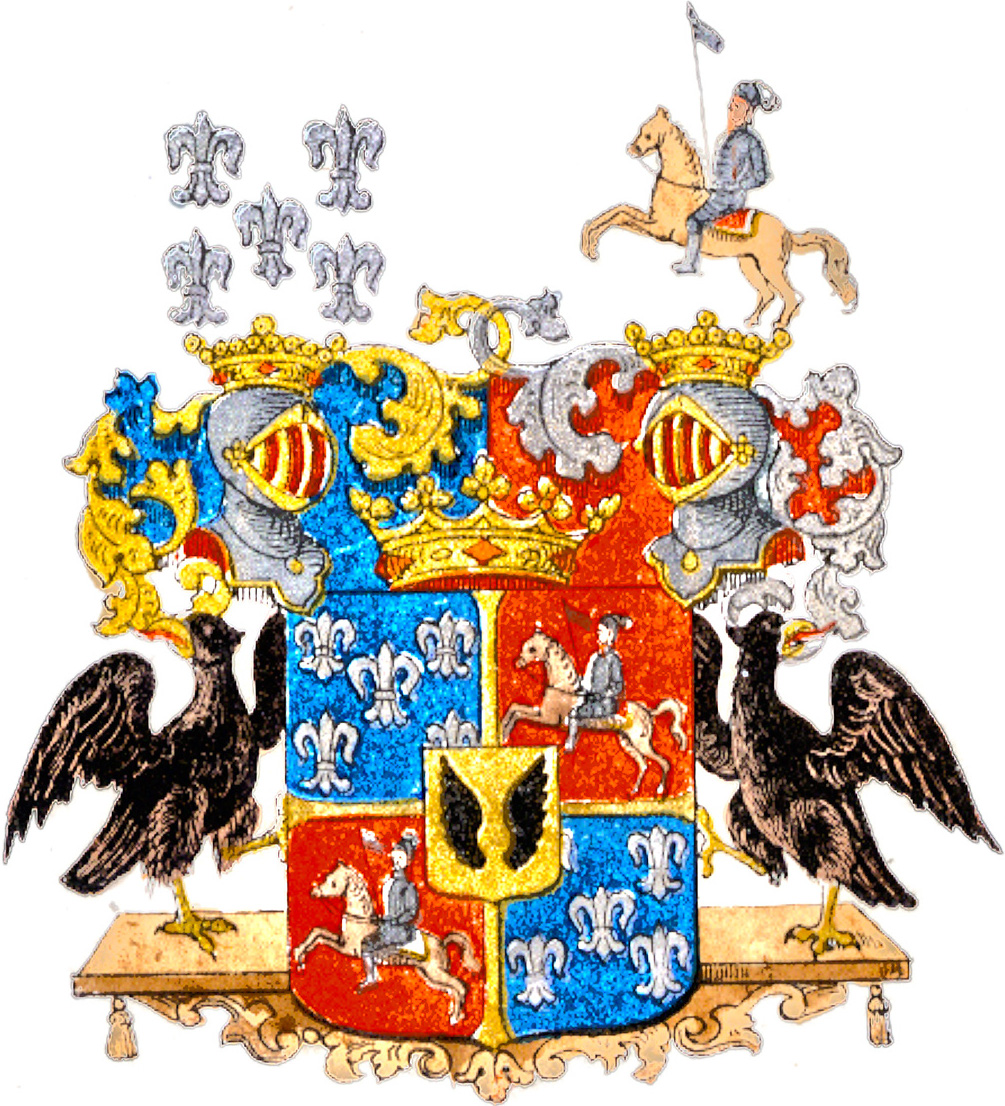
Coat of arms of Brahe family

The Brahe family (originally Bragde) refers to two closely related noble families of Scanian origin that played significant roles in both Danish and Swedish history. The Danish branch became extinct in 1786, and the Swedish branch in 1930.

== Danish family ==
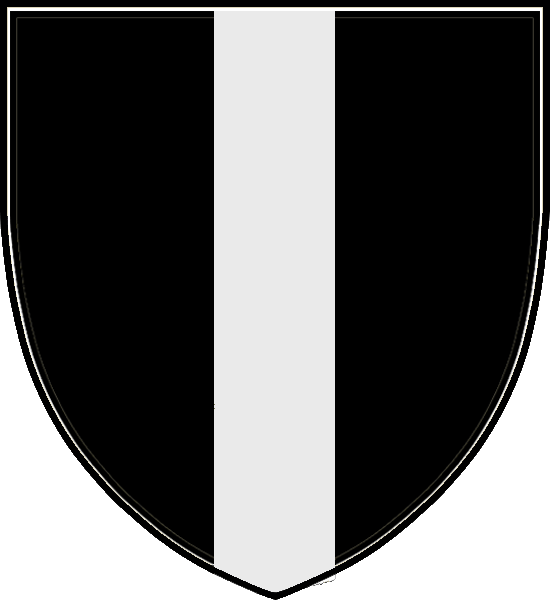
Arms of the Danish Brahe family

The first member of the family using the name Brahe is speculated to have been Verner Braghde from Halland. Better documented is Peder Axelsen Brahe, who appears in late 14th century records. He had two sons, Thorkild and Axel Pedersen Brahe.

The Danish branch descended from Axel, and the Swedish branch descended from Thorkild's daughter, Johanna Torkildsdotter Brahe.

- Jørgen Thygesen Brahe (1515–1565): holder of a seignory
- Otte Brahe (1517–1571): nobleman, governor and member of the Riksråd, brother of Jørgen Thygesen
  - Tycho Brahe (1546–1601): nobleman, astronomer, astrologer and alchemist, son of Otte, raised by Jørgen Thygesen
  - Steen Ottesen Brahe (1547–1620), landowner, member of the Riksråd and chamberlain to Anne of Denmark (queen consort to James VI and I), son of Otte
  - Jørgen Ottesen Brahe (1553–1601): holder of a seignory, son of Otte
  - Sophia Brahe (1556–1643): horticulturalist, healer, historian and astronomer, daughter of Otte
- Sophie Axelsdatter Brahe (1578-1646), noblewoman

== Swedish family ==
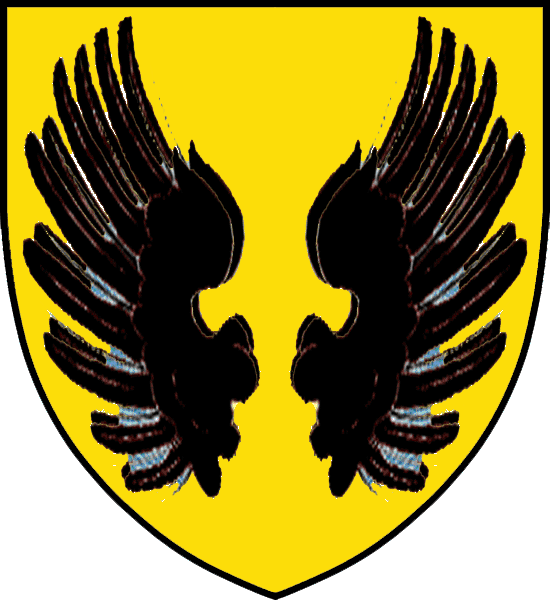
The original arms of the Swedish family

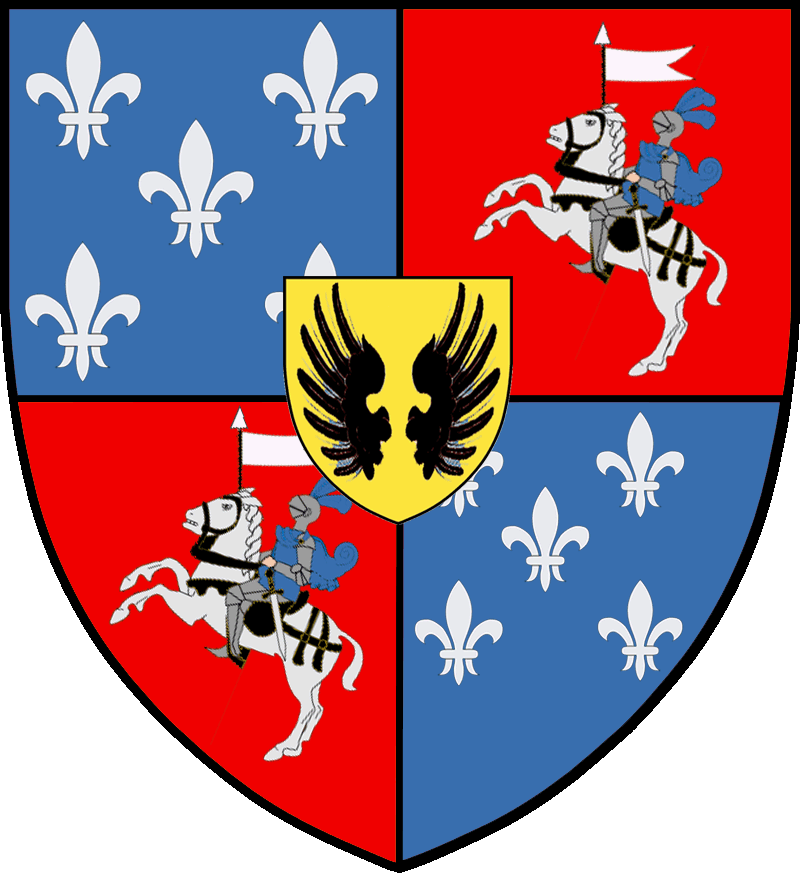
Upgraded arms of the counts of the Swedish Brahe family

Johanna Torkildsdotter from the Danish Brahe family, married Magnus Laurentsson in Sweden. Their son took his mother's family name Brahe, but not her family arms.

Per Brahe was in 1561 granted the title of count by Eric XIV of Sweden, and in 1620 the family was introduced in the House of Nobility (Riddarhuset) as the first counts.

- Per Brahe the Elder (1520–1590): statesman
  - Erik Brahe (1552–1614): Count of Visingsborg
  - Gustaf Brahe (1558–1615), riksråd of Sweden – loyal to king Sigismund – and later, Polish general
  - Magnus Brahe (1564–1633): Lord High Steward of Sweden
    - Ebba Brahe (1596–1674): lady-in-waiting and mistress of future King Gustavus Adolphus, wife of Jakob De la Gardie
  - Abraham Brahe (1569–1630): Swedish Count
    - Per Brahe the Younger (1602–1680): soldier and statesman
    - Margareta Brahe (1603–1669): lady-in-waiting for Queen Maria Eleonora and Queen Christina of Sweden, consort of Gustavus Adolphus
    - Nils Brahe (1604–1632): General in the Swedish army
      - Nils Brahe (1633–1699): Swedish count, statesman, admiral and lieutenant general
- Erik Brahe (1722–1756): Marshal and Colonel
- Magnus Fredrik Brahe (1756–1826): Swedish Count
  - Magnus Brahe (1790–1844): statesman and soldier

== See also ==
- Gøye family

== Other sources ==
- Carlsson, Gottfrid Brahe (släkt) Svenskt biografiskt lexikon, bd 5, s. 637-641.
- Weibull, Lauritz (1904) Sophia Brahe. Bidrag till den genealogiska forskningen i Danmark (Historical Journal för Skåne Country, s. 38-71)
