= Nils Brahe =

Swedish general (1604–1632)

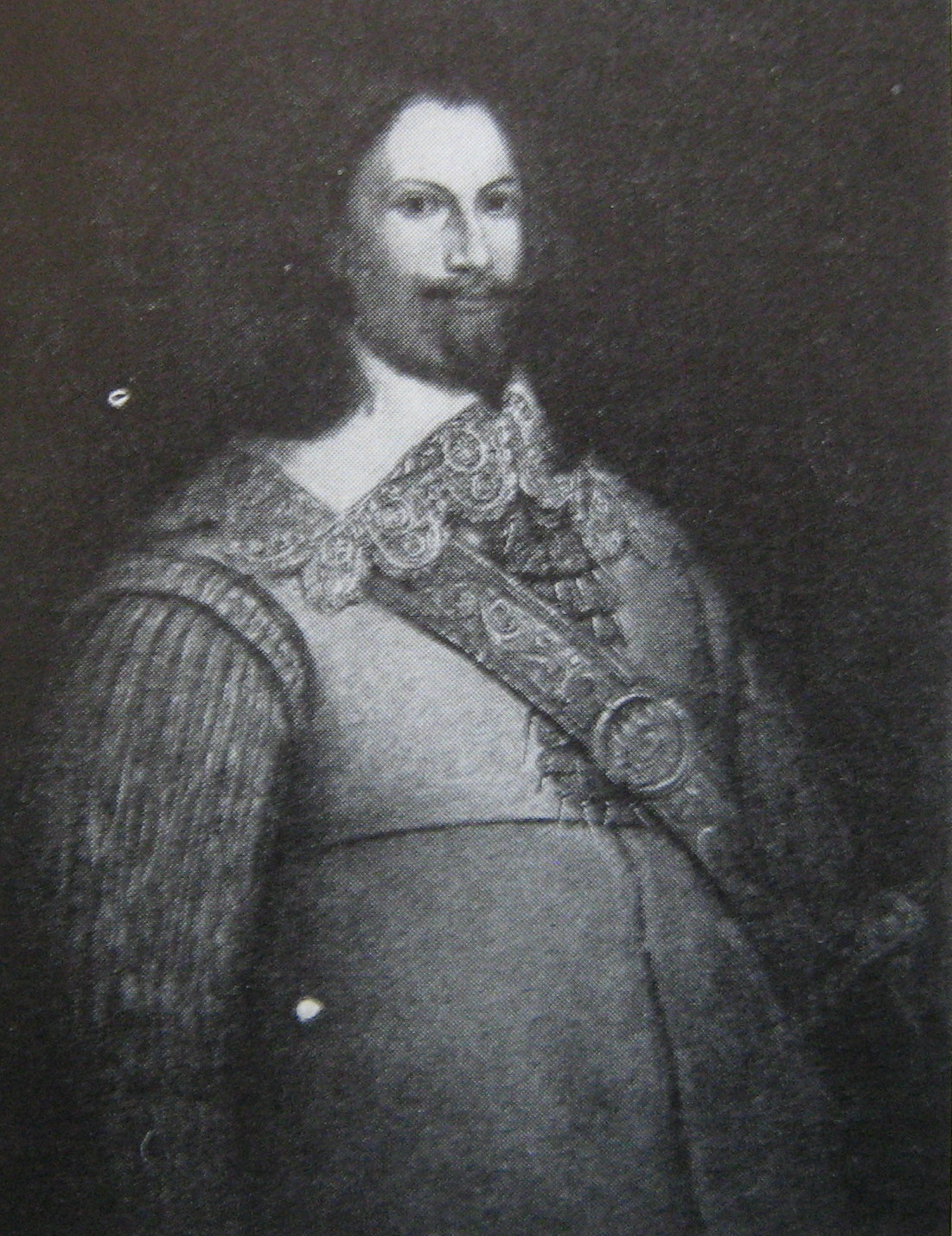
- Nils Brahe
- Born: 14 October 1604; Rydboholm Castle, Sweden
- Died: 21 November 1632 (aged 28) Naumburg, Germany
- Allegiance: Sweden
- Rank: General
- Conflicts: Polish–Swedish War (1621–1625); Siege of Riga (1621); Polish–Swedish War (1626–1629); Thirty Years' War; Capture of Würzburg; Battle of Lützen (1632) (WIA)

Count Nils Brahe (14 October 1604 – 21 November 1632) was a Swedish soldier and younger brother of Per Brahe and Margareta Brahe. He served with distinction under King Gustavus Adolphus, who regarded him as the best general in the Swedish army after Lennart Torstenson.

== Life ==
Brahe was born at Rydboholm Castle (now in Österåker Municipality) in Uppland. He was the son of riksråd Count Abraham Pedersson Brahe of Visingsborg (1569-1630) and Elsa Gyllenstierna of Lundholm, and as such the brother of Margareta Brahe and Per Brahe, and the cousin of Ebba Brahe.

He took part in the Polish-Swedish Wars, in which he first participated in the siege and capture of Riga 1621, and later served with distinction in Poland (1626–1627) and assisted in the defence of Stralsund in 1628. On 16 April 1628 he married baroness Anna Margareta Bielke at the Stockholm castle, at double wedding, when also his elder brother count Peder Brahe married Kristina Katarina Stenbock.

In 1630 he accompanied Gustavus into Germany, in the Thirty Years' War and in 1631 was appointed colonel of "the yellow regiment," the king's world-renowned life-guards, at the head of which he captured the castle of Würzburg on 8 October 1631. Brahe took part in the long duel between Gustavus and Wallenstein around Nuremberg as general of infantry, and commanded the left wing during the Battle of Lützen on 6 November 1632, where he was the only Swedish general officer present. At the very beginning of the fight he received a gunshot wound to his left knee so severe that he had to retire from the battle. After the fighting ended Brahe travelled to Naumburg to recuperate but his condition deteriorated over the next few weeks and he finally died on 21 November 1632, at the age of 28. Brahe was buried in the church at Östra Ryd.

== See also ==
- Nils Nilsson Brahe, his son
- Nils Magnus Brahe
