= Västanå Manor =

Coordinates: 57°59′24″N 14°25′16″E

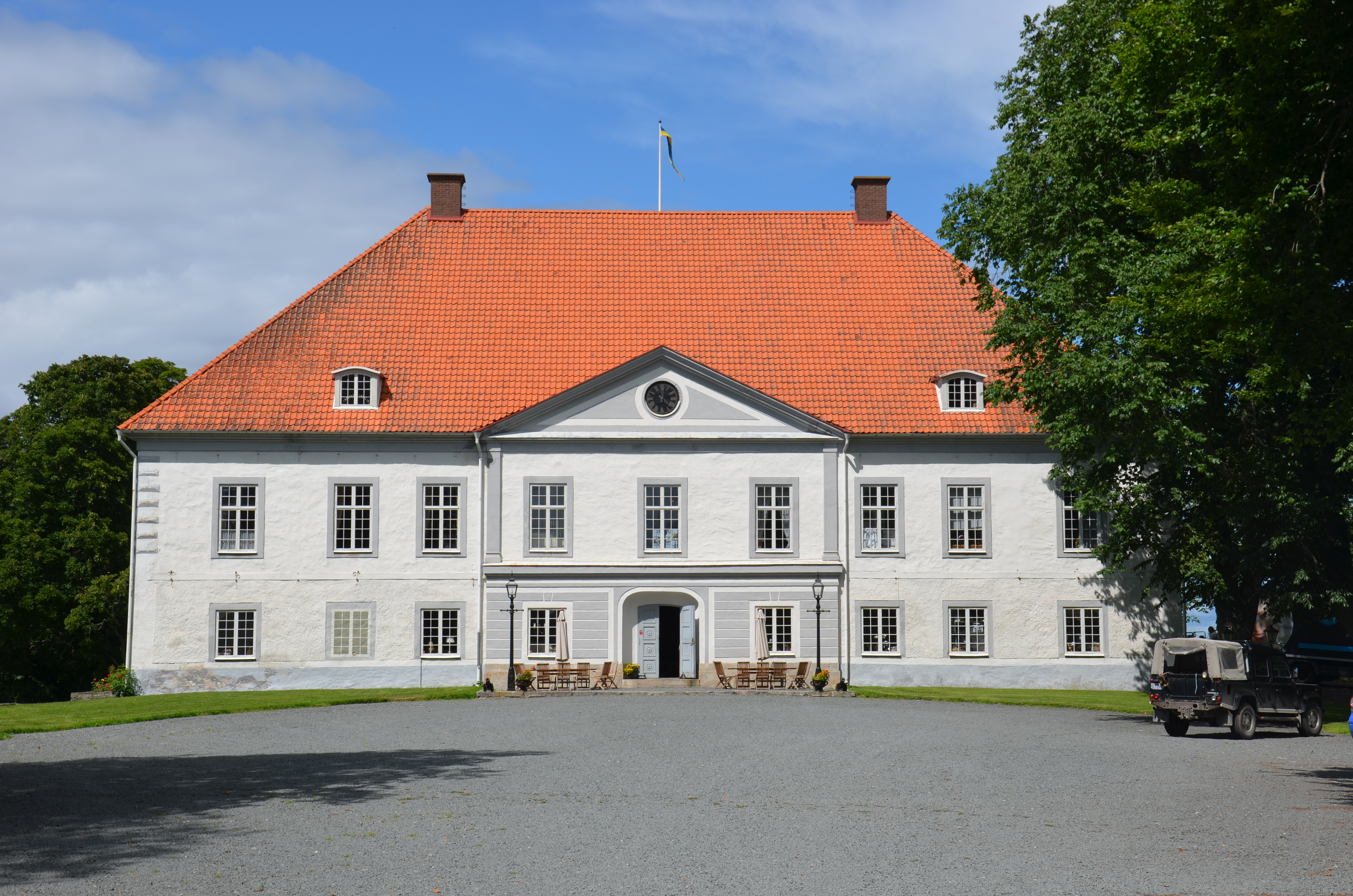
Västanå slott

Västanå Manor (Swedish: Västanå slott) is a manor house in Gränna parish in Jönköping Municipality, Sweden.

== History ==
The estate probably dates from the 14th century, when it was the property of the Ulfsparre family. It stayed in the family for seven generations, until the mid-17th century when it was sold in 1641 to soldier and statesman Per Brahe the Younger (1602–1680). He ordered the construction of the present main building. In 1728, it passed into the Hamilton family. It was shortly thereafter sold and subsequently belonged to several different families. The main building was rebuilt in 1767–70, during the ownership of Rutger Bennet (1720-1791).

In the years 1928–30, Rolf Gyllensvaan von Otter (1891–1967) carried out thorough repairs. At that time, the third floor was removed and the castle received its present appearance. Västanå Manor is a large high-rise, two-store building. Since 1948, Västanå has been a hotel, conference center and restaurant. The facility is operated by the members of the von Otter family.
