= Skokloster Castle =

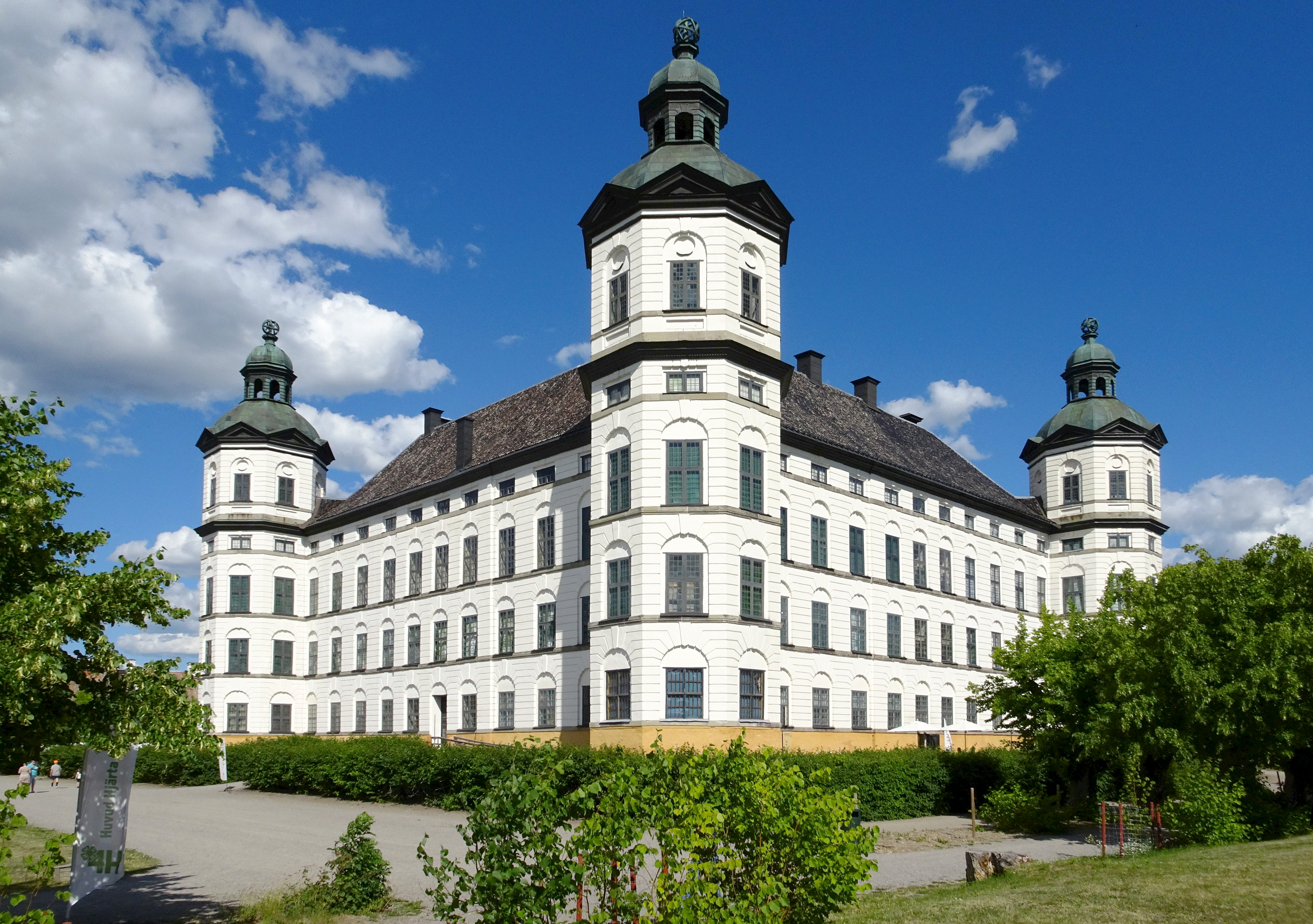
- Facade facing west, July 2018
- Interactive fullscreen map

General information
- Architectural style: Baroque
- Location: Håbo Municipality, Sweden
- Coordinates: 59°42′11″N 17°37′17″E
- Construction started: 1654
- Completed: 1676 (unfinished)

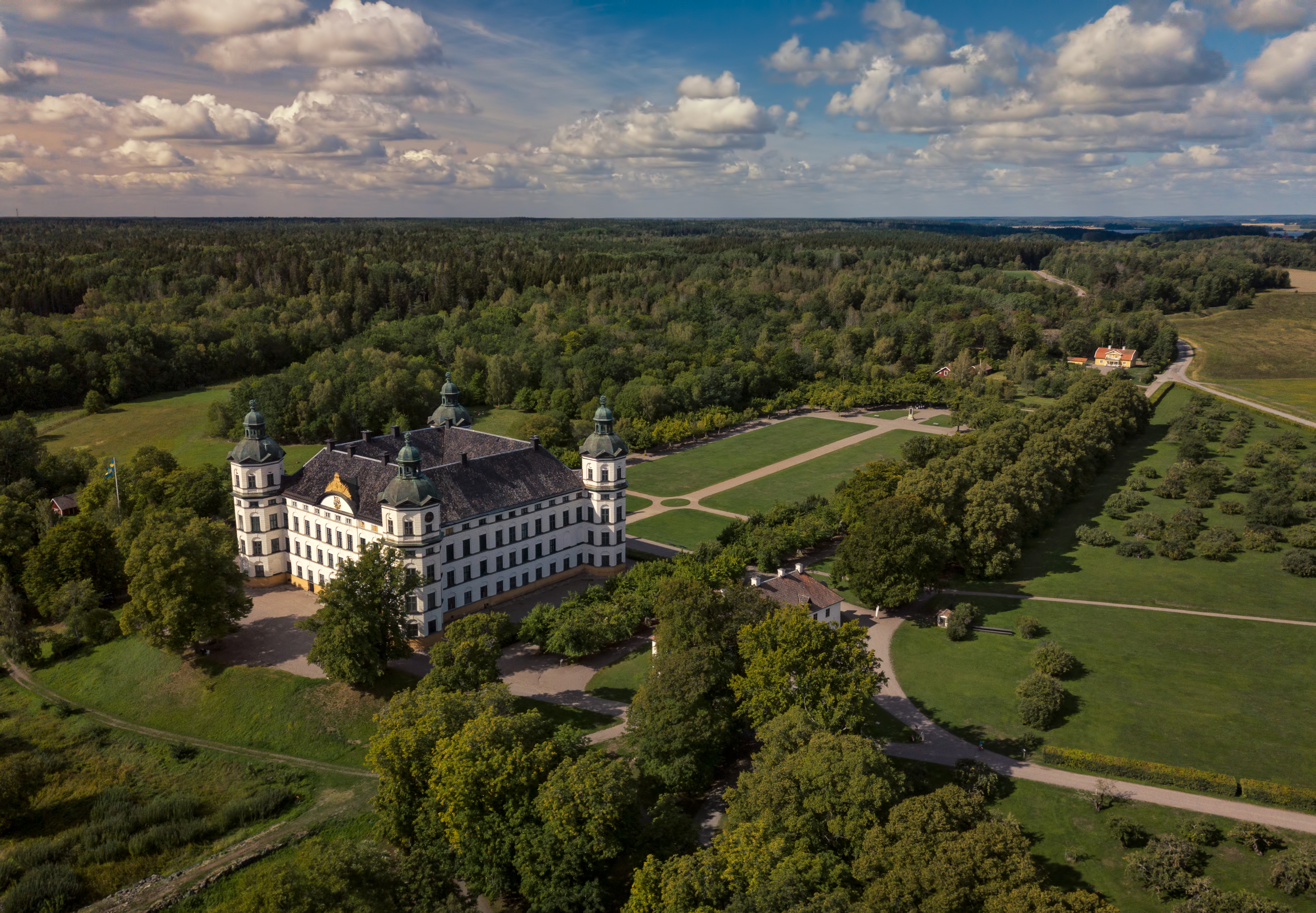
Aerial view of Skokloster Castle

Skokloster Castle (Swedish: Skoklosters slott) is a Swedish Baroque castle built between 1654 and 1676 by Carl Gustaf Wrangel, located on a peninsula of Lake Mälaren between Stockholm and Uppsala. It became a state museum in the 1970s and displays collections of paintings, furniture, textiles and tableware as well as books and weapons that amount to 20,000 items.

== History ==
The castle was built in the Baroque style between 1654 and 1676 by the wealthy military commander count Carl Gustaf Wrangel on a peninsula of Lake Mälaren between Stockholm and Uppsala. It was designed mainly by architect Casper Vogell, and other architects involved were Jean de la Vallée and Nicodemus Tessin the Elder. It is probable, that castle was built based on Ujazdów Castle in Warsaw, Poland.

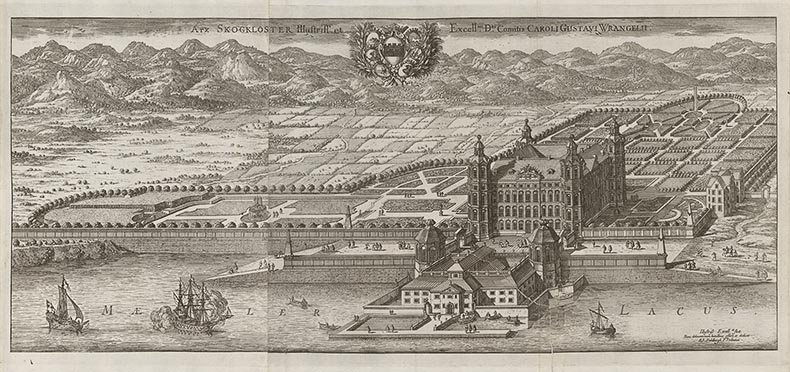
The Castle and its planned surroundings ca 1690–1710.

The castle is a monument to the Swedish Age of Greatness, a period in the mid-17th century when Sweden expanded to become one of the major powers in Europe. The death of Wrangel in 1676 meant that the castle was never fully completed. Nils Brahe the younger, who inherited the castle after Wrangel's death, had other family castles and did not complete the interiors.

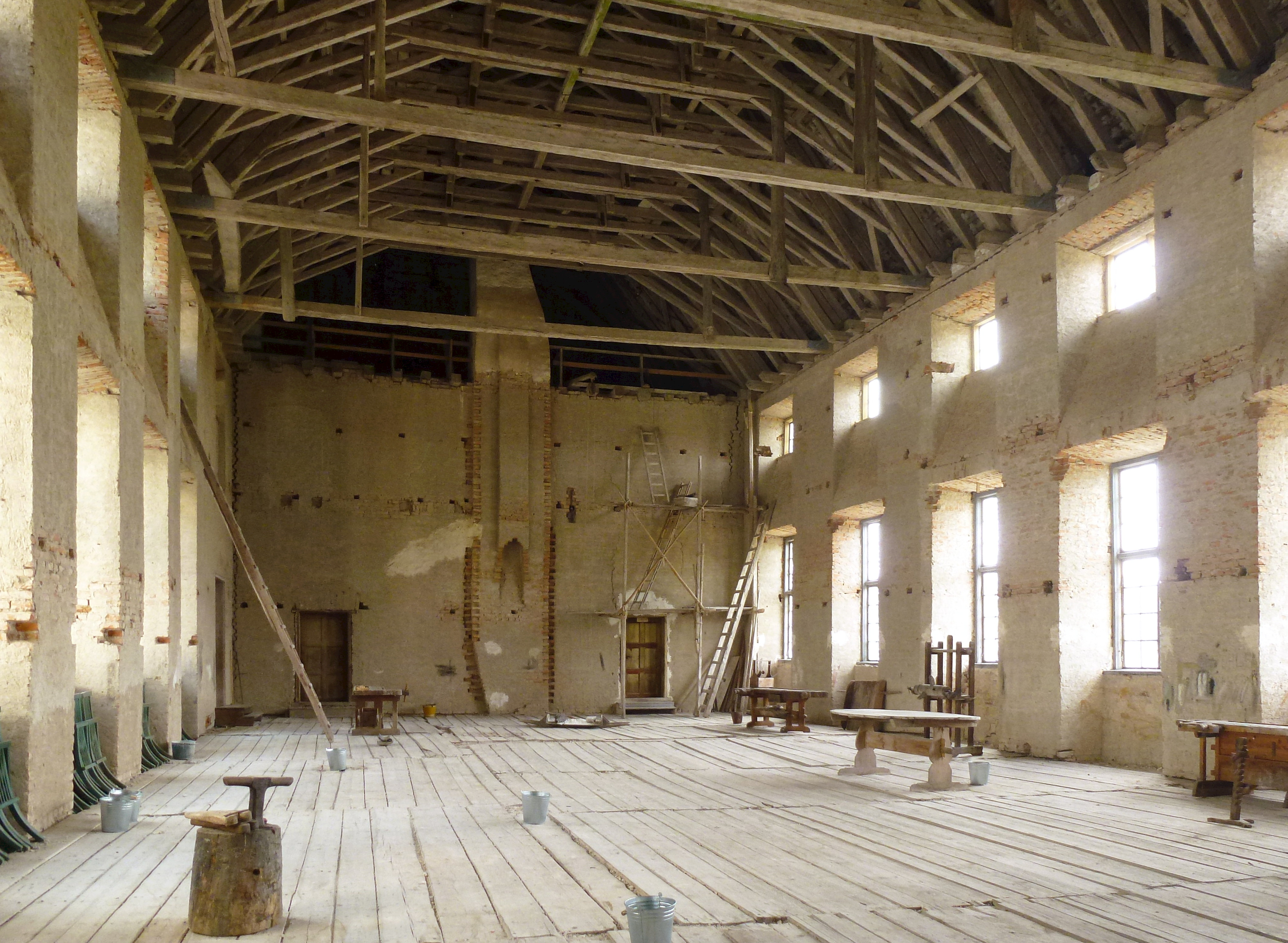
The Unfinished Hall.

As a result, a large banqueting hall remains largely in the same condition as the builders left it in the summer of 1676. It is now known as the Unfinished Hall. Skokloster Castle is the only building in Europe to preserve a complete 17th-century building site of comparable authenticity. Alongside the Unfinished Hall are several hundred tools and about a dozen books on construction from the same period.

The castle was converted into a permanent residence after the Second World War, when the von Essen family moved in. An apartment was built on the bottom floor with central heating, a modern bathroom and electricity. The upper floors were to be preserved as a museum. The renovation was carried out in two steps in 1947 and 1952, creating a modern living space inside the castle.

In 1967, the von Essen family, who inherited the castle from Brahe when the family died out in 1930, sold the castle and its contents to the Swedish government; Skokloster Castle became a state museum and government agency named the Royal Armoury and Skokloster Castle with the Hallwyl Museum Foundation (LSH). the family still resides in the vicinity.

In the 1970s, architect Ove Hidemark renovated the castle by using the same materials and building techniques as in the 17th century, constituting a benchmark in Swedish conservation techniques.

The interiors of the castle are thought to be especially well preserved, considering that it is without modern heating in a cold climate. A thorough renovation of the roof was undertaken with a second stage of the renovation commencing in March 2015, as the roof had leaked resulting in mold and damage especially to the paintings.

== Museum collections ==
The painting Vertumnus by Arcimboldo is part of the castle collection.

The finished parts of the castle display the full, sumptuous splendour of the Baroque. Its detailed chambers are home to collections of paintings, furniture, textiles and silver and glass tableware. One of the most famous paintings is the 16th century Vertumnus by Italian master Giuseppe Arcimboldo, depicting the face of Holy Roman emperor Rudolf II as the Roman god of the seasons using fruits and vegetables. In 1648, the painting was taken as war booty by Swedish troops during the sack of Prague and subsequently transported to Stockholm.

The castle armoury and library are noteworthy, both founded on Wrangel's collections of weapons and books and enriched and enlarged by other 17th- and 18th-century aristocratic bequests, such as those by Carl Gustaf Bielke. The library contains both terrestrial and celestial globes by Anders Åkerman.

The armoury contains the largest collection of personal 17th century military weapons in the world. Mostly muskets and pistols, along with swords, including Japanese swords, as well as small cannons, pikes, and crossbows. The weapons collection also includes various exotic items such as a 16th-century Eskimo canoe and snake skins. The original scale model of the castle, which the architect Caspar Vogel had made to demonstrate his plan to Count Wrangel, is also there. A large part of the collection are war spoils looted from Poland during the Deluge in the 17th century.

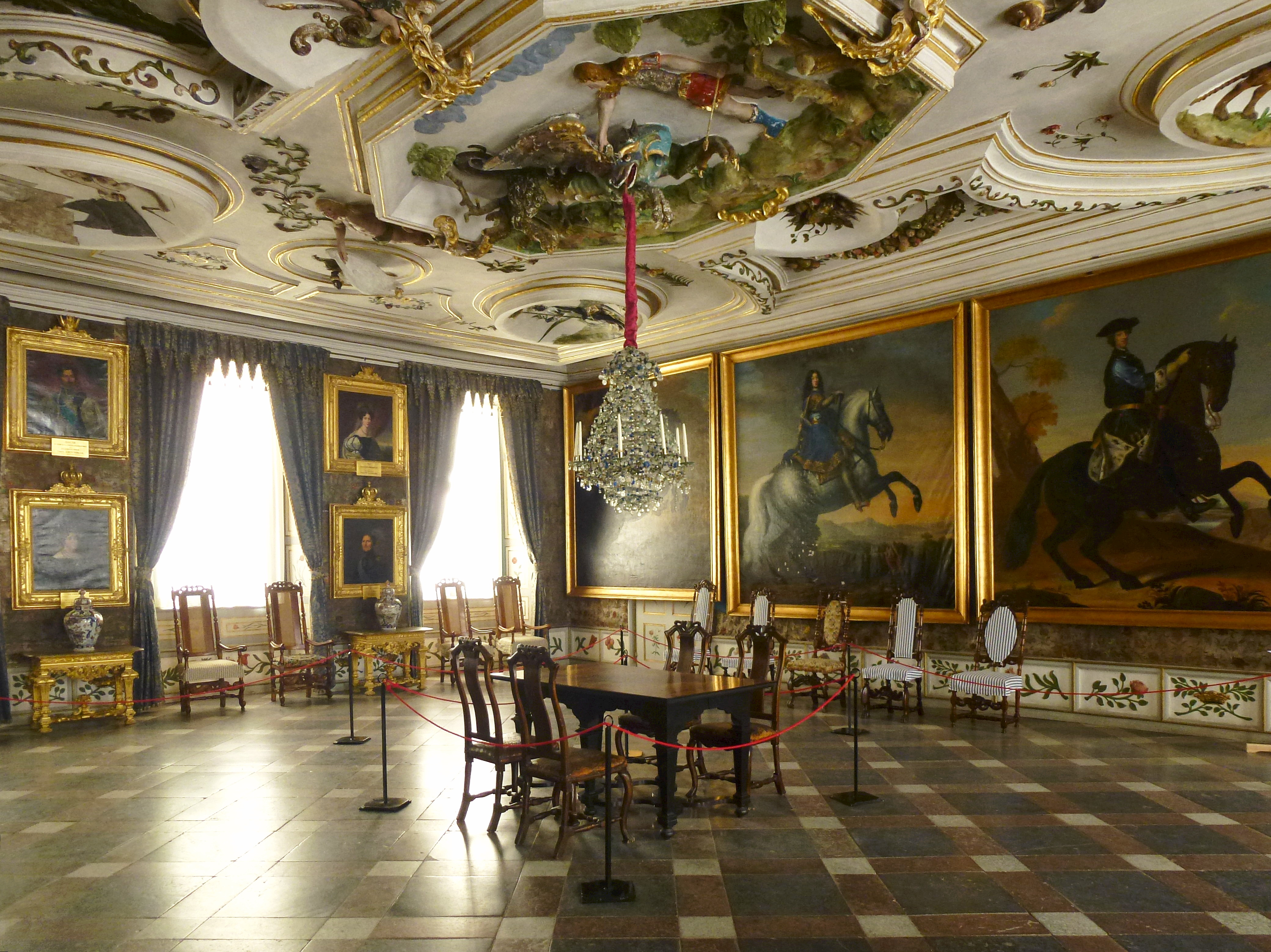
King's Hall

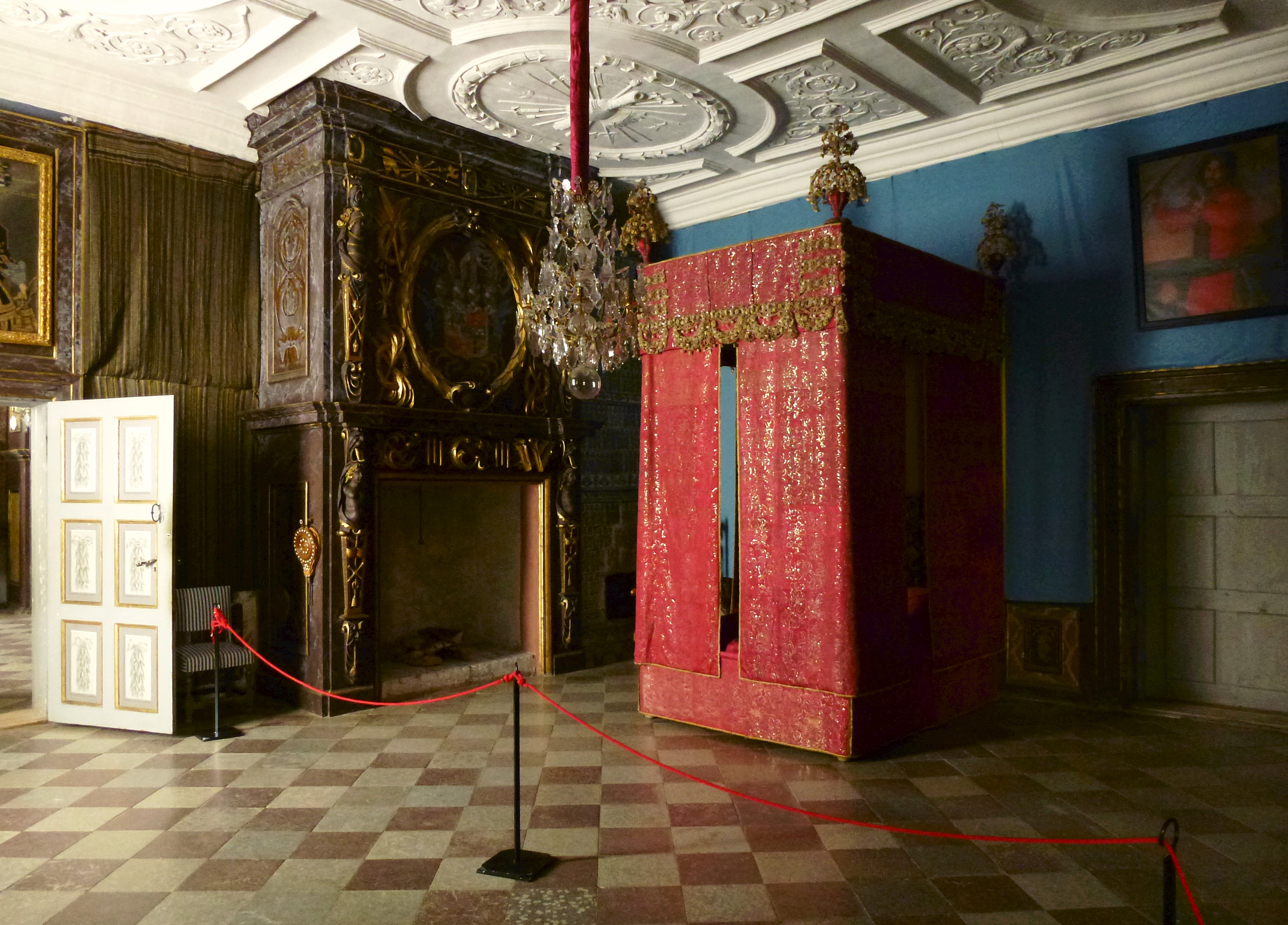
Wrangel's Bedroom

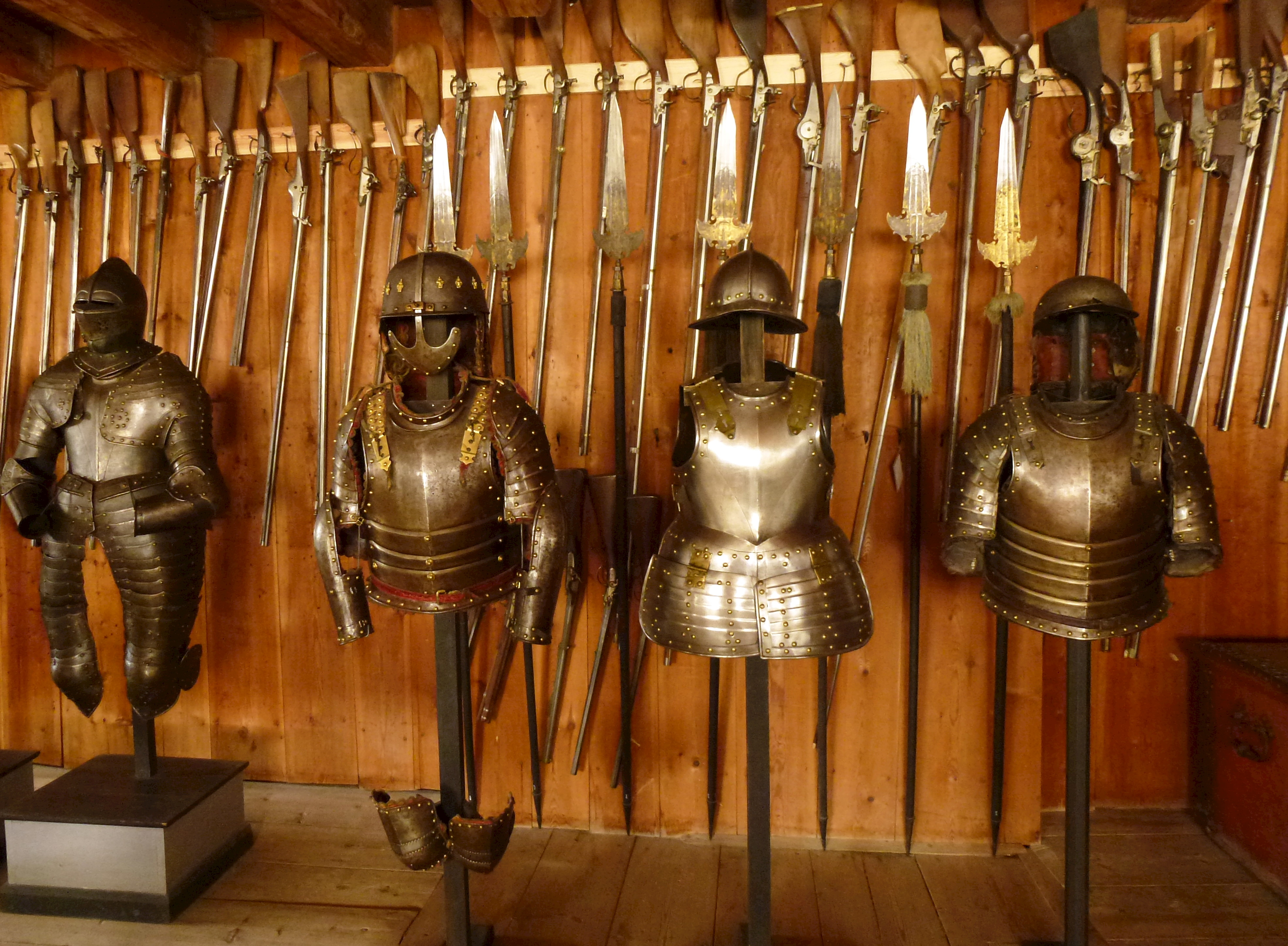
Weapons Arsenal
