= Siege of Itzehoe =

Dano-Swedish siege

- Part of the Dano-Swedish War (1657–1658)
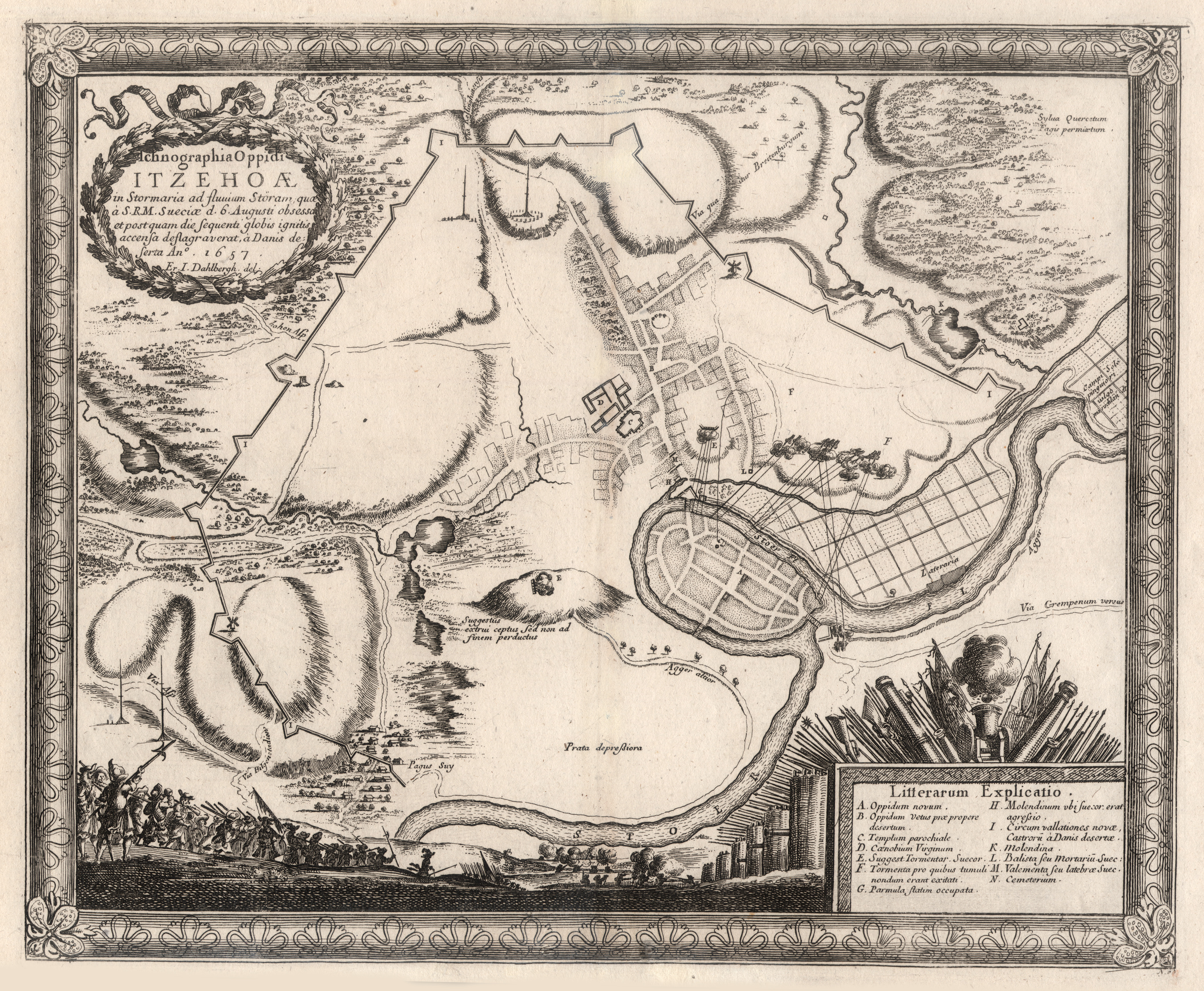
- Depiction of the siege by Erik Dahlbergh
Date	6–11 August 1657
Location	Itzehoe, Holstein
Result	Swedish victory
Territorial changes	Itzehoe is captured by Swedish forces

Belligerents
(yes) Swedish Empire	Denmark–Norway

Commanders and leaders
(Swedish Empire) Charles X Gustav (Swedish Empire) Nils Brahe (Swedish Empire) Erik Dahlbergh	Unknown

Units involved
Uppland Regiment	(Denmark–Norway) Itzehoe garrison

Strength
Unknown	300 men

Casualties and losses
3 killed	Heavy

The siege of Itzehoe was initiated by Sweden on 6 August 1657, while chasing the retreating Danish army after the failed campaign in Bremen-Verden. Charles X Gustav, the king of Sweden, ordered the town to be bombarded into submission, which unintentionally led to massive fires breaking out in the city, forcing the defenders to withdraw on 11 August.

== Background ==
Already before operations had ended in Bremen, the Swedish army began advancing northwards. Initially, the Swedes didn't encounter any retreating Danes, aside from undefended sconces, small towns, and people who retreated too slowly or were unwilling to do so, thus being quickly taken as prisoners of war on the way.

== Siege ==
On 6 August, the Swedish army reached Itzehoe, which was not only defended but also well situated, or rather hard to access. The outerworks were large, and were meant to defend an army camp. However, this would not happen, and thus they were undefended, with these being captured by the Uppland Regiment led by Nils Brahe. However, the town itself was situated on an island in the middle of a river, thus being surrounded by water. The 300 Danish soldiers that defended the town, noticing the situation, treaded with caution.

As usual, without time for a prolonged siege, King Charles ordered the town to be bombarded into submission. Such bombardments, usually targeted at civilian populations and their houses, had been tested by the Swedes during the Deluge, most recently during a Swedish attack on Brzesc. The Swedish gunners were also known for their skills pertaining to firing incendiary cannon balls, which were cheap but effective. To put further pressure on the defenders, the king ordered that the town be bombarded with explosive rounds as well.

The Swedish cannons were put north of Itzehoe, and Erik Dahlbergh was ordered to oversee a heavy 280-pound mortar, which was placed at the bottom of a hill, near a road. Erik was also agitated, since he had previously nearly been struck by a cannonball fired from the defenders. The idea for the mortar was that its round should explode just as it reached its destination, but this would not happen. Instead, when the fuse was ignited, there was a bright flash, with a sharp and loud bang, and the shell had detonated inside the barrel of the mortar. It was reported as the following:

blev tre stycken döda, fyrverkaren blesserad, och den som tände på granaten föll neder till jorden, och blodet rann igenom mun, näsa, ögon och lron, dock beskyddade den Högstes mäktiga arm mig och denna gången för olycka.

However, such accidents were very ordinary, and the rest of the bombardment continued as normal. Within an hour, the Swedish incendiary and explosive rounds had started a "terrible fire" which soon spread rapidly over all parts of Itzehoe, new and old. Soon, the entire town was burning, with flames and smoke everywhere. The river, which had once protected the citizens, now became their fate. Many people, now without a way to escape, sought refuge in the town's fortifications. The Swedish soldiers reported that they were able to see half-naked people running along the ramparts, where they attempted to protect themselves from the fire by covering themselves in dirt. The exact number of dead is unknown, but it was "many".

In between the burning houses and smoking ruins, the Swedish cavalry sprang forward, capturing the undefended fortifications in the north and west. On the same day, 8 August, the Danes retreated from two nearby sconces, Kreuzchanze, situated by Heiligenstedten and the Krummerdeichschanze, which were immediately conquered by the Swedes.

On August 11, the defenders abandoned the ruins of the town, where only 12 houses had survived, and fled across a bridge leading them southeast. The retreat had the consequence of removing the last Danes from Holstein.

== Aftermath ==
Erik Dahlbergh was tasked with leading the destruction of Itzehoe's outerworks. Thousands of soldiers worked tirelessly for two days to complete the demolition, after which they pursued the retreating Danish forces.

== Works cited ==
- Englund, Peter (2000). Den oövervinnerlige: om den svenska stormaktstiden och en man i dess mitt [The invincible: about the era of Swedish great power and a man in its midst] (in Swedish). Atlantis. ISBN 9789174869996.
- Isacson, Claes-Göran (2015). Karl X Gustavs krig: Fälttågen i Polen, Tyskland, Baltikum, Danmark och Sverige 1655-1660 [Wars of Charles X Gustav: The campaigns in Poland, Germany, the Baltics, Denmark and Sweden 1655-1660] (in Swedish). Historiska Media. ISBN 9789175450117.
- Bonnesen, Sten (1924). Karl X Gustav [Charles X Gustav] (in Swedish). Gleerups.
