= Per Brahe the Younger =

Swedish noble (1602–1680)

Count Per Brahe the Younger
- Portrait by David Beck, c. 1650

Lord High Steward of Sweden
- In office 1641–1680
- Preceded by: Gabriel Gustafsson Oxenstierna
- Succeeded by: Magnus Gabriel De la Gardie

Governor-General of Finland
- In office 1637–1640
- Preceded by: Gabriel Bengtsson Oxenstierna
- In office 1648–1654
- Succeeded by: Gustav Evertsson Horn

Personal details
- Born: 18 February 1602 Rydboholm Castle, Uppland, Sweden
- Died: 12 September 1680 (aged 78) Bogesund Palace, Sweden

Count Per Brahe the Younger (18 February 1602 – 12 September 1680) was a Swedish soldier, statesman, and writer. He served as Privy Councillor from 1630, Lord High Steward from 1640, as well as Governor-General of Finland in 1637–1640 and 1648–1654.

Brahe fought in Prussia during the Polish War (1626–1629) and in Germany in 1630. However, his military activity later yielded to his political activity, and he held posts of Privy Councillor and Lord High Steward of Sweden. During the minority of Queen Christina (1632–1644) and after the death of King Charles X in 1660, he was one of the regents of Sweden.

During his time as Governor-General of Finland, he made large administrative reforms, introduced a postal system, improved and developed commerce and agriculture, and promoted education. He was the founder of the Royal Academy of Turku and the town of Raahe (Swedish: Brahestad), along with ten other new towns in Finland.

== Life ==
Brahe was born in Rydboholm Castle (now in Österåker Municipality) in Uppland. He was the son of riksråd Count Abraham Pedersson Brahe of Visingsborg (1569–1630) and Elsa Gyllenstierna of Lundholm, and as such the brother of Margareta Brahe and Nils Brahe, and the cousin of Ebba Brahe. He was the grandson of Per Brahe the Elder (1520–1590), one of Gustavus Vasa's Privy Councillors, created count of Visingsborg by King Eric XIV, known also as the continuator of Peder Svart's chronicle of Gustavus (sometimes the "Chronicles of Per Brahe"), and author of Oeconomia in 1585, a manual for young noblemen. Per Brahe the Younger, after completing his education by several years' travel abroad, became in 1626 chamberlain to Gustavus Adolphus, whose lasting friendship he gained.

He fought with distinction in Prussia during the last three years of the Polish War (1626–1629) and also, as colonel of a regiment of horse, in 1630 in Germany. After the death of Gustavus Adolphus in 1632 his military yielded to his political activity. He had been elected president or Lantmarskalk in the Riksdag of 1629, and in the following year was created a Privy Councillor. In 1635 he conducted negotiations for an armistice with Poland (Treaty of Stuhmsdorf).

In 1637–1640 and again in 1648–1654 he was Governor-General in Finland, to which country he rendered inestimable services by his wise and provident rule. He reformed the whole administration, introduced a postal system, founded ten new towns, improved and developed commerce and agriculture, and very greatly promoted education. In 1640 he opened the Royal Academy of Turku, of which he was the founder, and first chancellor. Still today the expression "Kreivin aikaan", or "at Count's Time" in the Finnish language means "at the correct/good time". The base of his statue in Turku bears the inscription "I was well pleased with the land and the land with me."

After the death of King Charles X in 1660, Brahe, as Lord High Steward, became one of the regents of Sweden for the second time (he had held a similar office during the minority of Queen Christina, 1632–1644), and during the difficult year 1660 he had entire control of both foreign and domestic affairs. He died on 2 September 1680 at his castle Bogesund in Uppland. He also held the castles Visingsborg at Visingsö and Brahehus on the mainland by Gränna, where during his lifetime he had held more than regal pomp.

== Legacy ==
The Finnish town of Raahe (Swedish: Brahestad), which he founded in the year of 1649 in Ostrobothnia, is named after him, as is the asteroid 1680 Per Brahe, discovered by Liisi Oterma at the Turku Observatory in 1942. The official naming citation was published by the Minor Planet Center on 1 April 1980 (M.P.C. 5280). Other Finnish towns he founded with Raahe include Hamina, Jakobstad, Kajaani, Kristinestad, Kuopio and Lappeenranta.

== Gallery ==
Painting by Johan Werner in 1649

Portrait in the Skokloster Castle, 1662

Medallion from 1665 by Johan Rethe

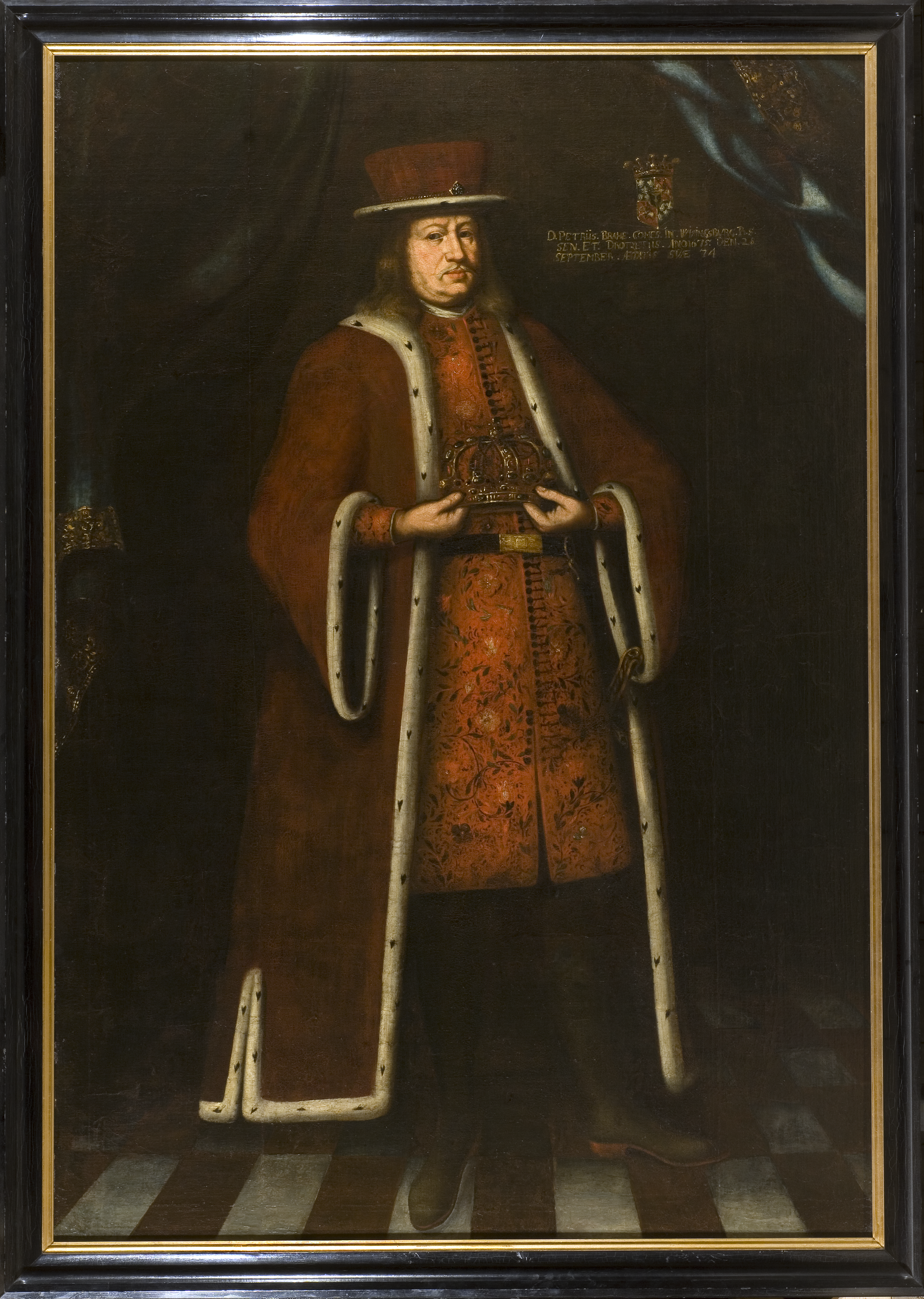
Portrait in the Gripsholm Castle, 1675

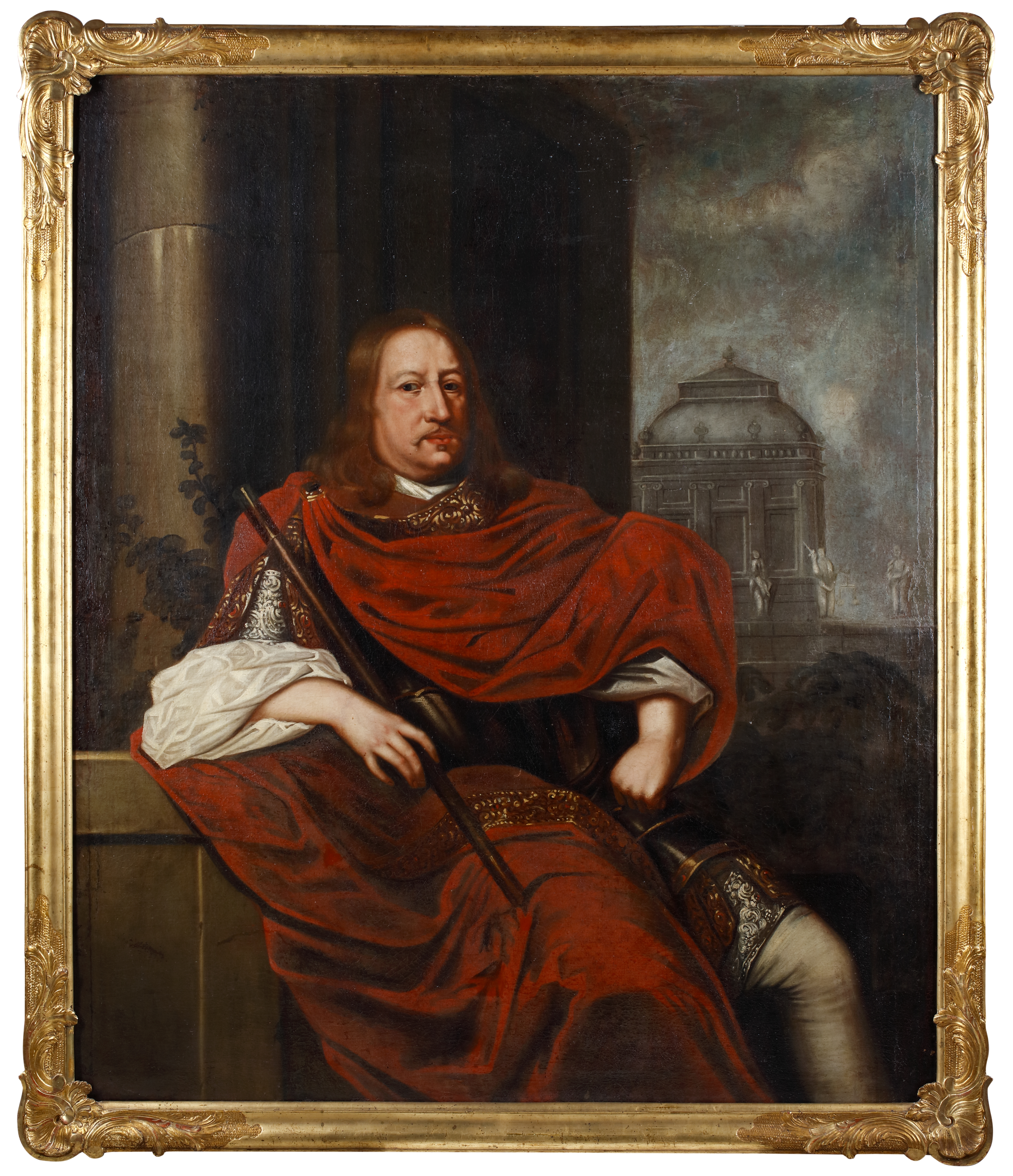
Portrait from 1670 to 1699

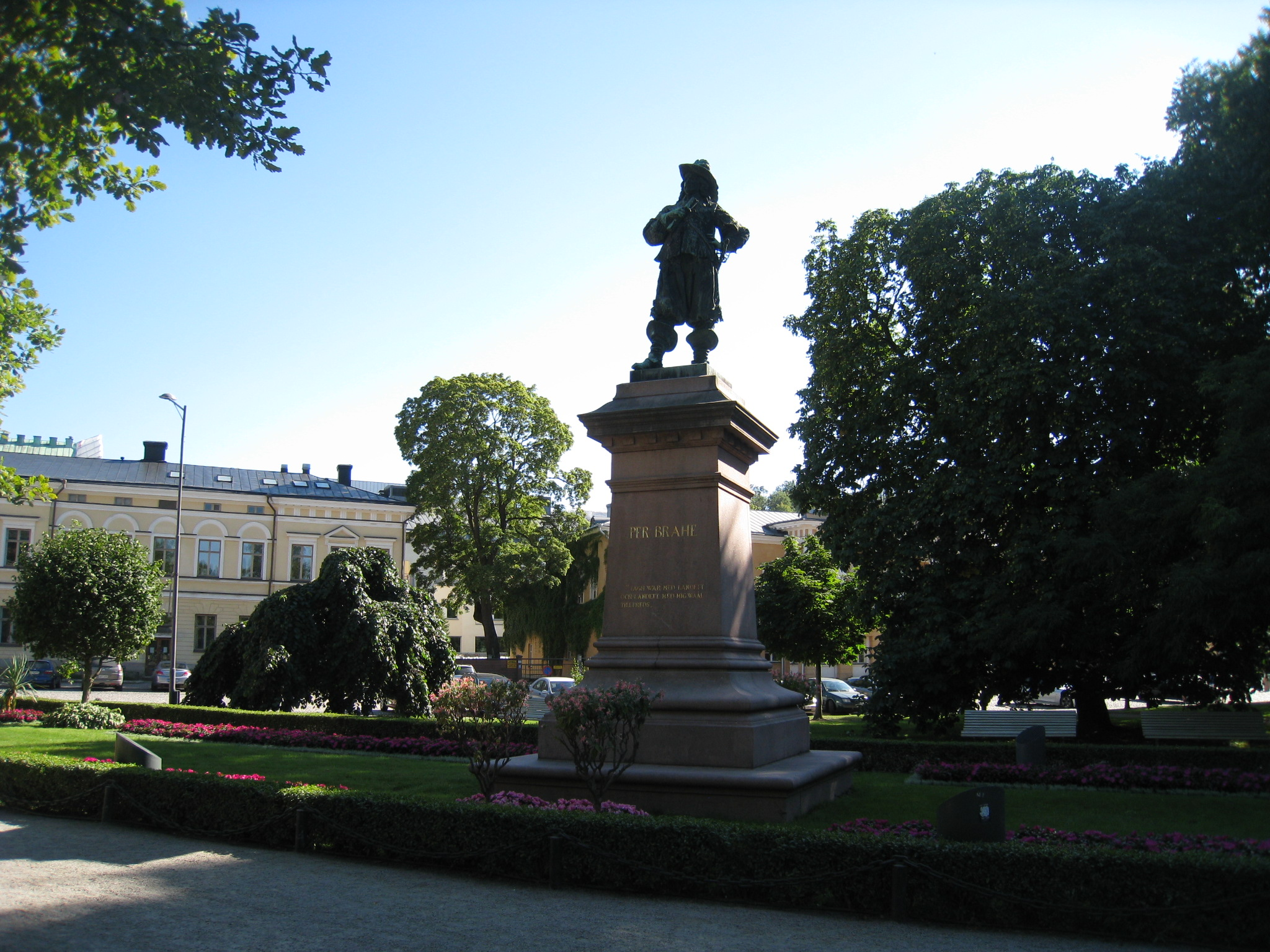
Per Brahe Statue in Turku by Walter Runeberg, 1888

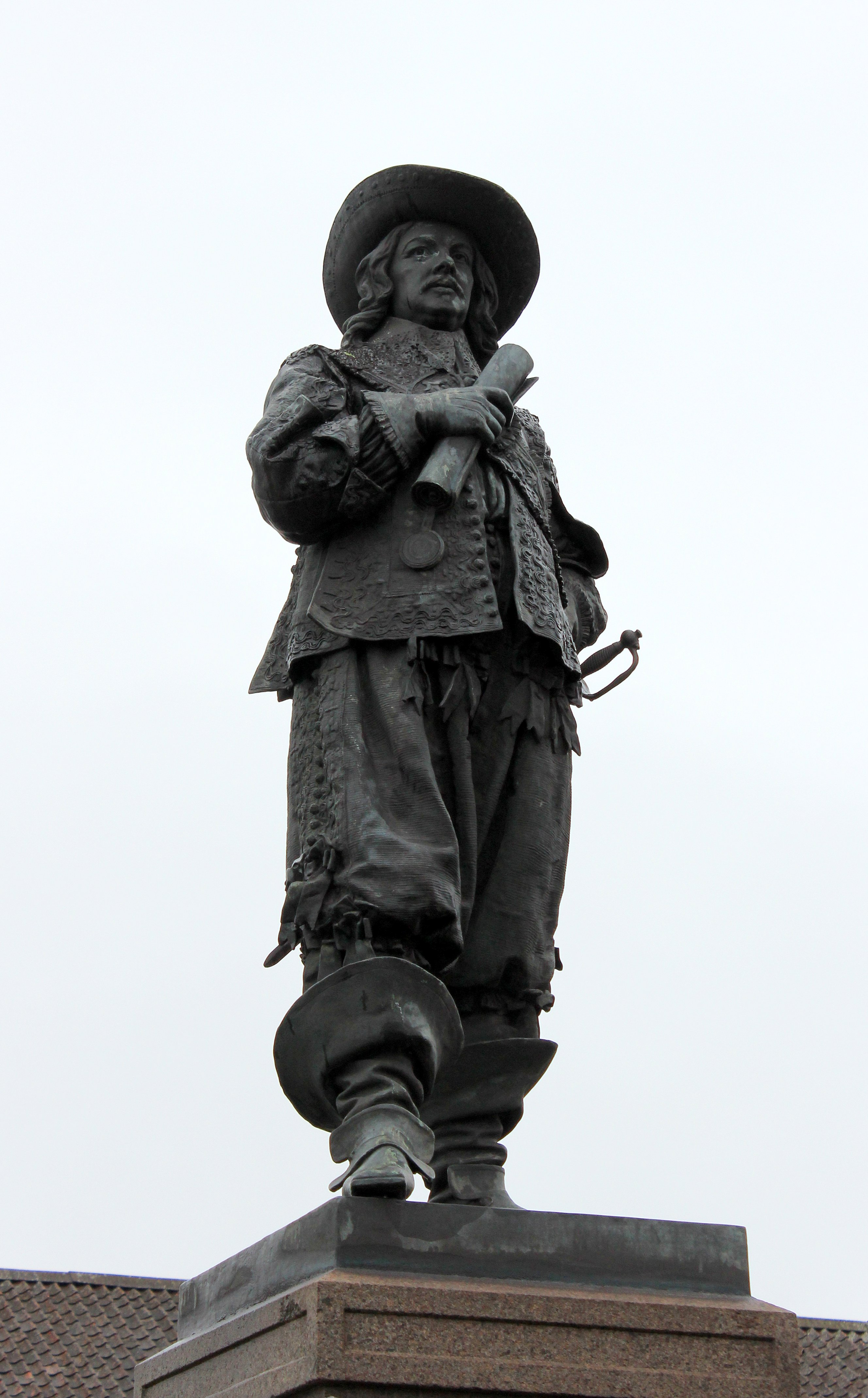
Larger cast of the same statue in Raahe

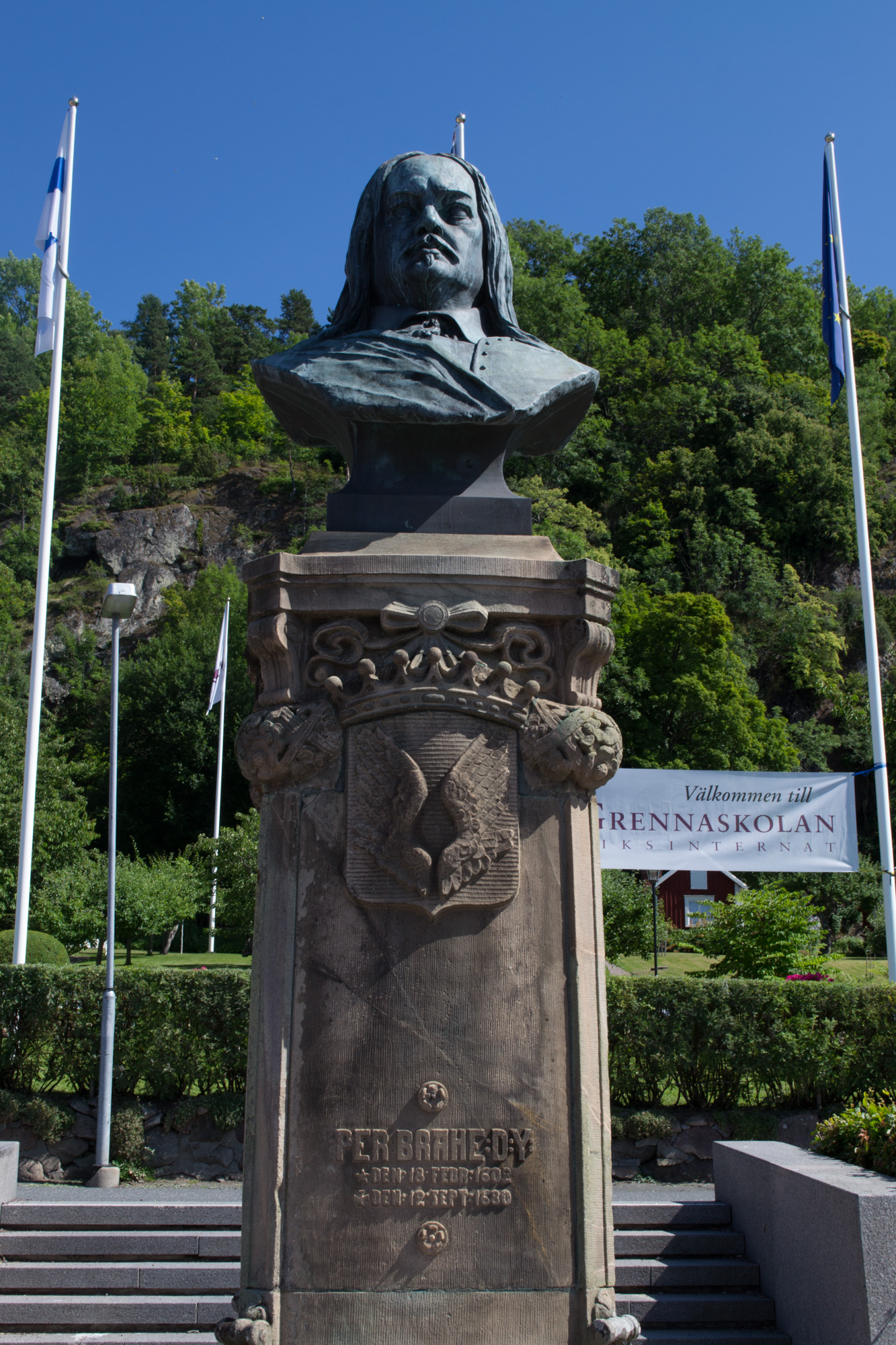
Bust by John Börjeson in Gränna, 1916
Inauguration of the Academy of Turku by Albert Edelfelt
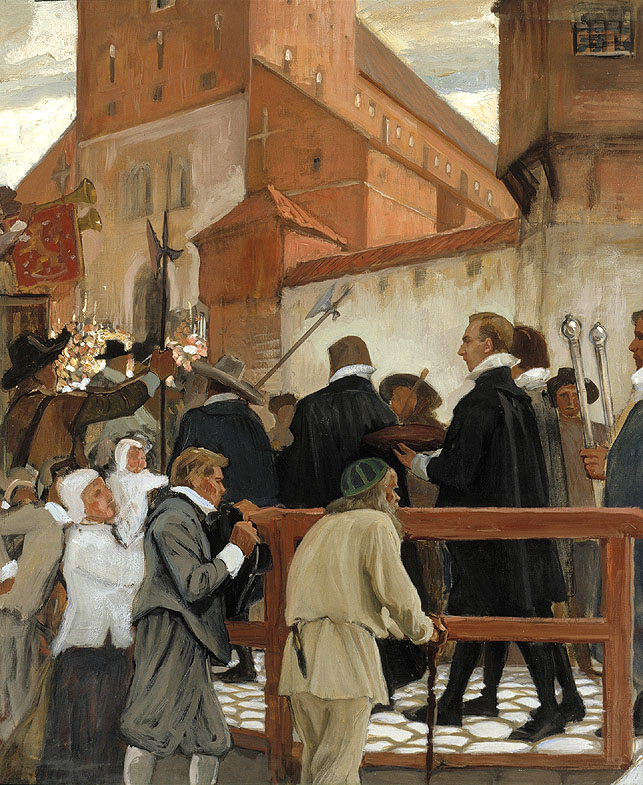
Inauguration of the Academy of Turku Part 1, 1904

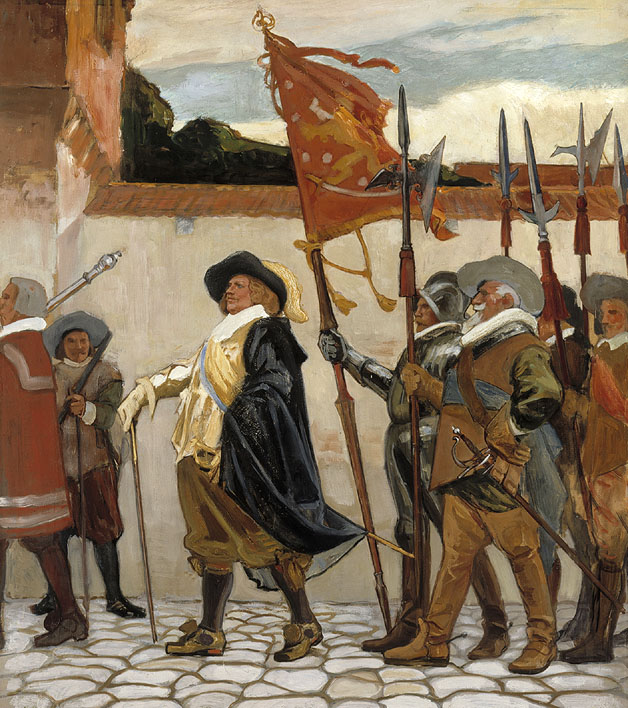
Inauguration of the Academy of Turku Part 2, 1904, with Per Brahe in the middle

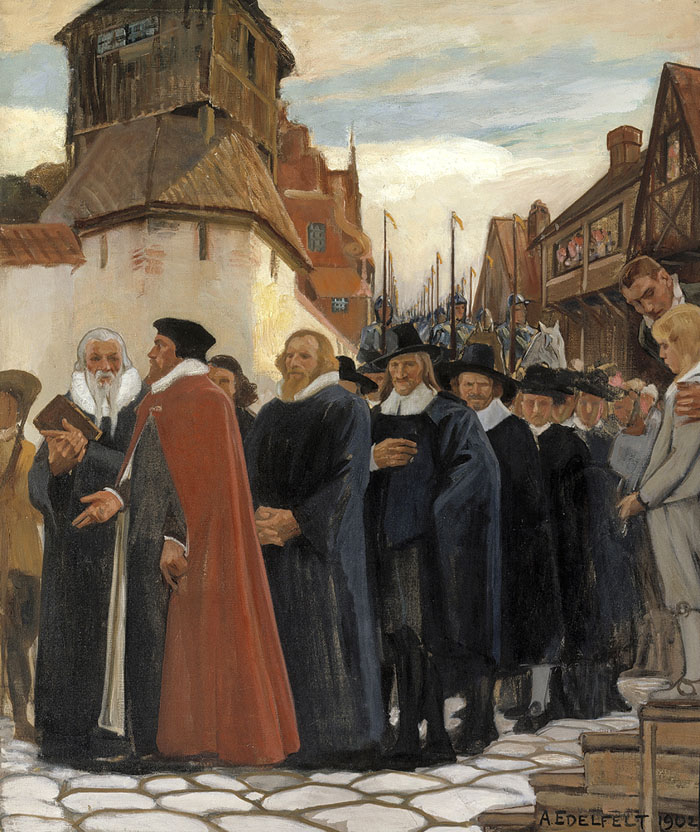
Inauguration of the Academy of Turku Part 3, 1904

== See also ==
- Nils Brahe
- Nils Magnus Brahe

== Sources ==
- Granlund, Lis (2004). "Queen Hedwig Eleonora of Sweden: Dowager, Builder, and Collector". In Campbell Orr, Clarissa (ed.). Queenship in Europe 1660–1815: The Role of the Consort. Cambridge University Press. pp. 56–76. ISBN 0-521-81422-7.

Political offices
Preceded by Gabriel Bengtsson Oxenstierna	Governor-General of Finland; 1637–1641; 1648–1654	Succeeded by Herman Fleming
