= Rydboholm Castle =

Historic structure in Stockholm County, Sweden

Coordinates: 59°26′N 18°11′E

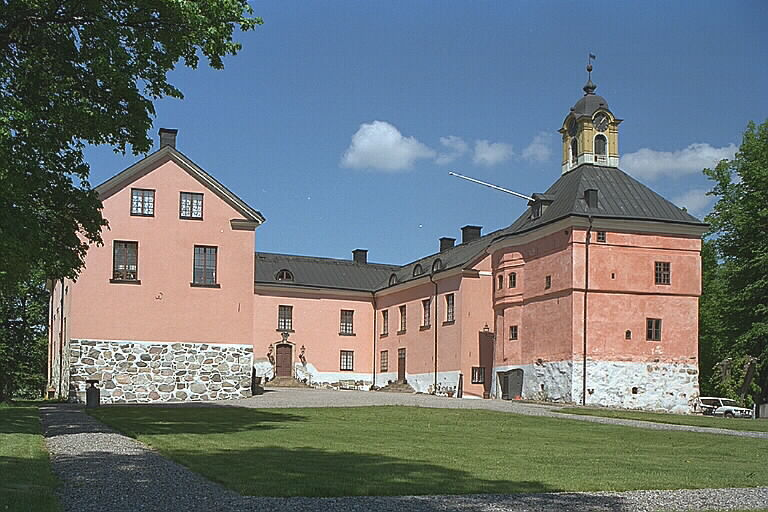
Rydboholm Castle

Rydboholm Castle (Swedish: Rydboholms slott) is a castle located near the village of Rydbo in Österåker Municipality, Stockholm County, Uppland, Sweden.

== Building ==
The castle dates back to the medieval period. The castle, with the three interconnected wings around an open courtyard, dates from the 16th century. The main building was built in 1548. The castle was reconstructed during the 18th century. Southwest of the castle is a large park in English style from the early 19th century, built by Magnus Fredrik Brahe.

== History ==
From the 15th century, Rydboholm was the property of members of the Sture family, followed by the Vasa dynasty. According to some sources Gustav I of Sweden, (1496–1560), who was King of Sweden from 1523 until his death, was born at Rydboholm Castle. From 1520, it belonged to his sister, Margareta Eriksdotter Vasa.

Later it was owned by the Brahe family. The last count Brahe left it to his nephew, baron von Essen. Through marriage ownership passed to the late count Gustaf Douglas and his wife Elisabeth von Essen.

== Sources ==
- Eriksson, Ake (1981) Nordost, illustrerad förortshistoria (Marieberg) ISBN 978-91-7588-092-1 Swedish
