= Anna Vasa of Sweden =

Swedish princess (1568–1625)

Anna of Sweden
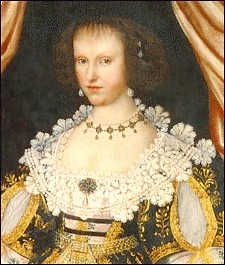
- Anna Princess of Sweden
- Born: 17 May 1568; Eskilstuna, Sweden
- Died: 26 February 1625 (aged 56); Brodnica, Poland
- Burial: Church of St. Mary, Toruń, Poland
- House: Vasa
- Father: John III of Sweden
- Mother: Catherine Jagellon
- Religion: Lutheranism

Anna Vasa of Sweden (also Anne, Polish: Anna Wazówna; 17 May 1568 – 26 February 1625) was a Swedish princess heavily involved in the politics of that country and of Poland. She was starosta of Brodnica and Golub. The youngest child of King John III of Sweden and Catherine Jagiellon, she was close to her brother Sigismund Vasa, King of Poland, Grand Duke of Lithuania (1587–1632) and King of Sweden (1592–1599). Raised a Catholic, Anna converted to Lutheranism in 1584. Though she had several suitors, she remained unmarried.

== Biography ==
=== Early life ===
Anna was the youngest child of Duke John of Finland and Catherine Jagiellon, sister of King Sigismund III Vasa of Poland. She was born at Eskilstunahus just after her family was released from captivity at Gripsholm Castle. Her father ascended in 1569 to the throne of Sweden as John III. Like her brother Sigismund, Anna was raised a Catholic by her mother and attended Catholic mass.

Several marriages were suggested. In 1577, there had been discussions to arrange the marriage between Anna and an Austrian Archduke, either Matthias or Maximilian II, but this became impossible after her conversion a year after her mother's death. When her Catholic aunt Princess Cecilia of Sweden suggested a Catholic royal match for her in 1585, John III replied that Anna had converted to Lutheranism the year before. According to the tradition, the conversion was inspired by the events at the deathbed of her mother in 1583: her mother, who feared purgatory, was comforted by her Jesuit confessor who assured her that purgatory did not exist and was merely used to warn common and simple-minded people. The queen sent the Jesuit away, but it made Anna feel distaste for the falseness of Roman Catholicism.

After the death of her mother, her maternal aunt Queen Anna Jagiellon suggested that she be sent to Poland to be raised there, but was turned down by John III. She had her own court, supervised by her mother's former Mistress of the Robes, Karin Gyllenstierna; one of her maids-of-honours being her cousin, Princess Sigrid of Sweden.

=== Move to Poland ===
In 1587, her brother, Sigismund, was elected King of Poland and Grand Duke of Lithuania as Sigismund III. Her aunt Anna Jagiellon repeated her offer to have Anna with her in Poland and this time John III gave his consent for the sake of Sigismund: "So that the time now in the beginning would not be too long for your dear lord brother". Anna left with Sigismund for Poland 12 September 1587 and was present at his coronation. During her stay at the Polish court, she attracted negative attention by celebrating Lutheran masses with her court.

In 1589, Anna accompanied Sigismund to the meeting with their father in Reval, Swedish Estonia. She was present during the stormy sessions of Riksråd where King John insisted that Sigismund abdicate the Polish throne and come back to Sweden. Swedish councilors protested the idea and furious John promised to persecute them. Erik Sparre asked Anna to intercede as mediator and calm her father. While Sigismund returned to Poland, Anna followed her father back to Sweden, where she spent the following three years.

In 1592, Anna returned to Poland to attend the wedding between her brother and Anna of Austria. She was disliked at the Polish court because of her religion and the influence she had over Sigismund and was suspected of having supported her father's failed plan to arrange a Protestant marriage for Sigismund with Christina of Holstein-Gottorp. The Archbishop was so provoked by her Lutheran services that he threatened both Anna and Sigismund with excommunication. Her sister-in-law Anna of Austria, however, prevented any persecution. In July 1593, she carried her new niece Anna Maria at her baptismal.

Cardinal Andrew Báthory proposed a marriage for her with the Prince of Transylvania. However Anna became engaged to marry her father's first cousin Count Gustaf Brahe (1558-1615), son of Per Brahe the Elder and a future general in Poland. They were raised together at court and were reportedly mutually in love with each other, and there were rumors that they met each other in secret in the home of Brahe's sister Ebba Sparre. In 1587, Gustaf Brahe followed Sigismund and Anna to Poland when Sigismund was elected king there. In 1589, he formally asked Sigismund for Anna's hand, and while he was not given a clear answer, he was not refused, which made him hope that he might be accepted. The potential marriage between princess Anna and Gustaf Brahe was fiercely opposed by Duke Charles, who viewed it as a plot of Gustav Brahe to make princess Anna ruling queen regnant of Sweden while her only brother Sigismund was absent in Poland, and he therefore used their relationship in his libelous chronicle Karlskrönikan. Although it was not the most desirable marriage proposed, Anna declined all other suitors. As time passed, nothing came of her intended marriage, and both Anna and Brahe remained unmarried. A definite explanation of this has not been found in historical sources, but Gustaf Brahe remained at the side of Sigismund and Anna all his life and ultimately followed them to Poland when they left Sweden for good.

=== Her brother's Swedish reign ===
In November 1592, her brother Sigismund succeeded to the throne of Sweden at the death of their father. In September 1593, Anna returned to Sweden in the company of her brother King Sigismund and her sister-in-law Queen Anna. She was regarded with distrust by the Papal envoy Germanico Malaspina. During the scandalous riot between Catholics and Protestants during the burial service of her Polish musician Sowka in Riddarholmskyrkan in November 1593, her own priest, Olaus Simonis, participated on the Protestant side. Anna herself visited her uncle Charles, Duke of Södermanland, in Uppsala in February 1594, and attended the anti-Catholic sermon of Ericus Schepperus. Sigismund had plans to make Anna his regent in Sweden during his stay in Poland. This plan, however, was opposed by Duke Charles, who managed to have the Swedish Council to appoint himself.

In 1594, Sigismund returned to Poland, while Anna remained in Sweden. Papal envoy Malaspina had convinced him to leave her behind because of her involvement in the religious riot in Riddarholmskyrkan and reminded him about the Archbishop's threat of excommunication. Anna was given an allowance with Stegeborg Castle as residence of her own court with the fiefs of Hammarkind, Björkekind, Östkind and Lösing härad. At Stegeborg, she cultivated her interests for herbal medicine. In 1595, Anna arranged for the love marriage between her maid of honour Sigrid Brahe and Johan Gyllenstierna. This became a great scandal as Brahe was engaged to another by her family. Duke Charles refused to mediate and Anna she finally managed to create a settlement between the families at the Söderköping Riksdag of 1595. The wedding also caused a temporary estrangement in the relationship between Anna and Gustaf Brahe, but they soon reconciled.

The Sparre Affair was to be the final break between Anna and Duke Charles. Count Erik Larsson Sparre was a staunch supporter of Sigismund, and Anna kept a box for his wife, Ebba Sparre, sister of her head lady in waiting Margareta Brahe (1559–1638), at Stegeborg, which Duke Charles suspected of containing suspicious documents. When Anna left Stegeborg to attend the death bed of queen dowager Gunilla Bielke in 1597, Duke Charles had her household searched, the box of Ebba Sparre and the correspondence between Anna and the Sparre couple confiscated, and subjected Ebba Sparre as well as her sister Anna's senior lady in waiting Margareta Brahe to an interrogation regarding the Cryptography he found in Anna's papers, and accused Ebba Sparre of having smuggled in her brother, Anna's alleged lover Gustav Brahe to her.

From 1592, Sigismund negotiated a marriage between Anna and Margrave John George of Brandenburg but political tensions kept delaying the agreement. In February 1598, Sigismund demanded that Charles allow Anna to return to Poland as her wedding to John George was finally set to Easter that year. Charles attempted to prevent her departure by demanding an inventory of her Swedish property and the promise that it would be confiscated by the state should she die unmarried. Anna protested, advised Charles to cooperate with Sigismund and offered herself as a mediator. At the return of Sigismund to Sweden, Anna immediately joined him in the civil war that erupted between Sigismund and Charles. She was given the task to mediate, but because of Charles' lack of confidence in her, she was not able to achieve much. After Sigismund's defeat at the Battle of Stångebro in 1598, she left Sweden to live with him in Poland.

=== Later life in Poland ===
After 1598, Anna spent the rest of her life in Poland, though she always referred to herself as a Princess of Sweden. Known as Anna of Svecia (Anna of Sweden), she was a Protestant member of a Catholic royal family, and acted as a protector of the exiled Protestant Swedish loyalists of Sigismund and Polish Protestants. Princess Anna maintained a good relationship with and influence upon Sigismund, and she functioned as his political adviser on the affairs of state, something which made her a controversial figure in Poland.

During the captivity of Carl Gyllenhielm, an illegitimate son of Duke Charles, in Poland in 1610–13, she gave him much attention. She was given the task of interrogating Gyllenhielm by Sigismund, who listened hidden by a curtain. She accused Charles of conspiracy to entice conflict between Sigismund and John III, something Gyllenhielm denied.

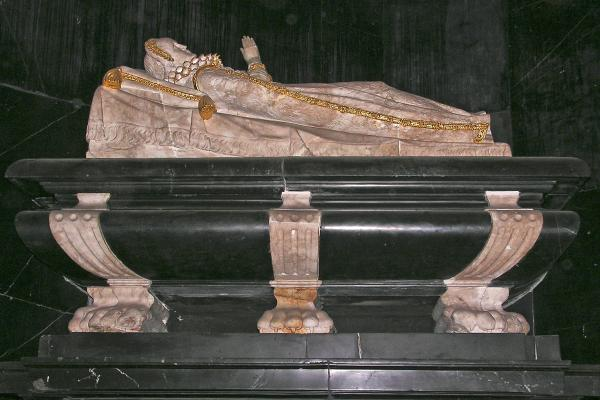
Princess Anne's grave in Toruń

Anna remained unmarried. In 1602, duke Charles de Gonzaga-Nevers suggested a marriage to a French prince, which was never realized. The negotiations with Johann Georg von Brandenburg were finally discontinued in 1609. The rumors that she had a love relationship with the exiled Swedish count Gustaf Brahe, a supporter of Sigismund, have never been confirmed, but it was used by Charles IX, who feared her political influence and in a letter to Sigismund from 1607 referred to her as: "Your poisonous sister, the creator of all evil and born to the destruction of all lands and the Kingdom". Charles IX once feared that she would marry Tsar Dmitrij of Russia, which was however a false rumor.

Sigismund made Anna starosta of Brodnica in 1605 and Golub in 1611. She divided her time between her fief and the court of her brother. Anna's appanage was Strasburg (now Brodnica), a Royal Prussian district in Poland near the Baltic, where she lived in Golub and Strasburg. She became very respected because of her great learning. She was interested in literature, music, gardening and medicine. She was a specialist in medicinal herbs and kept her own apothecary. With the help of an Italian assistant, she made her own experiments in herbal medicine. She financed the herbarium of Simon Syrenius.

Anna was buried at the Church of St. Mary in Toruń, Poland several years after her death, as the Pope had first forbidden the burial of a Protestant in a blessed graveyard in Catholic Poland. Her nephew, king Władysław IV Vasa, got that decree reversed. He built a beautiful black Dębnik marble tomb monument with a white alabaster figure of his beloved aunt.

== Gallery ==
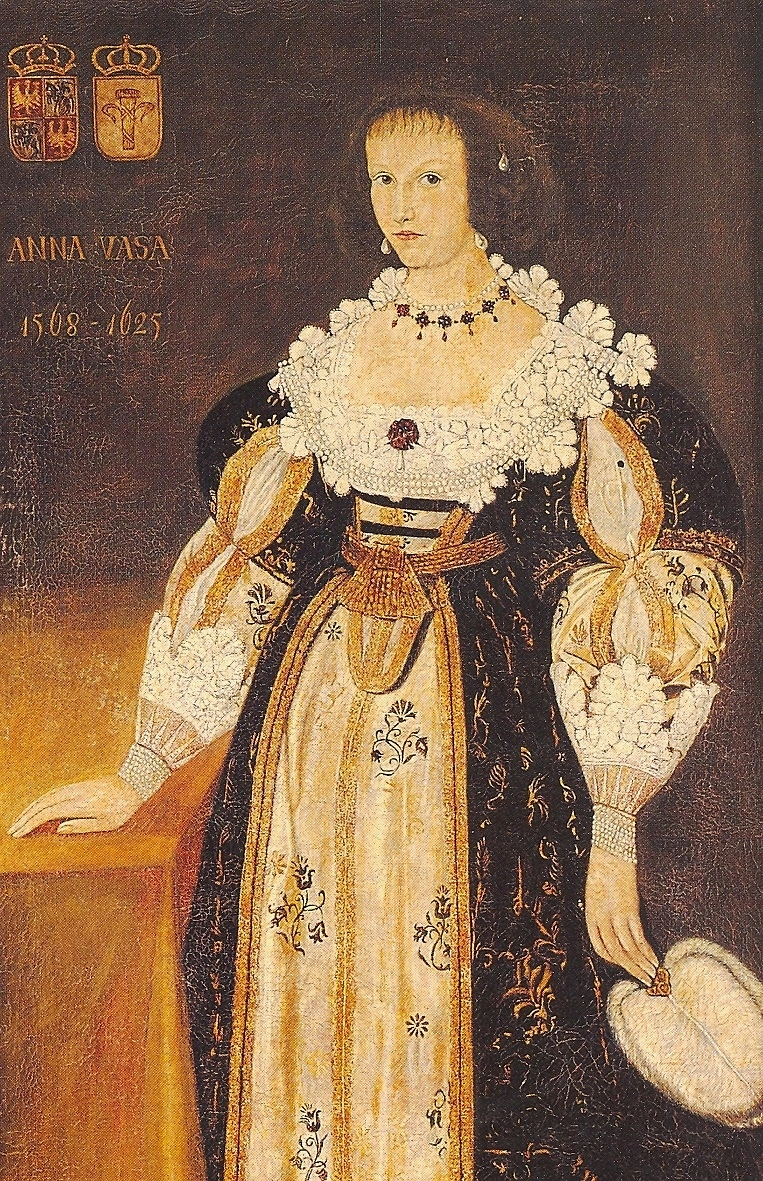
Anna by Elbfas (unidentified by Nationalmuseum but accepted by academic writers)

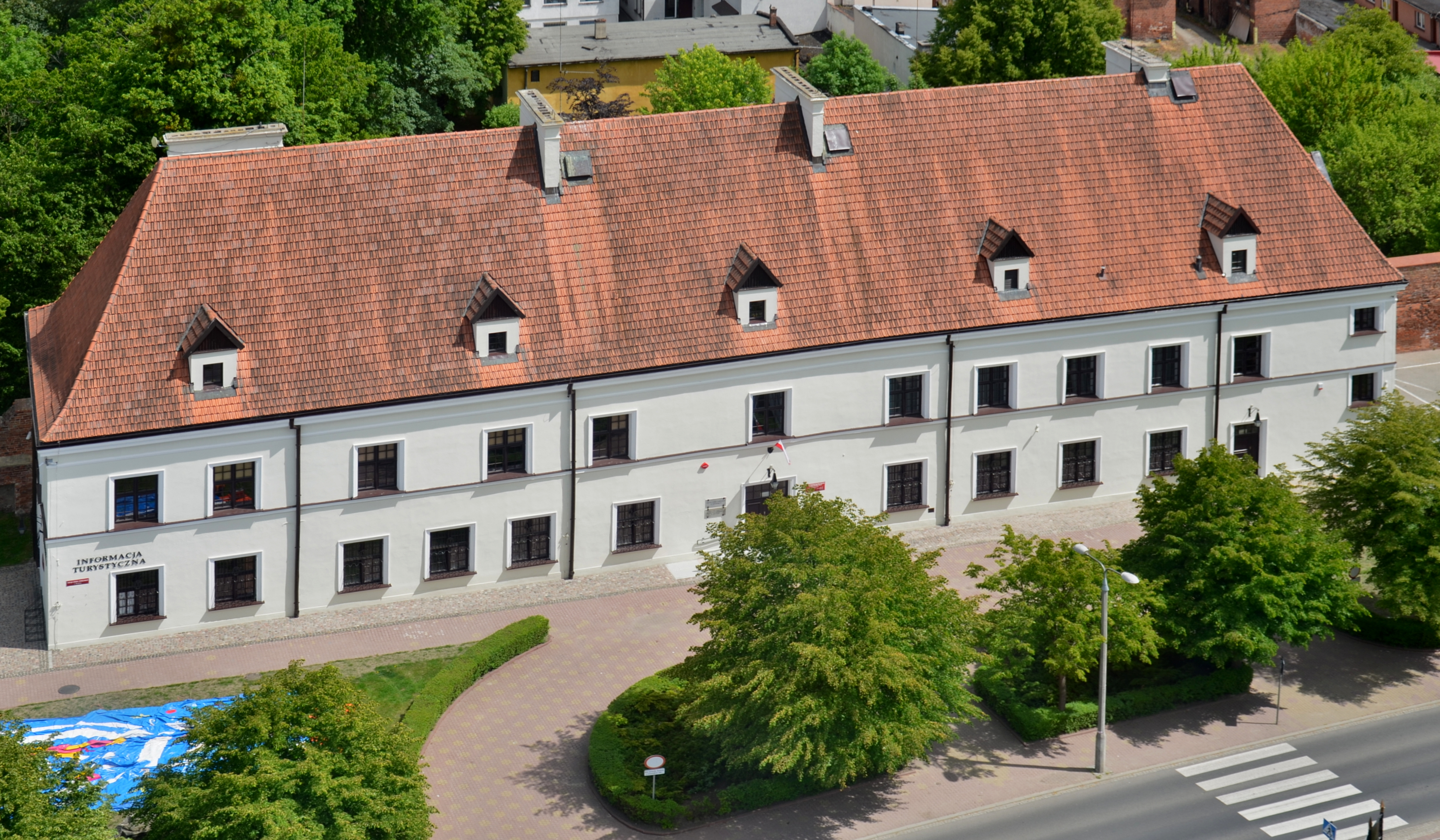
Palace of Anna Vasa in Brodnica, where she resided.

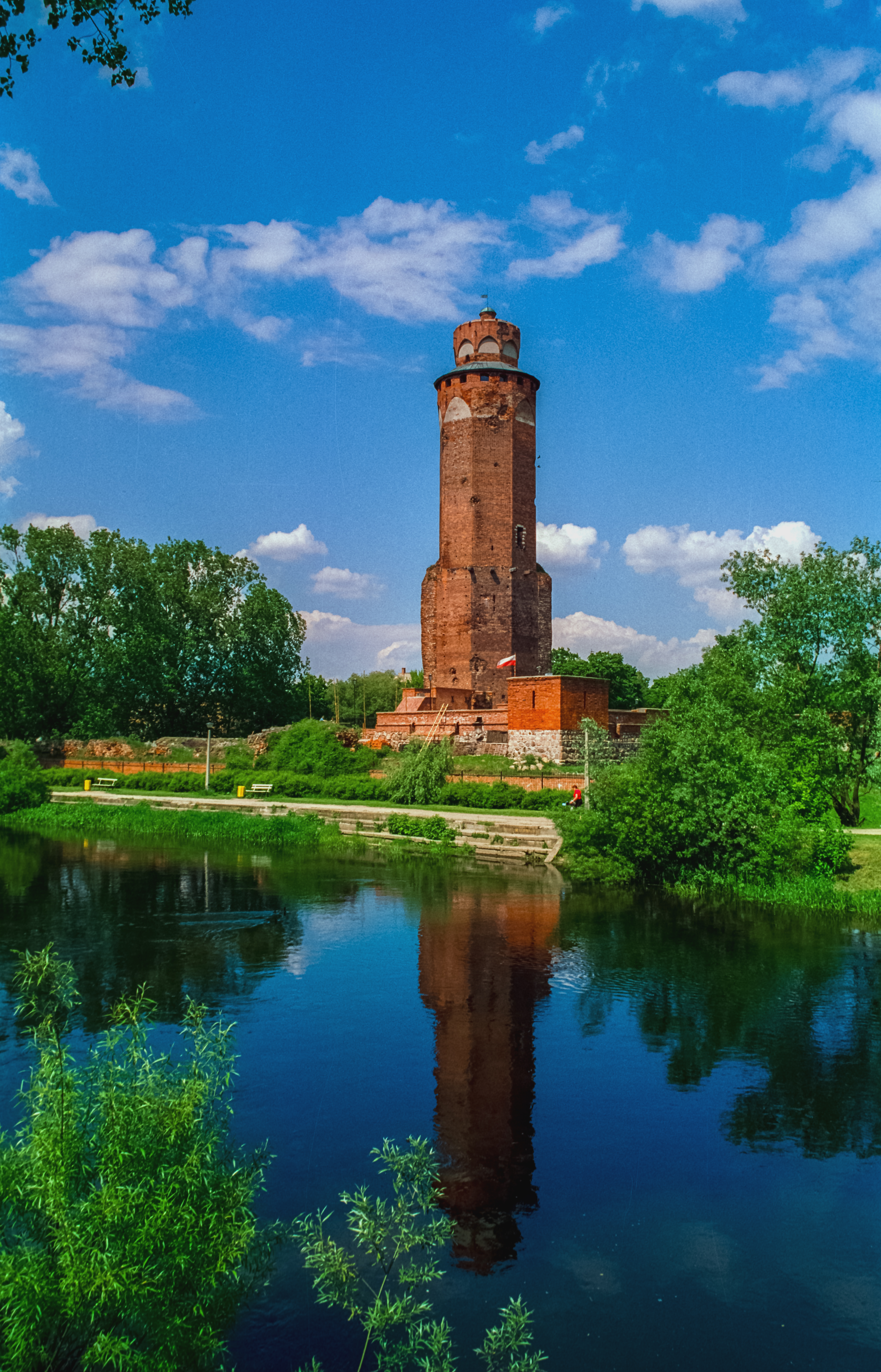
Tower of the Castle in Brodnica, where she resided. The castle was pulled down in 1785 by the Prussians.

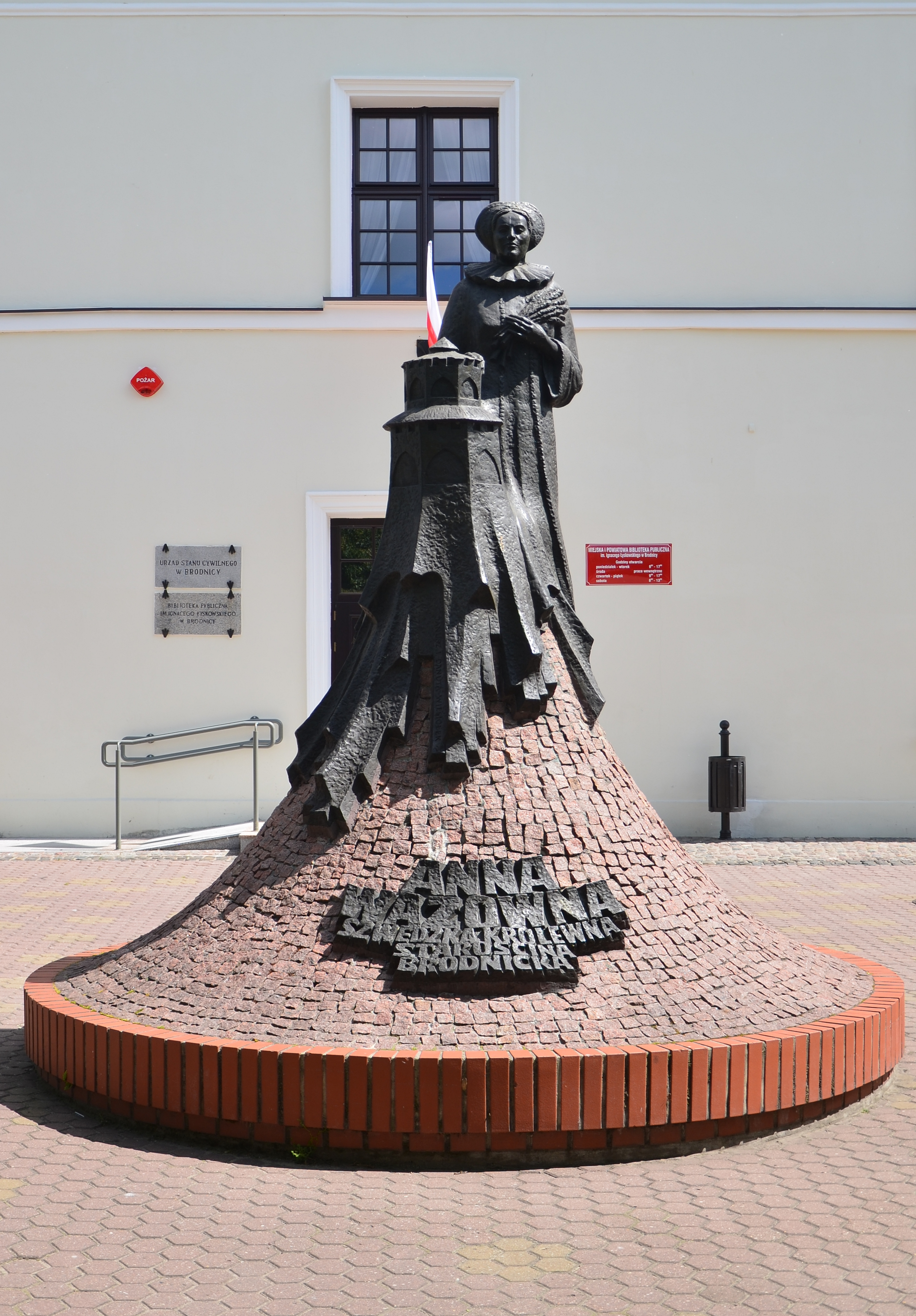
Monument to Anna in Brodnica

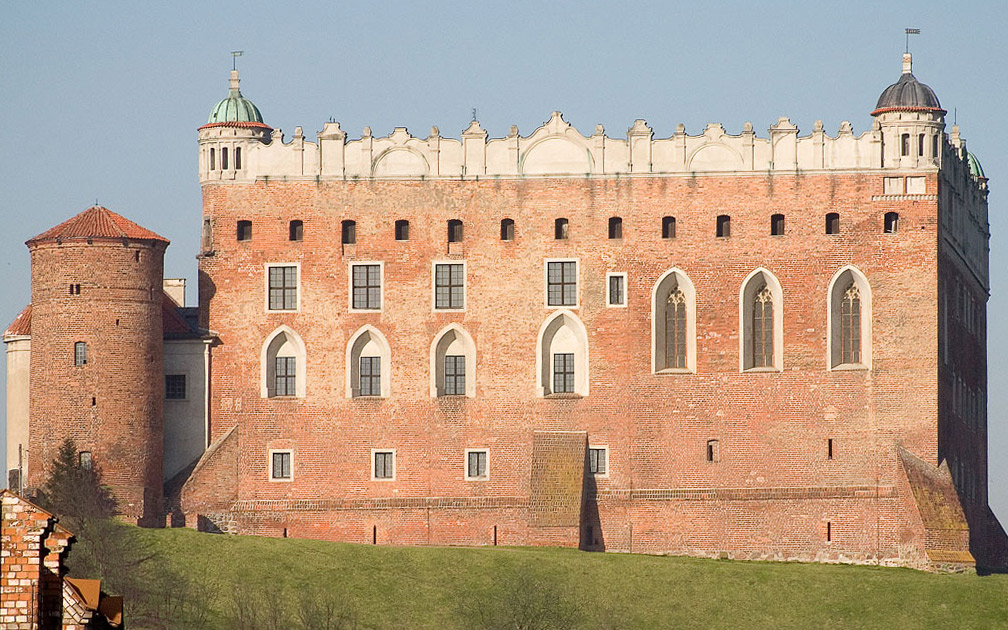
Castle in Golub-Dobrzyń, her residence between 1616 and 1623, which she embellished with an attic.

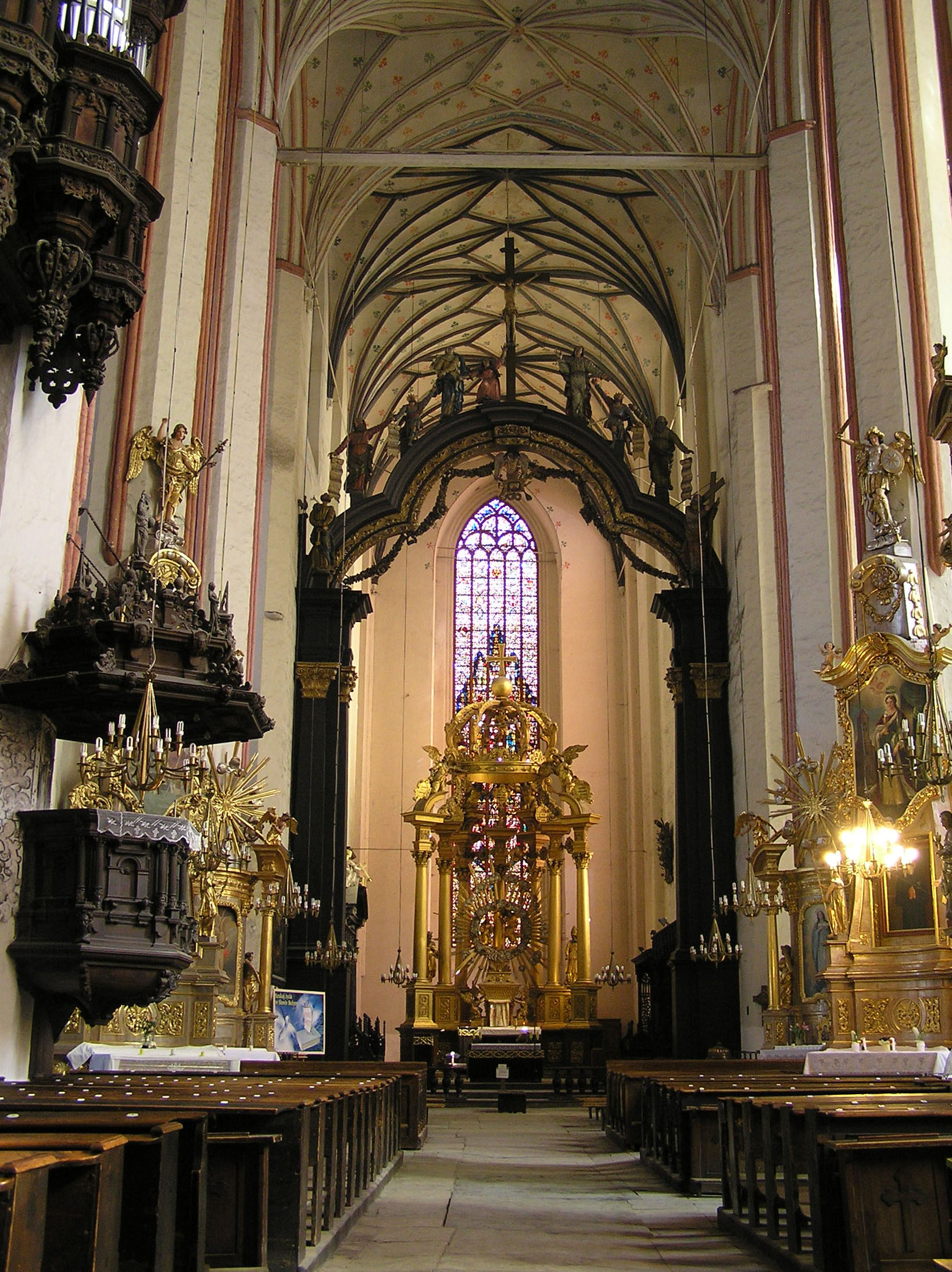
Nave of the Church of Assumption of the Blessed Virgin Mary in Toruń, where she was buried.

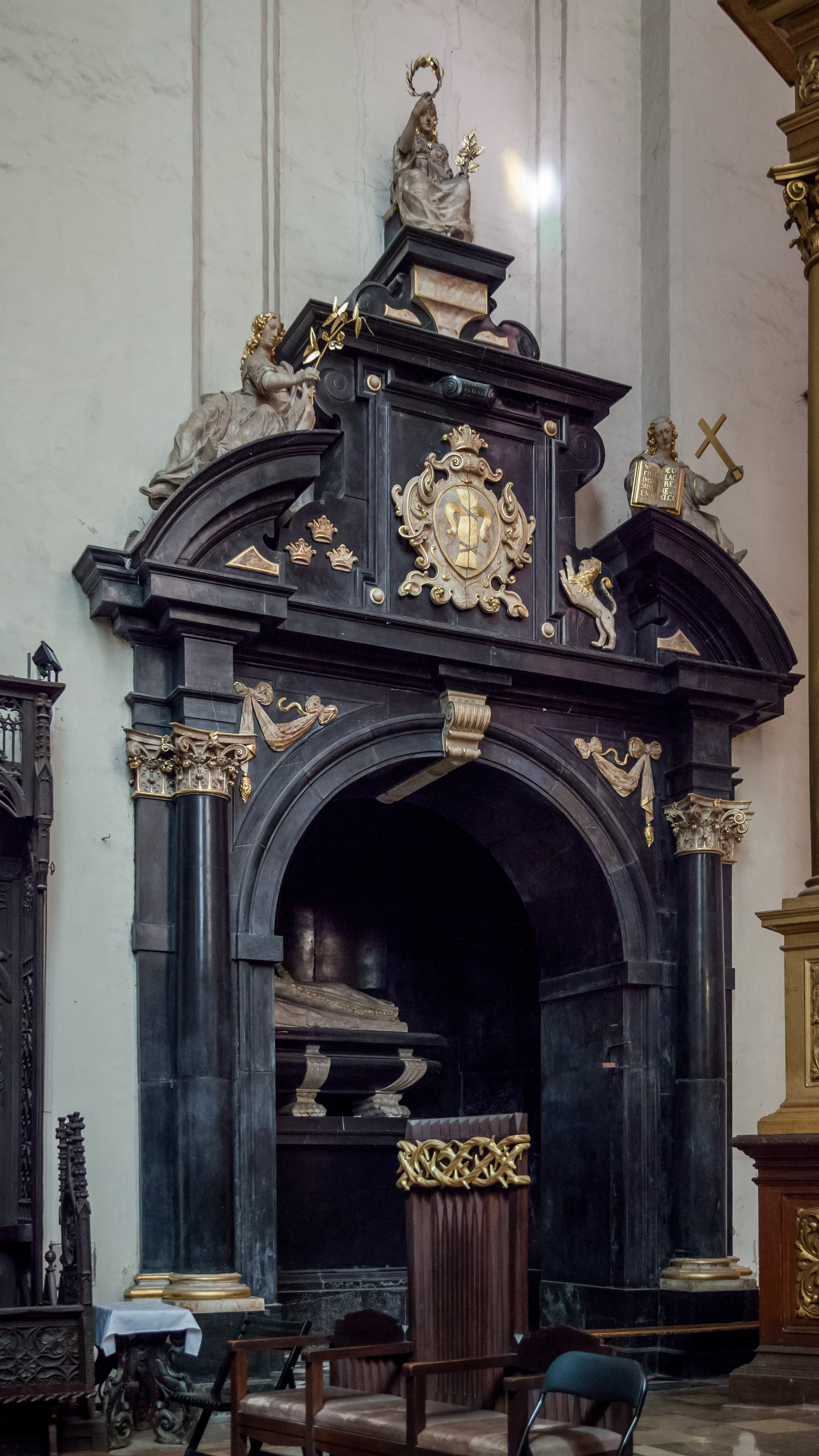
Portal to Anna Vasa's mausoleum in the Church of Assumption of the Blessed Virgin Mary in Toruń.

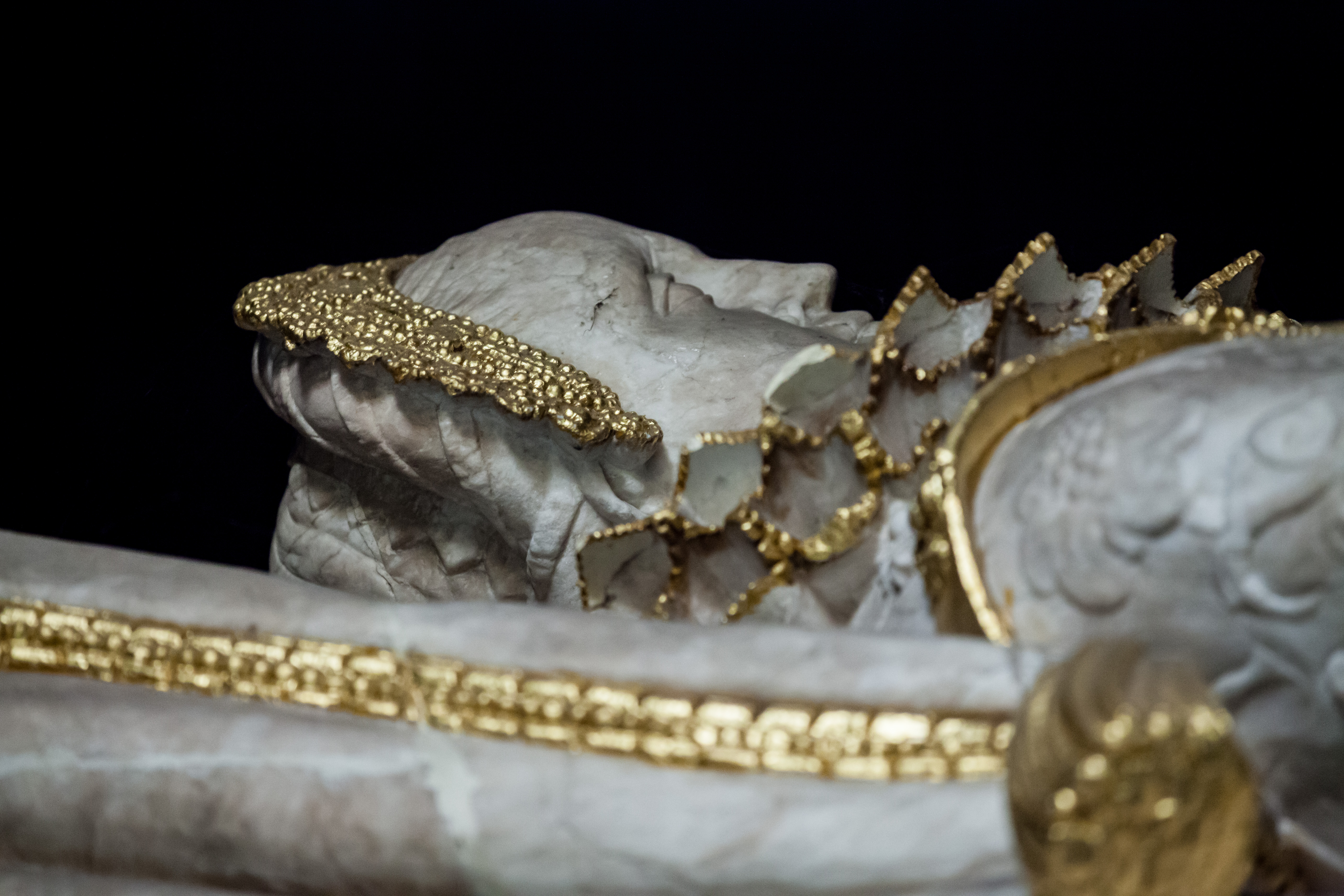
Effigy of Anna Vasa from her mausoleum
