= Great Officers of the Realm =

The Great Officers of the Realm (Swedish: de högre riksämbetsmännen) were the five leading members of the Swedish Privy Council from the later parts of the 16th century to around 1680. With the constitution of 1634, the five officers became heads of five different branches of government (kollegium). The same constitution also declared that the great officers were to act as regents during the minorities of kings or regnal queens. All great officers of the realm were abolished by king Charles XI of Sweden. The Lord High Steward and the Lord High Chancellor offices were revived in the late 18th century, but were soon removed again.

== The five great officers ==
The great officers were, in order of a ranking which was established in 1634, the following:

1. Lord High Steward (or Lord High Justiciar (riksdrots))
2. Lord High Constable (riksmarsk)
3. Lord High Admiral (riksamiral)
4. Lord High Chancellor (rikskansler)
5. Lord High Treasurer (riksskattmästare)

=== Lord High Steward ===
The title meant no particular assignment until 1614, when Lord High Steward Magnus Brahe was put in charge of the newly established Svea Court of Appeal, the highest court of Sweden at the time. The steward became responsible of supervising justice in Sweden.

=== Lord High Constable ===
The title meant no particular assignment until 1630, when Lord High Constable Jacob De la Gardie became president of the Council of War (first Krigsrätten, later Krigsrådet and, from 1634, the War College). As such he was chief of the army.

=== Lord High Admiral ===
The Lord High Admiral was head of the Admiralty of Sweden (Amiralitetskollegium from 1634) and the Swedish navy.

=== Lord High Chancellor ===
The Lord High Chancellor was assigned to ensure that the orders of the king and government were followed. Along the way, the assignments of the chancellor increased to the amount that a chancellery, the Privy Council Chancellery, had to be established. The chancellery became one of the governmental branches and the chancellor acted as head of it. Albeit fourth in rank among the great officers, the Lord High Chancellor became the most important figure in the Privy Council. The chancellor was head of the relations with foreign powers.

=== Lord High Treasurer ===
The Lord High Treasurer had the responsibility to supervise issues concerning the economy of the state. The office holder was head of the Chambers, which in 1634 was declared one of five departments of the government under the name Kammarkollegiet.

== Lesser Officers of the Realm ==
Below the great officers in rank, were a number of Lesser Officers of the Realm (Swedish: de lägre riksämbetsmännen). These were Marshal of the Realm (riksmarskalk), Equerry of the Realm (riksstallmästare), Forester of the Realm (riksjägmästaren), Quartermaster General (generalkvartermästare) and Master of Ordnance of the Realm (rikstygmästare).

In the late 17th century, king Charles XI removed not only the great officers but the smaller officers as well. The Marshal of the Realm and the Equerry of the Realm offices were both revived by king Gustav III in the late 18th century. Among both the greater and smaller officers, the only title to exist in present-day Sweden, is the Marshal of the Realm.

== See also ==
- History of Sweden
- List of Swedish monarchs
- Privy Council of Sweden
