= Margareta Brahe (1559–1638) =

Swedish courtier (1559–1638)

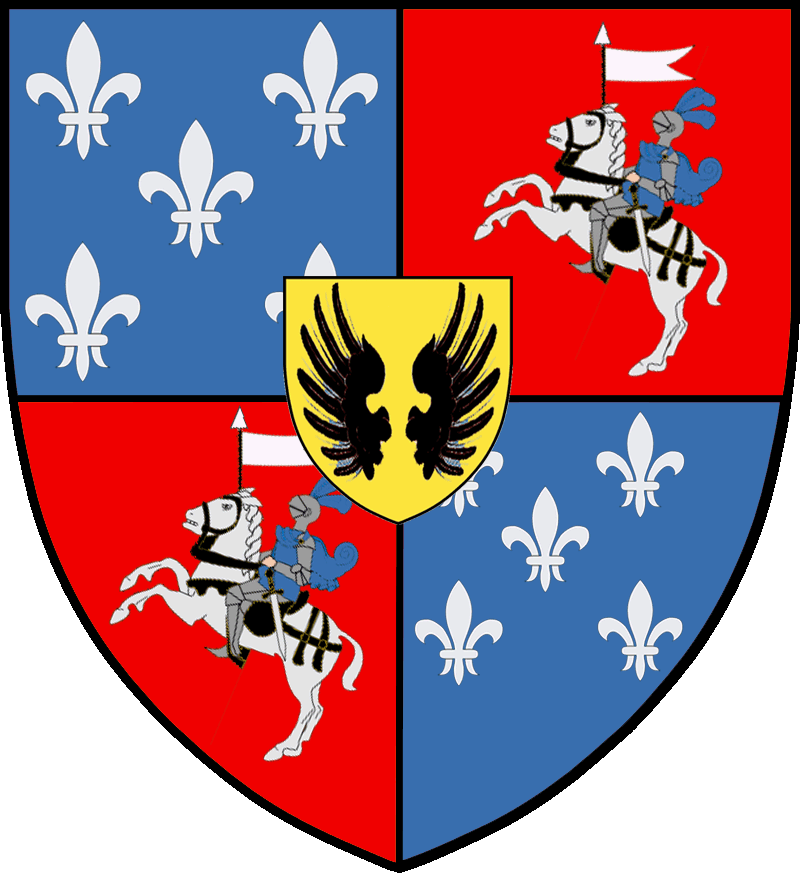

Margareta Brahe (2 July 1559 – 26 April 1638) was a Swedish courtier; hovmästarinna (Mistress of the Robes) to princess Anna Vasa of Sweden, from 1591.

Born to count Per Brahe the Elder and Beata Stenbock and niece of queen dowager Catherine Stenbock, she married noble Johan Larsson Sparre in 1587. She was the sister of Gustaf Brahe, who was rumored to be the lover of princess Anna, as well as Erik Brahe (1552–1614), Magnus Brahe (1564–1633), Sigrid Brahe and Abraham Brahe (1569–1630).

In 1591, she was appointed head lady in waiting to princess Anna and her spouse to chamberlain of Anna's court. They accompanied Anna to Poland when she left to join her brother Sigismund III Vasa in 1592. Princess Anna returned to Sweden with her court the following year and settled with her court at Stegeborg Castle. In 1595, Anna arranged the scandalous Wednesday Wedding between Margareta's sister Sigrid Brahe and Johan Nilsson Gyllenstierna.

Princess Anna and her uncle Duke Charles were involved in several conflicts. The Sparre Affair was to be the final break between Anna and Duke Charles, and it involved also Margareta Brahe and her family. Her brother-in-law Count Erik Larsson Sparre was a staunch supporter of Sigismund, and Anna kept a box for his wife, Margareta's sister Ebba Sparre at Stegeborg, which Duke Charles suspected to contain suspicious documents. When Anna left Stegeborg to attend the deathbed of Queen Dowager Gunilla Bielke in 1597, Duke Charles had her household searched. Ebba Sparre's box and the correspondence between Anna and the Sparre couple was confiscated, and he subjected Ebba Sparre as well as Margareta Brahe to an interrogation regarding the encoded information he found in Anna's papers. He accused Ebba Sparre of having smuggled in their brother, Anna's alleged lover Gustav Brahe to her.

After the Battle of Stångebro during the War against Sigismund in 1598, Princess Anna fled with Sigismund to Poland, while Margareta remained; her spouse having been given command of Kalmar by Sigismund. In May 1599, her spouse and her brother-in-law were executed as followers of Sigismund by Charles IX of Sweden during the Kalmar Bloodbath. Margareta fled to Sigismund and Anna in Poland, where she accused her brothers Erik Brahe (1552–1614) and Magnus Brahe (1564–1633) of complicity in the death verdict of her spouse. She was provided with a pension by Sigismund for her loyalty and settled with her children in Denmark. In 1628, she was given permission to return to Sweden, where she died ten years later. She was the paternal aunt of Margareta Brahe.
