= Lord High Treasurer of Sweden =

The Lord High Treasurer (Swedish: riksskattmästare) was a highly prominent member of the Swedish Privy Council between 1602 and 1684, excluding periods when the office was out of use. The Lord High Treasurer was head of the Kammarkollegiet and, from 1634, one of five Great Officers of the Realm.

== Origin ==
A "Master of the Chamber" (kammarmästare) or chamberlain, with the responsibility to supervise issues concerning the economy of the state, is mentioned as early as the beginning of the 14th century. During Gustav Vasa's time as king (1523–1560), the title was called överste räknemästare as well, and the office holder was head of the chamber (kammaren), which was the first central bureau of Sweden. Later in the 16th century, an överste räknemästare is among the privy councillors. From 1602, the chief of the chamber was named Lord High Treasurer, riksskattmästare.

== The office during the 17th century ==
The chamber was reorganized and renamed Kammarkollegiet during the first decades of the 17th century. It was one of five branches of the government from 1634, and the head of the Kammarkollegium, the Lord High Treasurer, was fifth in rank among the five Great Officers of the Realm. That meant that the office holder was not only one of the most prominent members of the Swedish Privy Council, but also a member of the government ruling the country during the minority of a king or regnal queen.

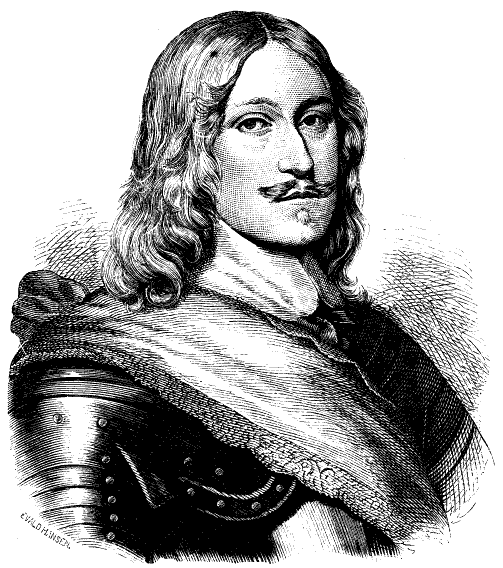
Magnus Gabriel De la Gardie - Lord High Treasurer 1652-1660

The first Lord High Treasurer of Sweden was Seved Ribbing (1602–1613). He was succeeded by Jesper Mattsson Krus, but when Krus left the office in 1622, no new treasurer was appointed until 1634, although Count Palatine John Casimir acted as a de facto Lord High Treasurer without holding that title.

When king Charles X Gustav died in 1660, he wished, through his will, that Herman Fleming would be appointed Lord High Treasurer and as such a member of the quintet ruling Sweden until young king Charles XI would come of age. The nobility opposed this, and ensured that Fleming missed out on the appointment. Instead Gustaf Bonde became the new treasurer.

After the death of Sten Bielke in 1684, king Charles abolished the title. The king, who had come to age in 1672, generally wanted to avoid appointing new holders of the high offices, once these became vacant. The riksskattmästare title has not been used since, in contrast to two other offices that Charles XI abolished, Lord High Chancellor of Sweden and Lord High Steward of Sweden, who were both revived for a relatively short period in the late 18th century. The assignments of the Lord High Treasurer was taken over by the President of the Kammarkollegium.

== Lord High Treasurers of Sweden ==
- Seved Ribbing (1602–1613)
- Jesper Mattsson Krus (1615–1622)
- Gabriel Bengtsson Oxenstierna (1634–1652)
- Magnus Gabriel De la Gardie (1652–1660)
- Gustaf Bonde (1660–1667)
- Seved Bååt (1668–1669)
- Sten Bielke (1672–1684)
