= Magnus Brahe (1564–1633) =

Swedish noble

Count Magnus Brahe

Lord High Constable of Sweden
- In office 1602–1611
- Preceded by: Klas Fleming
- Succeeded by: Axel Nilsson Ryning

Lord High Steward of Sweden
- In office 1611–1633
- Preceded by: Mauritz Stensson Leijonhufvud
- Succeeded by: Gabriel Gustafsson Oxenstierna

Personal details
- Born: 25 September 1564 Tynnelsö Castle, Sweden
- Died: 3 March 1633 (aged 68) Stockholm, Sweden
- Spouse(s): Brita Stensdotter Leijonhufvud; Helena Bielke
- Children: Ebba Brahe

Count Magnus Brahe (1564–1633) was a Swedish noble. Being both Lord High Constable and Lord High Steward of Sweden, he was a notable figure in 17th century Sweden.

== Early life ==
Magnus Brahe, a son of Per Brahe the Elder and Beata Stenbock and nephew of queen dowager Catherine Stenbock, was born at Tynnelsö Castle on 25 September 1564. He was the brother of Erik Brahe (1552–1614), Gustaf Brahe (1558–1615), Margareta Brahe (1559–1638), Sigrid Brahe and Abraham Brahe (1569–1630).

== Career ==
He became a chamberlain of King Sigismund in 1590. Four years later, he left Sigismund and started to support Sigismund's cousin Duke Carl, who was an enemy of Sigismund and challenged the king for the throne. Brahe received various important assignments from Duke Carl, and eventually, in 1602, Brahe became Lord High Constable (Swedish: riksmarsk) and a member of the Swedish Privy Council.

Brahe's older brothers had supported Sigismund which led to them losing the Visingsborg earldom. Having been a trustful supporter of Duke Carl, who became regent of Sweden in 1599 and king 1604, Brahe was declared Count of Visingsborg instead. When King Carl IX died and was succeeded by his son Gustavus Adolphus in 1611, Brahe remained a close confidant of the new king. The same year, he was appointed Lord High Steward (Swedish: riksdrots), becoming arguably the most prominent member of the Privy Council.

In 1614, he was made the first president of Svea Court of Appeal, when this court was created. Brahe was knighted at the coronation of Gustavus Adolphus in October 1617.

== Family life and death ==
Brahe married Countess Brita Stensdotter Leijonhufvud (1567–1611) at Gräfsnäs Palace on 10 November 1594. They were parents of Ebba Brahe (1596–1674), who was the subject of king Gustav Adolphus' love. The countess died in 1611, and Brahe remarried at Strömsholm Palace on 18 October 1618, this time with Baroness Helena Bielke (1592–1651). He died in Stockholm on 3 March 1633 due to an illness, which possibly was caused by the great grief Brahe felt when king Gustavus Adolphus died four months earlier. He was buried on 12 May the same year in Västerås Cathedral.
