= Lesser Officers of the Realm =

During the 17th century in Sweden, the highest officials in the realm were divided into two sections of 5 positions each, they were the Great Officers of The Realm and the Lesser Officers of the Realm. The Lesser Officers of the Realm were directly connected to the Royal Court or one of the branches of the Army.

== List of the Lesser Officers of the Realm ==
The Officers were, in order of precedence:

- Marshal of the Realm (Swedish: Riksmarskalk), the senior court official of the Realm
- Master of the Horse (Swedish: Riksstallmästare), Superintendent of the King's Stables, Stud Farms and of the Cavalry
- Master of the Artillery (Swedish: Riksfälttygmästare), Chief of the Field Artillery Corps
- Master of the Hunt (Swedish: Riksjägmästaren), superintendent of the King's Forests
- Quartermaster general (Swedish: Generalkvartermästare), In charge of army supplies and fortifications.

== See also ==
- History of Sweden
- Privy Council of the Swedish monarch
