= Sigrid Brahe =

Swedish countess

Sigrid Brahe (1568–1608), was a Swedish countess, known for the great scandal Onsdagsbröllopet (The Wednesday Wedding) in 1595.

Sigrid Brahe was the daughter of count Per Brahe the Elder and Beata Stenbock and niece of queen dowager Catherine Stenbock, and sister of Erik Brahe (1552–1614), Gustaf Brahe (1558–1615), Margareta Brahe (1559–1638), Magnus Brahe (1564–1633) and Abraham Brahe (1569–1630). After the death of queen Catherine Jagiellon in 1583, king John III of Sweden had plans to marry her, but gave up the plan in consideration for the opposition of his siblings and instead married Gunilla Bielke in 1585. Instead, her family engaged her to count Erik Bielke af Åkerö upon the wish of the family and queen Gunilla Bielke. The engagement was made against the will of Sigrid Brahe, who was in love with baron Johan Nilsson Gyllenstierna.

When she was made aware of the gossip that her betrothed had been given a venereal disease in Poland, she fled to the court of Princess Anna at Stegeborg Castle and placed herself under the protection. Shortly thereafter, Gyllenstierna arrived at Stegeborg. The same day, the 19 March 1595, Princess Anna ordered her court to assemble in her chapel: she had the envoy Lindorm Nilsson Lilliehöök of her brother King Sigismund escort Gyllenstierna to the chapel, while she herself escorted Brahe: they took the couple to the altar, and before the eyes of her astonished court, she had her vicar conduct a wedding ceremony.

This became a great scandal: by placing the feelings of two individuals before that of their families, Anna had helped them violate, as her contemporaries viewed it, the rights of their families. The families of both Brahe and Gyllenstierna protested as well as the Bielke family, who made demands on the life of Johan Gyllenstierna. In vain, Anna asked her uncle Duke Charles to protect the couple. Eventually, Anna managed to mediate between the families. On Riksdag of 1595 in Söderköping, the feud was ended: Sigrid Brahe and Johan Gyllenstierna were sentenced to one-year house arrest in their country estate and fined for two thousand riksdalers: one thousand to the poor and the other half to Bielke.
