= Gabriel Gustafsson Oxenstierna =

Swedish statesman (1587–1640)

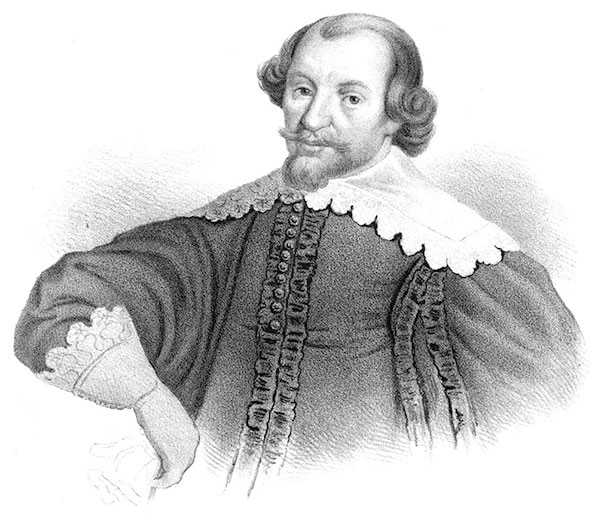
- Lithograph by Strömer, 1849

Lord High Steward of Sweden
- In office 1634–1640
- Preceded by: Magnus Brahe
- Succeeded by: Per Brahe the Younger

Personal details
- Born: 15 June 1587 Tyresö, Sweden, or Reval (now Tallinn, Estonia)
- Died: 27 November 1640 (aged 53) Von der Linderska Palatset, Stockholm, Sweden
- Spouse(s): Märta Bielke; Margareta Bielke; Brita De la Gardie
- Children: Gustaf Gabrielsson Oxenstierna, Ture Gabrielsson Oxenstierna, Johan Gabrielsson Oxenstierna, Gabriel Gabrielsson Oxenstierna
- Website: Person card at Oxenstierna Family Website

Baron Gabriel Gustafsson Oxenstierna (15 June 1587 – 27 November 1640) was a Swedish statesman.

Born either in Tyresö, Sweden, or in Reval (modern Tallinn, Estonia), he was the son of Privy Councillor Gustaf Gabrielsson Oxenstierna and Barbro Axelsdotter Bielke. As such he was brother of, among others, Lord High Chancellor Axel Oxenstierna.

== Career ==
Oxenstierna began studying in Uppsala. He continued to study abroad, in German towns Rostock, Wittenberg and Jena. After his return to Sweden, he was in the service of King Charles IX from 1604. From 1612 he was chancellor and chief adviser of Duke John, son of former King John III. Also in 1612, Oxenstierna was appointed governor of Estonia. In 1617 he became a Privy Councillor and a marshal of the court of King Gustavus Adolphus.

Being a close confidant of older brother Axel Oxenstierna (Lord High Chancellor 1612–1654) as well as of the king, Gabriel Oxenstierna was used as a diplomatic representative on numerous occasions. He was sent as a legate to Denmark both in 1622 and 1625, and during the latter year he also visited Lübeck, Hamburg, Mecklenburg, Brandenburg, Pomerania, the Netherlands and England.

After the death of Gustavus Adolphus in 1632, Oxenstierna travelled to Germany to meet his brother Axel. Gabriel then became responsible to transport the body of the king back to Sweden. In 1634, he became Lord High Steward (riksdrots), making him head of Svea Court of Appeal (Svea Hovrätt) and as such supervisor of justice in Sweden.

== Family life ==
In 1611, Oxenstierna married Märta Bielke, daughter of Privy Councillor Ture Bielke and Margareta Sture. Märta gave birth to seven children, two of which died at an early age. In 1620, Märta died. Two years later, in November 1620, Oxenstierna married again, this time with Margareta Bielke, daughter of Claes Nilsson Bielke and Elin Fleming. Margareta died in 1629 and two years later, Oxenstierna married for the third time, now with Brita De la Gardie, daughter of Pontus De la Gardie and, as such, sister to Lord High Constable Jacob De la Gardie. Oxenstierna's two last marriages were both childless.

Gabriel Gustafsson Oxenstierna died in Von der Linderska Palace, Stockholm on 27 November 1640.

== Legacy ==
Oxenstierna has been described as "reasonable, honest, jovial and outspoken, loved by high and low". Because of his service and loyalty to his home country, his children and grandchildren were created counts, under the name Oxenstierna of Croneberg.

After inheriting Tyresö in the 1620s, Oxenstierna ordered a reconstruction of Tyresö Palace as well as the building Tyresö Church. The church was inaugurated with his own burial in 1641.
