= Gustaf Brahe =

Swedish riksråd and Polish Field marshal

Gustaf Brahe (8 March 1558 – 10 January 1615) was a Swedish riksråd and a Polish Field marshal.

Gustaf Brahe was the son of Per Brahe the Elder and Beata Stenbock, and related to the royal family. He was the paternal grandson of Margareta Eriksdotter Vasa, making him the nephew of king Gustav I of Sweden and cousin of the kings Eric XIV of Sweden, John III of Sweden and Charles XI of Sweden, and a maternal nephew of queen Catherine Stenbock. He was the brother of Erik Brahe (1552–1614), Margareta Brahe (1559–1638), Magnus Brahe (1564–1633), Sigrid Brahe and Abraham Brahe (1569–1630).

Gustaf Brahe is most known for his love affair with princess Anna Vasa of Sweden. They were raised together at court and was reportedly mutually in love with each other, and there where rumors that they met each other in secret in the home of Brahe's sister Ebba Sparre. In 1587, Gustaf Brahe followed Sigismund and Anna to Poland when Sigismund was elected king there. In 1589, he formally asked Sigismund for Anna's hand, and while he was not given a clear answer, he was not refused, which made him hope that he might be accepted. The attempts of marriage between Princess Anna and Gustaf Brahe was often mentioned but ultimately never brought to fruition, and both remained unmarried. The potential marriage between princess Anna and Gustaf Brahe was fiercely opposed by Duke Charles, who viewed it as a plot of Gustav Brahe to make princess Anna ruling queen regnant of Sweden while her only brother Sigismund was absent in Poland, and he therefore used their relationship in his libelous chronicle Karlskrönikan.

In 1593, he was appointed the representative of Sigismund III Vasa in Sweden, and was to assist his brother Erik Brahe (1552–1614) as governor of Stockholm. He returned to Poland after a few months. A temporary estrangement occurred in the relationship between Anna and Brahe when she arranged for his sister Sigrid Brahe to marry for love against the wish of her family, but they soon reconciled.

During the War against Sigismund, he was given a power of attorney by Sigismund to capture and imprison all the enemies of Sigismund he could manage. He left Sweden for Poland with Sigismund and Princess Anna after the Battle of Stångebro.

Gustaf Brahe spent the rest of his life in exile in Poland, as did Anna, and made a military career in Poland to the rank of Field marshal. He died in Danzig in 1615.
