= Erik Sparre =

Swedish noble and statesman (1550–1600)

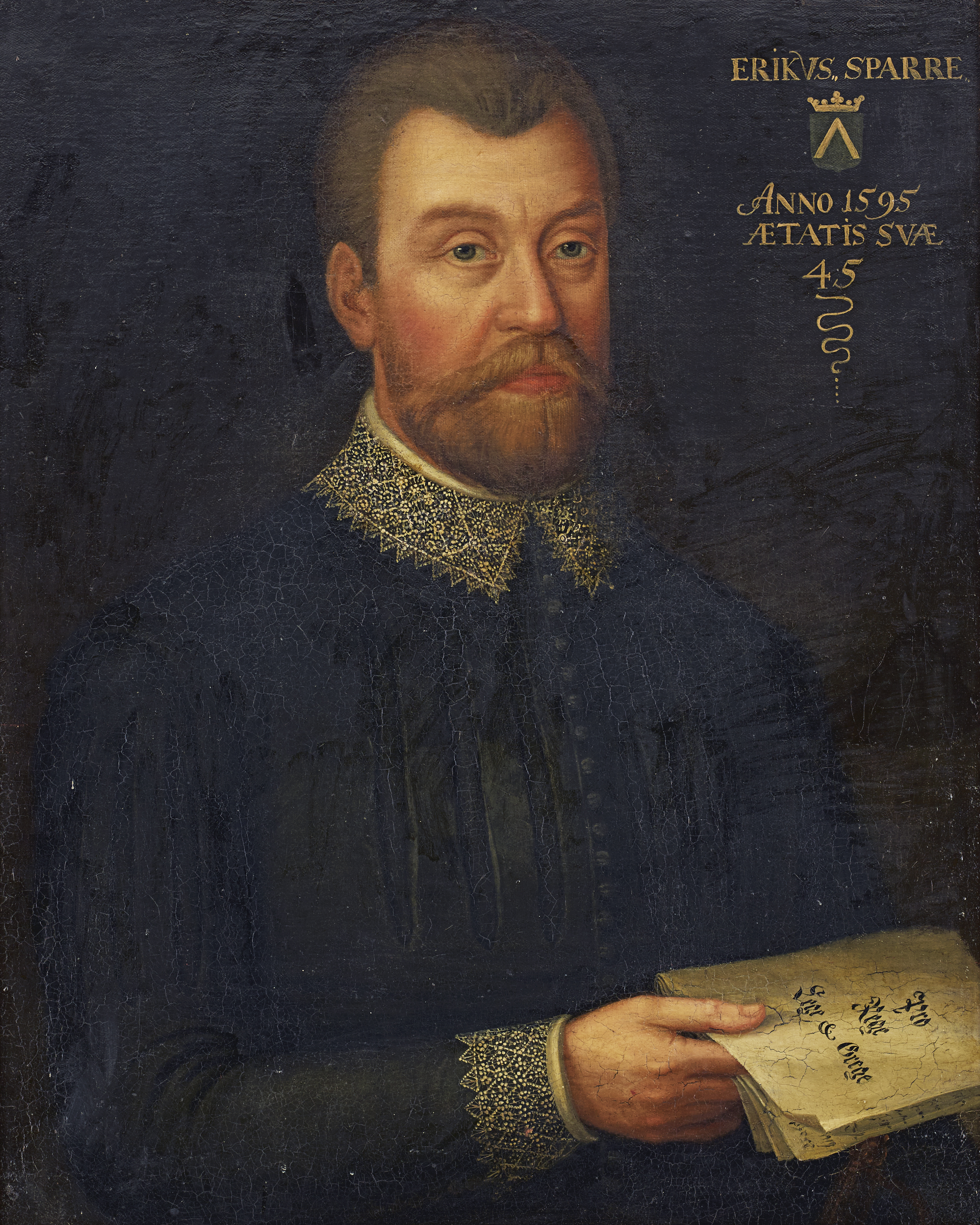
- A 1595 painting of Sparre, holding his treatise Pro rege, lege et grege

3rd Lord High Chancellor of Sweden
- In office 1593 – 20 March 1600
- Monarchs: John III of Sweden; Charles IX of Sweden
- Preceded by: Nils Göransson Gyllenstierna
- Succeeded by: Svante Bielke (Note: There was a short break between Sparre's execution and Bielke's accession; Bielke did not take over the chancellery until 1602.)

Privy Councilor
- In office 1575 or 1576 – 19 February 1590
- Monarch: John III of Sweden

Personal details
- Born: Erik Larsson; 13 July 1550 Öja parish, Södermanland, Sweden
- Died: 20 March 1600 (aged 49) Linköping, Östergötland, Sweden
- Cause of death: Beheading
- Spouse: Ebbe Brahe (m. 1578)
- Children: 12, including: Johan; Lars; Peder; Ture; Carl
- Parents: Lars Siggesson (father); Britta Turesdotter Trolle (mother)

Erik Larsson Sparre (born Erik Larsson; also known as Erik Gyllensparre, Eric Sparre, or Erik Sparre of Rossvik; (Note: Swedish: Erik Sparre av Rossvik; historically Erik Sparre af Rossvik (see Swedish orthography § 1906 spelling reform)) 13 July 1550 – 20 March 1600) was a Swedish noble, statesman, diplomat, and political theorist. He served as Privy Councilor from 1575 or 1576 until 1590 and Lord High Chancellor of Sweden from 1593 until his execution in 1600.

An esteemed orator and rhetorician, Sparre was considered the spokesman for the well-organized aristocratic opposition who advocated for parliamentary sovereignty in the Swedish government and is largely remembered for his contributions to Swedish law. His major written work – Pro lege, rege et grege ('For the Law, the King, and the Masses') – remains highly-regarded as an early defense of contractualism and earned him a reputation as the "father of Swedish constitutional law". Sparre's ideas were initially backed by John III of Sweden in order to check the ambitions of John's brother, Duke Charles, but relations between Sparre and John soured when the nobility was able to overrule the king's prerogative during a stand-off in Reval (modern-day Tallinn, Estonia).

Sparre's diplomatic career was long and varied. He had early successes negotiating with the Danes in border disputes and helped to secure Sigismund III Vasa's accession to the Polish throne. During the discussions of Sigismund's election, Polish and Swedish tensions heightened after a misunderstanding about the annexation of Estonia, a fault that was blamed on Sparre. Following the death of John in 1592, Sparre backed Sigismund's attempt to secure the Swedish crown from Charles, but failed to secure significant material support from potential allies abroad. After Sigismund's defeat, Sparre was convicted of treason during a show trial and beheaded during the Linköping Bloodbath.

== Early life ==
Erik Larsson was born on 13 July 1550 to Lars Siggesson of the noble family Sparre and Britta Turesdotter of the noble family Trolle. Lars was well-regarded, holding a strong reputation and friendship with King Gustav I, serving as his top general. Records of Erik's youth are scarce and often contradictory, but it is likely that he studied abroad between 1569 and 1573; a 1570 record at the University of Frankfurt an der Oder lists a student as Ericus Sparr, nobilis, Suecus ('Erik Sparre, noble, Swede'). He likely furthered his education in Padua, Italy. During his time abroad, Sparre developed exceptionally strong language skills, particularly in Italian and Latin, though he was conversant in French as well. At some point in 1574, he returned to Sweden. On 30 November of the same year, he proposed to Ebbe Brahe, daughter of Per Brahe the Elder; Per was first cousin to John III of Sweden and a highly-influential figure in the Swedish court.

In 1575 or 1576, Sparre was appointed Privy Councilor (Swedish: Riksråd) and had a special interest in the organization of the National Archives. Largely uninvolved in the everyday operations of the office, he was used by the court as a functionary and diplomat. He was effectively utilized as commissioner of negotiations with the Danes in March 1575 regarding the Swedish–Danish border before later being dispatched to the courts of the Count of East Frisia and the Holy Roman Emperor in the summer of the same year. Despite these early successes, Sparre was party to several power struggles between the Crown of Sweden, the Duke, and the high nobility, particularly with regards to the distribution of power. In March 1576, Sparre and other members of the nobility submitted new proposals for the liturgy on behalf of the king and the appointment of higher officials to Duke Charles, which he rejected. On 11 February 1577, Sparre, Brahe the Elder, and two other nobles from Uppland met in Stockholm with the clergy and the king, which affirmed the previous liturgical changes and drew Sparre in the middle of the power struggle between the king and the duke.

Sparre married Ebbe Brahe in 1578 at a house owned by Catherine Stenbock, the dowager queen, on Svartmangatan in Stockholm. John and his first wife, Catherine Jagellonica, were present as guests for three days, while Catherine Stenbock – along with the Margravine of Baden and the Duchess of Mecklenburg – stayed for four or five days; both the margravine and the duchess were cousins of the king. In August 1580, Sparre served as commissioner for another meeting with the Danes in Knäred and, the following year, he and Hogenskild Bielke traveled to the Duchy of Mecklenburg to negotiate a marriage between the king's sister, Elizabeth, and Duke Christopher of Mecklenburg.

In 1582, Sparre was made ståthållare of Västmanland, Bergslagen, and Dalarna. On 1 March of the following year, one of John's officials, a Scotsman named Andrew Keith, honored Sparre with the title of baron. Despite the honor, Sparre claimed never to have requested the title nor petitioned the king to have it recognized as legitimate.

Sparre is considered one of the most learned men of his time, particularly in Sweden. He kept correspondence with many well-known scientists and historians of the era, such as the Danish astronomer Tycho Brahe, and served as one of the Rostock historian David Chytraeus's patrons in Sweden. Sparre's patronage included part of the printing costs of the latter's work, namely his history of the Nordic countries, Chronicon Saxoniae et vicini orbis arctoi ('The Chronicle of Saxony and [Those] Near the Arctic World'), published in 1590.

== Pro lege, rege et grege ==
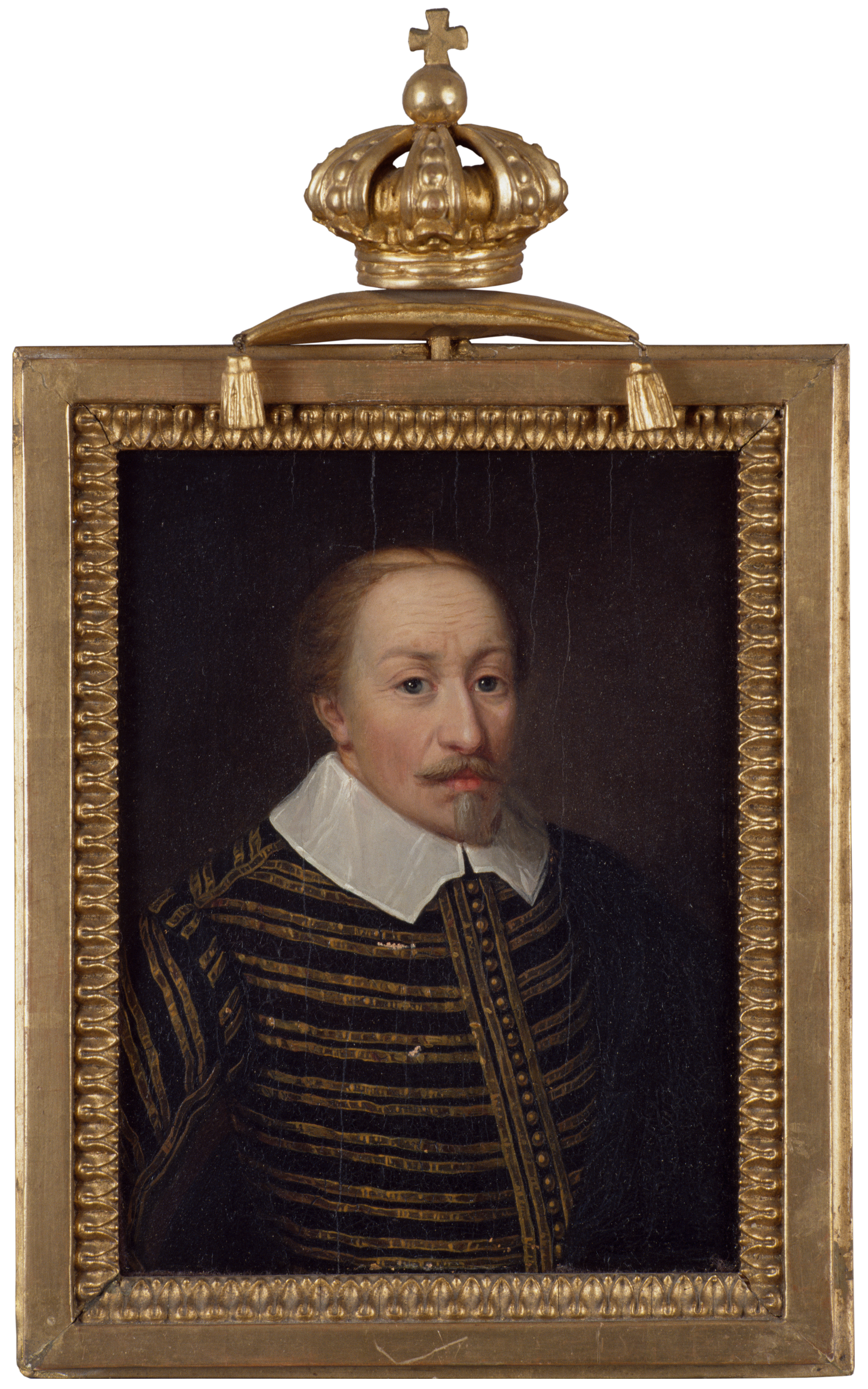
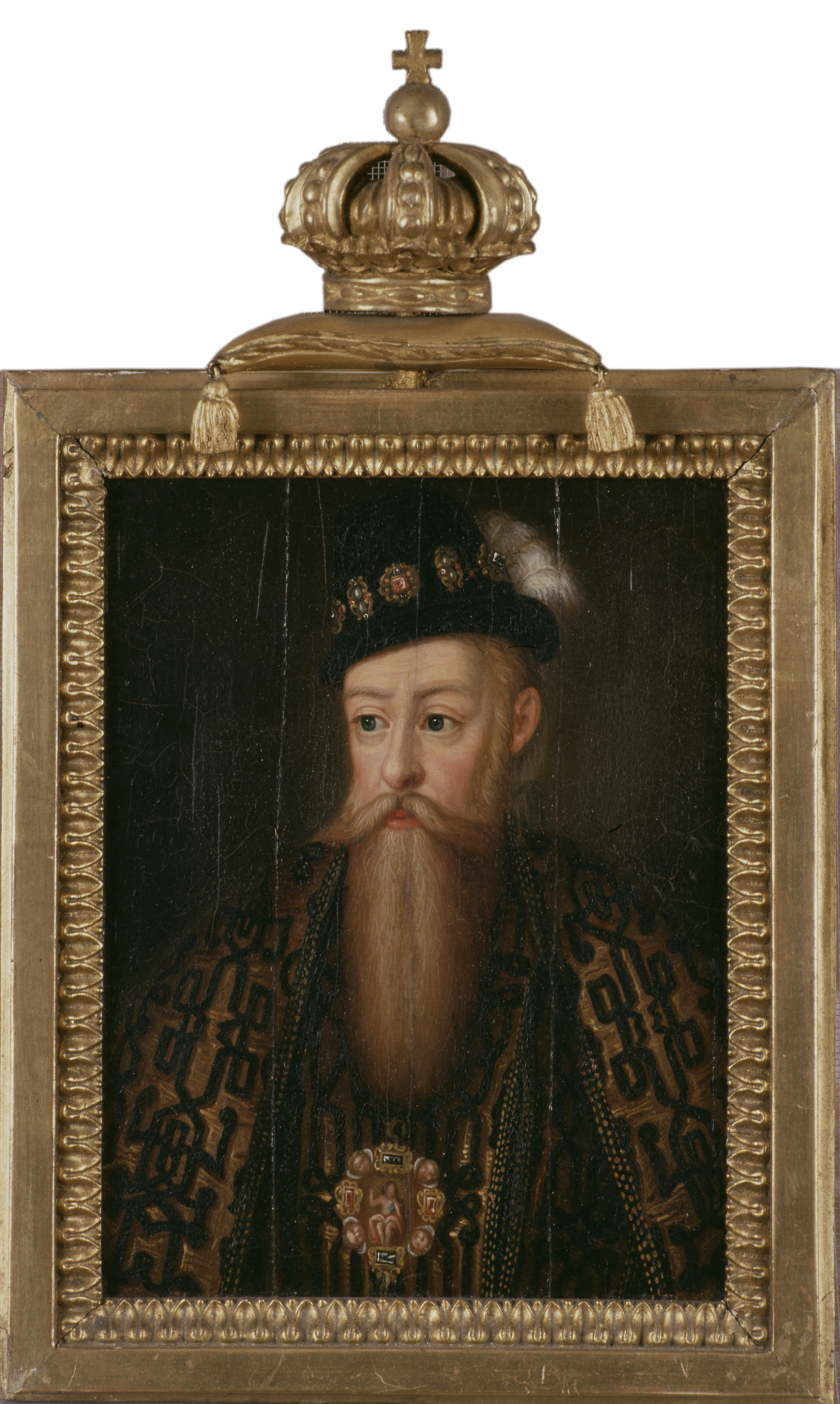
John III of Sweden (right) likely supported Sparre's political work to check the ambitions of his brother, Charles (left).

Sparre was a strong advocate for legislative primacy in Sweden, arguing that the Privy Council of Sweden held a special place in society as the "keystone" of the legal system. Sparre's best-known work is his pamphlet Pro lege, rege et grege ('For the Law, the King, and the Masses'). The date of its publication is of some debate; it is generally accepted that Sparre wrote the Pro lege in 1582, though most sources cite its publication in either 1585 or a more vague "the 1580s". Some sources estimate the date of publication as late as 1586 or 1587.

In the pamphlet, Sparre wrote that the duke was beholden to the laws of the nation and had no sovereign authority; wherever the rights and duties of the Crown interfered, ducal rights were to be subordinated. Sparre further sought to distinguish the office and rights of the king from the office and rights of the Crown, arguing that the possessions of which were not to be minimized in any way, irrespective of any circumstance or sovereign. He argued that the Crown and the king had disparate natures; the king, who is mortal, should not be able to infringe upon the rights and duties of the immutable Crown, which is immortal. Thus, royal titles were issued by the eternal political force of the Crown which could not be trod upon by any mortal king; stately institutions and – most importantly – the nobility were therefore an extension of the immortal Crown. However, dukes served simply as a dominium utile, an extension of the rights and privileges of the king without the same claims to sovereignty, which applied only to "accidents and conveniences" (tillhörigheter och nyttigheter). Consent of the Estates, particularly the "leading Estates", was the cornerstone of the legal process, which bound "all Swedes, present and absent, those who swear and those who do not swear, those born and unborn" to rights and duties. Under the law, the king, as a mortal Swede, was himself beholden to it; the supremacy of law applied to all kings irrespective of their hereditary or elected claims of absolutism. The work is lauded as an early appeal to contractualism and orthodox ideas of constitutional doctrine, comparable to the works of Jean Bodin and James Madison. The success of Sparre's rhetoric, which advocated for common welfare and navigated the differing class interests of the era, has led historians to refer to Sparre as "the father of Swedish constitutional law" and "the father of Swedish constitutionalism".

Sparre stated that he wrote the pamphlet at John's request and historians believe this was likely true; John sought to limit Charles's ambition to concentrate power and saw a strong anti-absolutist nobility as a means to that end. For John at the time, it appears that the risk of usurpation by Charles was of more concern than a conglomeration of power in the legislature. The work was also influenced significantly by Sparre's father-in-law, Per Brahe the Elder, who himself had quarrels with Charles and shared the ideas and sympathies of both Sparre and Hogenskild Bielke, especially in being concerned about the loss of privileges by the nobility and holding a sympathetic view of the Catholic Church.

Sparre is commonly associated with Bielke's political thought. Both held the high nobility as key to the future of Swedish law and sought to use their knowledge of history and law to further that end. The primary difference between them is the source of their jurisprudence; Bielke's sourcing and arguments tended to stem from a pragmatic, German-based legal system, while Sparre's tended to appeal to Roman and contemporary Italian law, citing both the Corpus Iuris Civilis and the Liber Extra – among others – in the Pro lege. Together, Bielke and Sparre had drafted a statute on 27 January 1582 in the Riksdag that interpreted the law decisively against Charles, forbidding him from nominating bishops without the king's consent, trying nobles accused of serious crimes, expanding taxes other than agreed upon for the kingdom, restricting the privileges of the nobles, and much more, though its stipulations were largely ignored.

== Mission to Poland ==
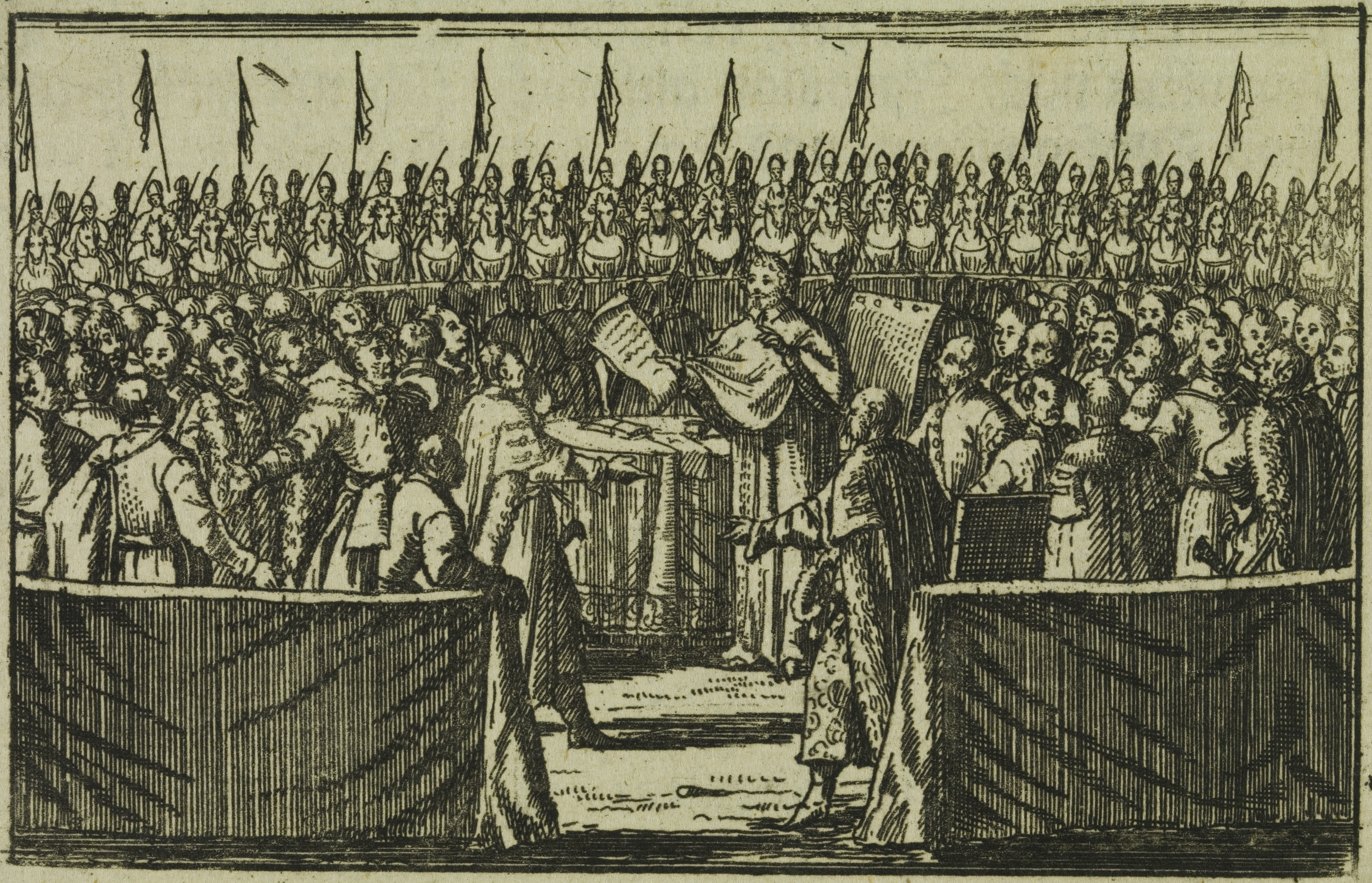
An etching of royal elections in the Polish–Lithuanian Commonwealth

In April and May 1587, Sparre, Hogenskild Bielke, Erik Stenbock, and Sten Banér were invited to develop a plan of governance in the event John's son Sigismund III Vasa were elected King of the Polish–Lithuanian Commonwealth and inherited the throne of his father, making him king in both realms. In August, Sparre and his brother-in-law Erik Brahe were dispatched to the Commonwealth to act as Sigismund's agents. The discussion continued through the summer, but the agreement – now known as the Statute of Kalmar (Kalmare stadgar or Kalmar stadgar) – was signed and sealed by John and Sigismund on 5 September. The Statute provided sweeping guarantees to Sweden's independence, secured a prohibition against Polish interference, and unequivocally defined Estonia as "a Swedish province". Sparre contributed to it significantly, though John was responsible for the final draft, as Sparre was not actually present in Kalmar when it was signed and sealed.

Despite the preparation, Sigismund's accession was not clearly secure until January 1588. During the course of negotiations with the Commonwealth, the Poles insisted that lands conquered by the Swedes in Estonia should be handed over to the Commonwealth. Sparre and Brahe were expressly forbidden from accepting any deal that required the surrender of Estonia into Polish hands. A well-regarded orator and rhetorician, Sparre was able to cinch the election of Sigismund without explicitly promising Estonia, but – according to John – when the pacta conventa was signed, Sparre made verbal promises "in excess of his instructions". (Note: The British historian Michael Roberts suggests that there was probably some truth to John's claims.) These promises were later rescinded from the official compact after negotiations between John and Sigismund, the latter declaring at his coronation that Sweden would never be forced to cede any territory to the Commonwealth, though Sparre continued to be blamed for being willing to sacrifice Estonia for the rest of his life.

== Conflict in Reval and charges of treason ==
The election of Sigismund was fraught with issues, but Sparre and his allies saw a political union with the Polish–Lithuanian Commonwealth as a way of getting aid to Sweden, which was then drawing close to a war with Russia. By 1589, Sigismund was looking to abdicate – assuming he could find a suitable candidate to take his place – and John was losing interest in legal power, seeking to reestablish a familial relationship with his son and return him to Sweden. Nevertheless, both agreed that they could use the union to frighten the Russians into accepting a peace deal; the two hoped that a strong show of military numbers at a meeting in Reval (modern-day Tallinn, Estonia) would cause the Russian leader Boris Godunov to accept a permanent peace. Instead, the forces assembled were underwhelming; the nobility had shirked their usual duty in procuring soldiers.

On 5 August, eight Privy Councilors – including Sparre – accompanied John to Reval with a small entourage of reluctant Polish senators following three weeks later, with no significant armed force. The Privy Councilors agreed that Sigismund could not be allowed to abdicate and that peace should be attained with Russia at all costs and as soon as possible, fearing that the unhappy Poles might ally themselves with Russia if they were badly treated. When the events in Reval turned out to be a disaster, it remained difficult to dissuade John, who had become obsessed with reestablishing a paternal relationship with Sigismund. On 5 September, fifty members of the nobility and eight army commanders signed a petition "castigating his failings as a ruler in terms of extraordinary harshness", appealing to him to abandon the plan. When this failed, ten days later the Privy Councilors attempted again to dissuade John, adding in large text in all capital letters to the bottom VINCAT AFFECTUM RATIO ('May reason triumph over passion'). Both the Swedish and Polish entourages became enraged as John refused to back out. The Polish entourage exhorted Sigismund to return to Warsaw as an invasion of Podolia was underway by the Tartars and the Privy Councilors of Sweden were threatening to leave Reval as well. On 30 September, Sigismund relented and started towards Warsaw. Two days later, John began his return to Sweden.

The events in Reval turned John away from his support of legislative strength and pushed him away from Sparre and his allies; the king had never theretofore capitulated to the nobility. John began seeking out a closer alliance with Charles and – in a final attempt to curtail such an alliance – Sparre, Sten Banér, and Ture Bielke all signed an apology, admitting wrong and promising the king that they would not oppose ceding Estonia if it meant that Sigismund could abdicate the Polish Crown. The attempt, however, was in vain; Charles and John had reached an agreement. In 1590, Sparre, Ture Bielke, Hogenskild Bielke, Gustav Banér, Sten Banér, and Erik Stenbock were removed from the Privy Council, dismissed from their offices, had their fiefs revoked in the presence of the Estates, and imprisoned. John and Charles charged the members of the Privy Council whom they stripped of their rights and privileges with prolonging the war by sabotaging the events in Reval, fomenting disagreement between John and Charles, and attempting to remove Charles from the succession. Sparre in particular was charged with offering Estonia to the Poles. The evidence for this claim was the Statute of Kalmar, which – since it had not been issued to the Riksdag for approval – was considered to be a secret deal to keep Charles from the throne.

Sigismund repeatedly intervened in defense of Sparre and his allies and even Anne of Poland attempted to clear him of all charges relating to the abandonment of Estonia. John accused Sparre and his father-in-law Per Brahe the Elder of conspiracy and accused Sparre alone of having rallied the men in Reval to oust him. Despite these intercessions, Sparre was imprisoned in Stockholm Castle. While in prison, he complained in letters that he had been unable to attend his father-in-law's funeral, that his brother had been imprisoned, and that he was not a heretic in spite of accusations to the contrary. Still more, Sparre's Scottish baronial title was now the object of suspicion, though Sparre never requested the title nor petitioned the king to recognize it as legitimate under Swedish law and indeed denied wanting it. Regardless, on 6 January 1591, John demanded the baronial certificate and destroyed it, though a copy still survives in the Palmskiöldska Collection.

Soon thereafter, Sparre was tried in court. While on the stand, he defended himself with an intensity that caused John to draw his sword in anger, but Charles stopped him. No judgement was passed; Sparre and his associates were neither convicted nor acquitted. In February and March 1592, Sparre avoided arrest twice.

On 17 November 1592, John III died, forgiving all the men who opposed him in Reval on his deathbed in exchange for their promise to remain faithful to Sigismund. Before the end of the month, Charles reached out to Sparre and his colleagues with an offer of reconciliation, but a riot started by Axel Leijonhufvud to convince the locals in Västergötland that Charles was attempting to lead a usurpation of the throne led Charles to accuse Sparre of being behind it. Sparre was able to convince Charles of his innocence in the matter and Leijonhufvud was driven beyond the Danish border.

== Accession of Sigismund III ==
A mutual distrust remained between Sparre and Charles, but Sparre was reinstated as Privy Councilor and appointed Lord High Chancellor of Sweden. On 8 January 1593, they negotiated an interim government whereby Charles was acknowledged as the "leading personage" in Sweden. The rising prominence of the Pro lege became a source of increasing distrust from Charles. When Sparre was late to the Uppsala Synod, arriving in February, it reignited suspicions of heresy, despite his signing of the declaration.

Sigismund moved quickly to secure the throne; in February, he dispatched Sparre's brother, Johan, from Poland to secure oaths of allegiance from fortress commanders in Finland. Sigismund himself arrived in Danzig (modern-day Gdańsk, Poland) in August, his tardiness blamed on the political situation in Poland as the Polish nobility believed he would use the opportunity to abandon the Polish throne. Sparre and Klas Bielke arrived from Poland the following month, escorting Sigismund to Sweden aboard Klas Fleming's fleet. Sparre and Bielke attempted to convince Sigismund to allow the agreement at the Uppsala Synod to be enforced and to confirm the election of a Protestant, Abraham Angermannus, as Archbishop of Uppsala, making him Primate of Sweden. Sigismund, a devout Catholic, refused.

Prior to Sigismund's accession, the nobility and Protestant clergy of Sweden made certain demands, called the Postulata nobilium (lit. 'petitions of the nobility'), to which Sigismund ultimately relented. Sparre served as the spokesman for the nobility and gave a lengthy speech – now known as the Oration of the Nobility (adelns oration) – which cited Hesiod, Salic law, the Bible, and English history, among others in addressing what he had promulgated in his Pro lege, rege et grege. The Oration itself was largely an appeal for the rule of law. During it, Sparre commented:

Where is the great treasure, which could indeed be reckoned at many millions, which existed when King Gustav died? It is all consumed. Where is now the rich and powerful nobility, the ornament and glory of the kingdom, which aforetime could ride its hundreds to court, to the service and honor of king and country? They too are seen no more: a great part are fallen upon the edge of the sword during so many years against so many and various enemies; some has the aforsaid tyrant [Erik XIV] persecuted and done to death; and they who survive are much impoverished. [...] For us in particular and in general, we ask for nothing more than what Sweden's described law and the old freedom of the country allow.

When Sigismund became king, Sparre administered the coronation oath. Sparre was reportedly so tired that his upraised arm became limp during the oath, prompting Charles to forcefully command him to hold it firm until the oath had been fully administered. With Sigismund on the throne, Sparre was reinstated as ståthållare and lawspeaker of Västmanland, Bergslagen, and Dalarna. A period of détente between Sparre and Charles followed; Sparre stood as godfather to Charles's newborn son, Gustavus Adolphus. A short time later, Sparre named his newborn son after Charles.

== Preparations for war and defeat in Sweden ==
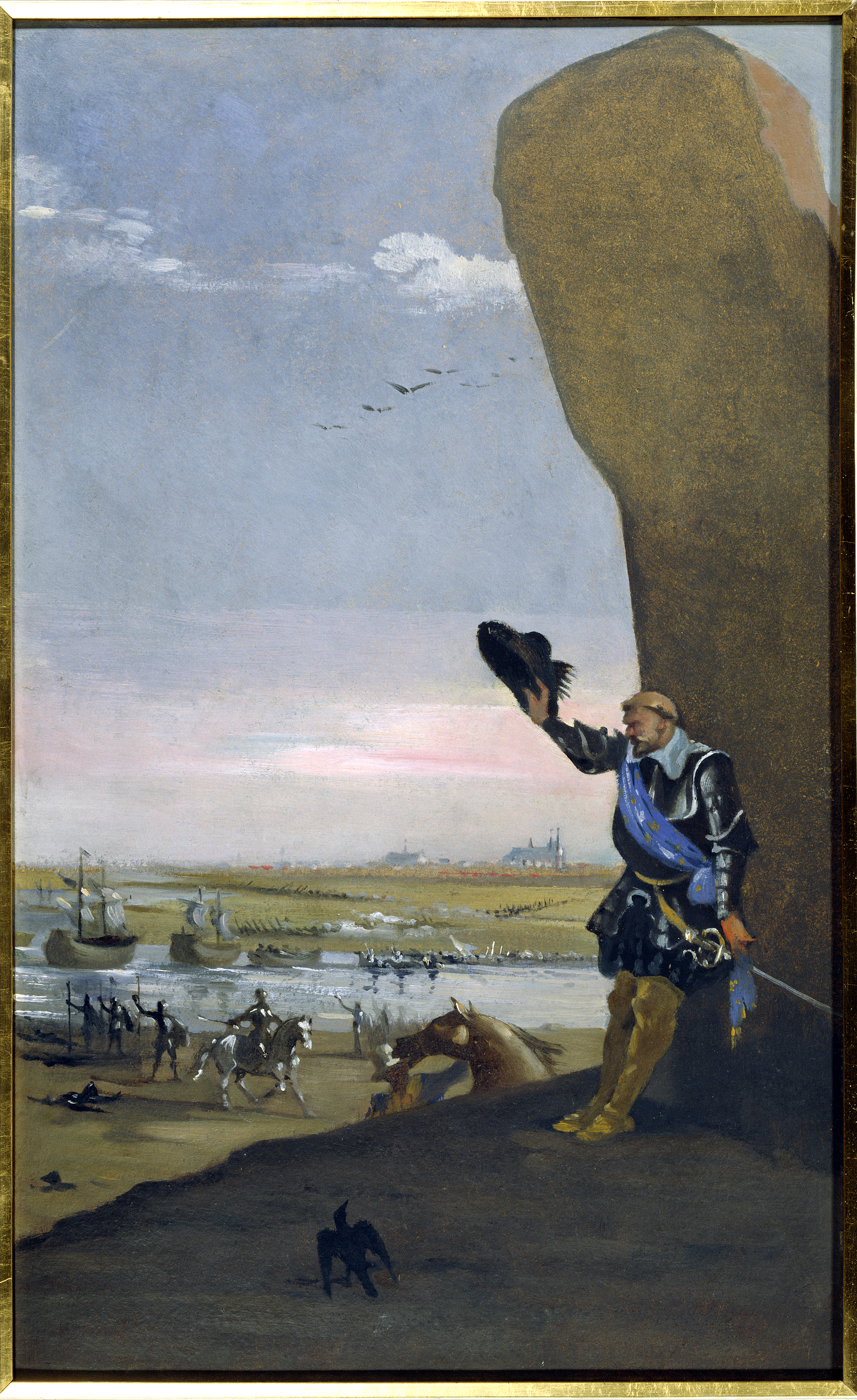
A painting commemorating the Battle of Stångebro by Gotthard Werner, 1889

Sigismund's rule in Sweden was extremely unpopular; he was perceived to have walked back several promises, such as installing Catholics in the government – which served to further alienate him from an increasingly Protestant nation – and failing to institute the agreements made in the Postulata. Charles, on the other hand, was becoming increasingly popular and secured guarantees of authority as riksförestådare in Sigismund's absence with the Arboga Resolution. Sparre initially considered an armed revolt to disrupt Charles's rise to power, but quickly determined that this was an untenable option.

On 20 March 1597, Sparre and Erik Stenbock fled for Denmark before making their way to Poland, with Sten Banér and Jöran Posse following them in May. By the summer, Sparre had convinced Sigismund that war was inevitable to maintain the crown. In December, Sparre was dispatched to visit the Dukes of Mecklenburg and Pomerania to secure their neutrality in the upcoming conflict before heading to Denmark to persuade Christian IV to intervene on behalf of Sigismund. Although he had supported Sparre when Charles attempted to have him extradited, Christian refused to supply armed assistance, at least partially at the behest of his council who believed Sigismund would easily crush Charles's forces. Still, Christian agreed to allow Polish troops to pass through if it became necessary and offered to serve as a mediator who would appear impartial, but ultimately side with Sigismund.

After a protracted conflict, now known as the War against Sigismund, Charles became the decisive winner at the Battle of Stångebro on 25 September 1598, forcing Sigismund to hand over several of his loyalists, including Ture Bielke, Gustav Banér, Sten Banér, Jöran Posse, and Erik Sparre.

== Trial and execution ==
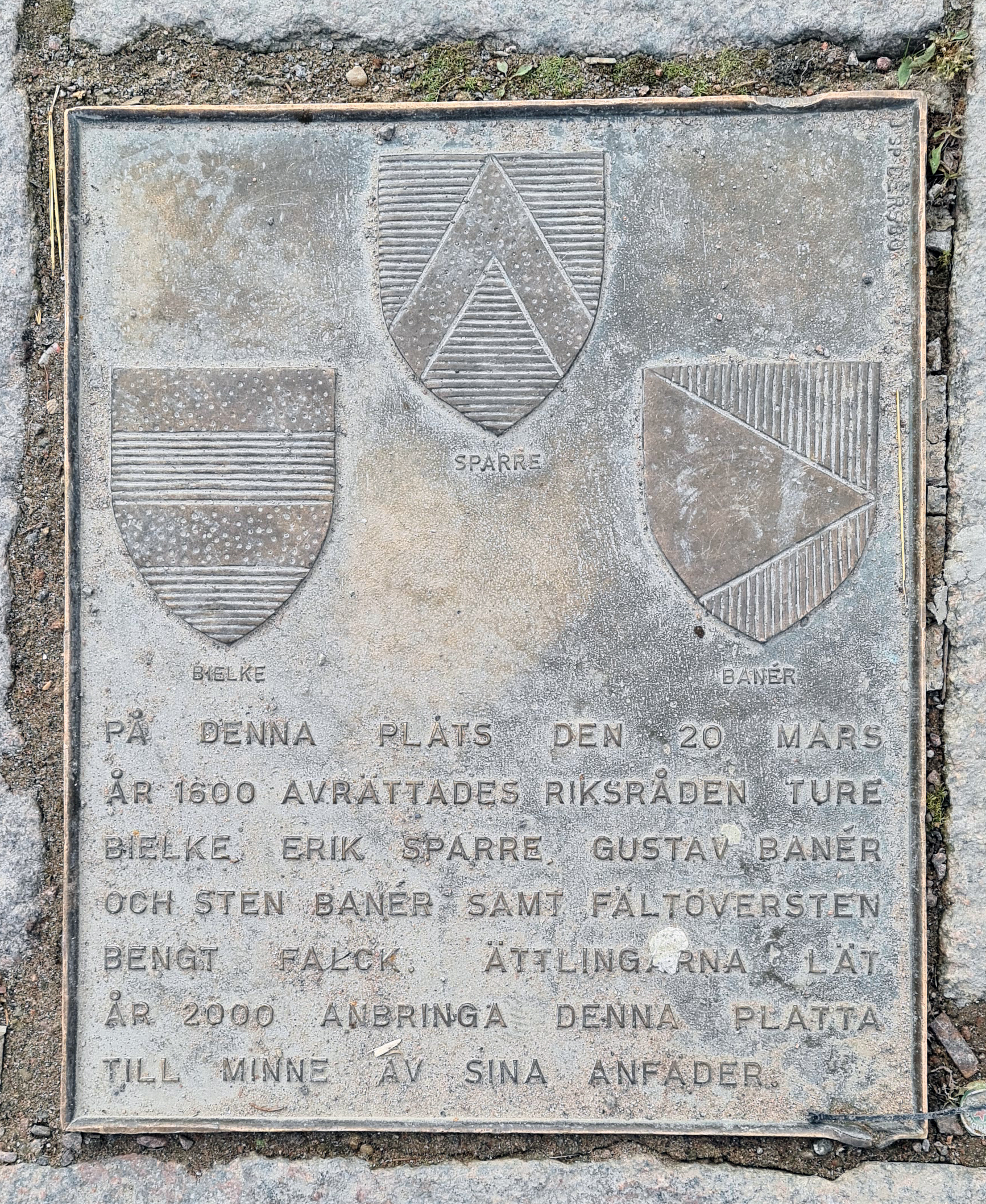
A commemorative plaque for the Linköping Bloodbath placed in 2000 by some of the descendants of those executed

After the Battle of Stångebro, Sparre was taken into custody and imprisoned at Nyköping Castle. While imprisoned, Sparre wrote a defense which was later published in Poland. In an undated letter to Nils Gyllenstierna shortly before his death, Sparre complained that no one visited him, wrote to him, or gave him advice or comfort. He lamented that his parliamentary colleagues did nothing to help intercede on his behalf and thus failed him.

Charles organized a show trial in the nearby town of Linköping with over 150 judges, (Note: Different sources place the number as either 153 or 155.) some of whom were then serving as Privy Councilors. The court was impannelled by Axel Leijonhufvud and Sparre's brother-in-law Erik Brahe, who was a respected Catholic in the country and former ståthallåre. Sparre was charged with treason, attempting to overthrow Protestantism in Sweden, and not recognizing the legitimacy of Charles's position as riksförståndare. Sparre read out a final defense in the hopes of influencing the verdict. When the judgement condemning Sparre was read, Sparre tore up his speech in protest and attempted to console his fellow condemned with another speech. Professing his innocence from the scaffold, in the market square of Linköping on 20 March 1600, Sparre was executed by beheading. The executions that took place later became known collectively as the Linköping Bloodbath. His body was taken to Peder Stiernfelt's house, where it was wrapped before being interred at the Linköping Cathedral. His body was later exhumed and moved to the church in Öja, where his wife Ebba was also buried after her death.
