= Seneschal in Scandinavia =

Position in Medieval Scandinavian Government

Seneschal of the Realm (Danish: Rigsdrost; Swedish: riksdrots; Norwegian: Drottsete; Finnish: Valtakunnandrotsi; other plausible translations are Lord High Steward or Lord High Justiciar) is a Danish and Swedish supreme state official, with at least a connotation to administration of judiciary, who in medieval Scandinavia was often a leader in the government.

== Background ==
The word drots/drost seems to be of German origin (Truchsess) and means a steward or a leader of the household; in Dutch language however, a drost or drossaard was a historical kind of bailiff in parts of the Low Countries. During the Scandinavian Early Middle Age it developed into an even more powerful political position. The drots was responsible of administering royal justice. Other powers easily became added to the position. The Lord High Constable (marsk) and Lord High Chancellor were the other officers that sometimes held the premiership. The Drots held the privilege to be the Regent during a minority or absence of the king.

Quite often, the drots acted as a kind of governor who was the king’s representative and at least officially had precedence over other officials. Less powerful holders of the office of drots often went into the background in favour of the chancellors or other high officers of state.

The office seems to have appeared in Denmark in the 13th century and a bit later in Sweden and Norway. In Sweden, it acquired the official role of "second-in-command" and the regentship at the disappearance of the ancient office of Riksjarl with Birger Jarl as the last holder of that office. It was not quite unusual that also mighty princes like Dukes, as well as royal consorts, had their own drost.

In all three countries the post was abolished in the 1380s. In Denmark it was replaced in importance by the pre-existing title of Steward of the Realm. In Sweden it was soon revived before the mid-15th century and in the 17th century in a new version as Riksdrots, "Drots of the Realm" or "Imperial Drost", which was also used in Denmark for a short while after 1660.

In North Western Germany the word “Landdrost” was used for noble district caretakers until the 19th century. In Hanover the heads of the governmental regions, Landdrosteien, were called Landdroste until 1885.

== See also ==
- Lord High Steward of Sweden
