= Lord High Constable of Sweden =

Government office

The Lord High Constable of Sweden (Swedish: riksmarsk, also marsk) was a high-ranking military and political office in Sweden, dating from the 13th century to 1676, although the position remained vacant during certain periods. The officeholder was a member of the Swedish Privy Council and, from 1630, presided over the military administration that later developed into the War College. Under the Instrument of Government of 1634, the Lord High Constable became one of the five Great Officers of the Realm.

== Middle Ages ==
The earliest recorded reference to the king's marscalcus dates to a letter from 1268, during the reign of Valdemar Birgersson. The title was held by a nobleman, although the duties associated with the office remain unclear. The marsk, or constable, may have succeeded the stabularius, who had previously commanded the king's mounted retinue.

Torgils Knutsson became a leading figure in the Swedish government during the minority of King Birger Magnusson in the late 13th century, although his authority stemmed primarily from his personal influence rather than his position as constable. Subsequent constables appear to have served the king only on specific occasions, without clearly defined administrative responsibilities.

Queen Margaret, who sought to restore royal authority, appointed neither a Lord High Constable nor a Lord High Steward. Her successor, Eric of Pomerania, was compelled by the Swedish nobility to revive the office in 1435, appointing Karl Knutsson Bonde, who later became King of Sweden. A proposed treaty of the Kalmar Union in 1436 outlined the constable's responsibilities, including upholding law and justice, exercising judicial authority alongside the Lord High Steward, and commanding the kingdom's army in wartime. Following Karl Knutsson's accession to the throne, the office declined in importance and remained vacant for much of the remainder of the 15th century.

== Early modern period ==
Lars Siggesson Sparre, long-time constable of Gustav I, was a significant figure during his king's reign, but the office seemingly still lacked any specific assignment. When something reminiscent of a council of war was founded in 1540, the constable was not included. King Gustav's successor, his oldest son Eric XIV, apparently had plans to modernize the constable office, as did the following rulers John III and Sigismund, but those intentions remained unfulfilled.

The title carried no specific responsibilities until 1630, when Jacob De la Gardie became president of the Council of War. The Lord High Constable was second in rank of the five Great Officers of the Realm, established in 1634, who was the five most prominent members of the Swedish Privy Council. When Carl Gustaf Wrangel died in 1676, the office was abolished. King Charles XI, who had come to age four years earlier, wanted to avoid appointing new holders of the high offices, once these became vacant. The riksmarsk title has not been used since, in contrast to two other offices that Charles XI abolished, Lord High Chancellor and Lord High Steward, who were both revived for a relatively short period in the late 18th century.

== Related offices ==
A number of other high offices, that namewise are somewhat similar to the riksmarsk and to some degree inherited assignments that earlier had been attached to the constable office, have figurated in Swedish history.

- The fodermarsk appeared in the late Middle Ages and was responsible for the foddering of the court's horses.
- The first hovmarskalk, Marshal of the Court, was appointed in c. 1540 and the office is still in use. Earlier, the office holder was supervising the economy of the court. Today's First Marshal of the Court is the head of the Office of the Marshal of the Court (Hovmarskalkämbetet), which is responsible for preparing the public appearances and state visits of the Swedish Royal Family.
- Göran Klasson Stjernsköld became the first riksmarskalk, Marshal of the Realm, in 1607. As such, he was the head of the royal court, and that is still a valid description for the holder of the office.

== Lord High Constables of Sweden ==
- Torgils Knutsson (c. 1290–1306)
- Karl Ulfsson, Lord of Tofta (1364–1371)
- Karl Knutsson Bonde (1435–?)
- Nils Stensson Natt och Dag (1439)
- Tord Karlsson Bonde (1453 or 1454–1456)
- Ture Turesson (Bielke) (1457–1464)
- Svante Nilsson Sture the Elder (1497–?)
- Lars Siggesson Sparre (1523–1554)
- Svante Nilsson Sture the Younger (1561–1564)
- Gustaf Olofsson Stenbock (1569–1572)
- Klas Fleming (c. 1591–?)
- Magnus Brahe (1602–1611)
- Axel Nilsson Ryning (1611–1620)
- Jacob De la Gardie (1620–1652)
- Gustaf Horn (1653–1657)
- Adolf Johan of Pfalz-Zweibrücken (1660)
- Lars Kagg (1660–1661)
- Carl Gustaf Wrangel (1664–1676)

== Gallery ==
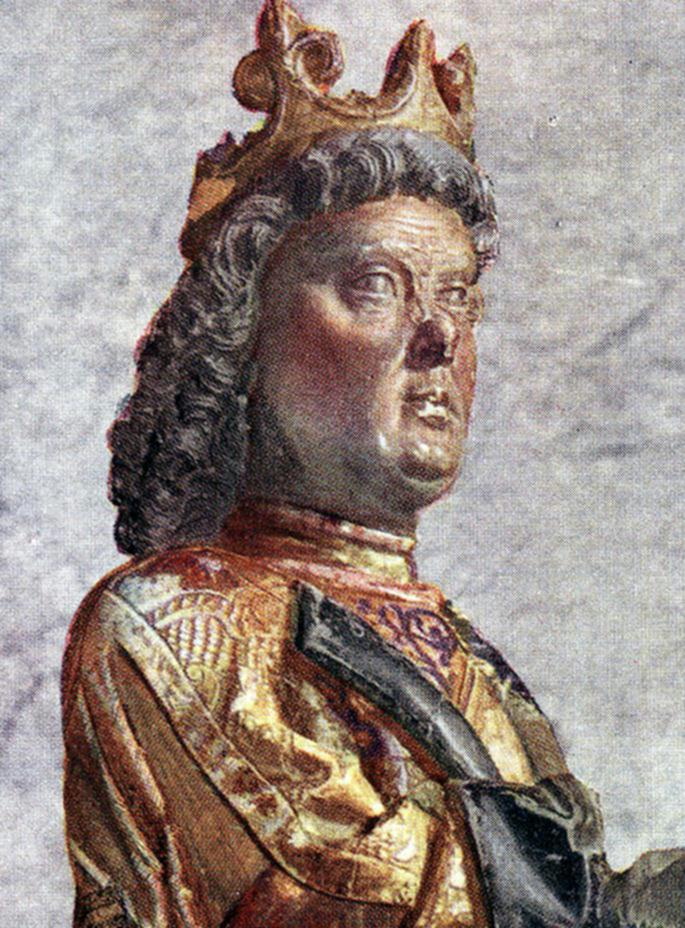
Sculpture of Karl Knutsson Bonde, Lord High Constable of Sweden

Lars Siggesson Sparre, Lord High Constable (1523–1554)

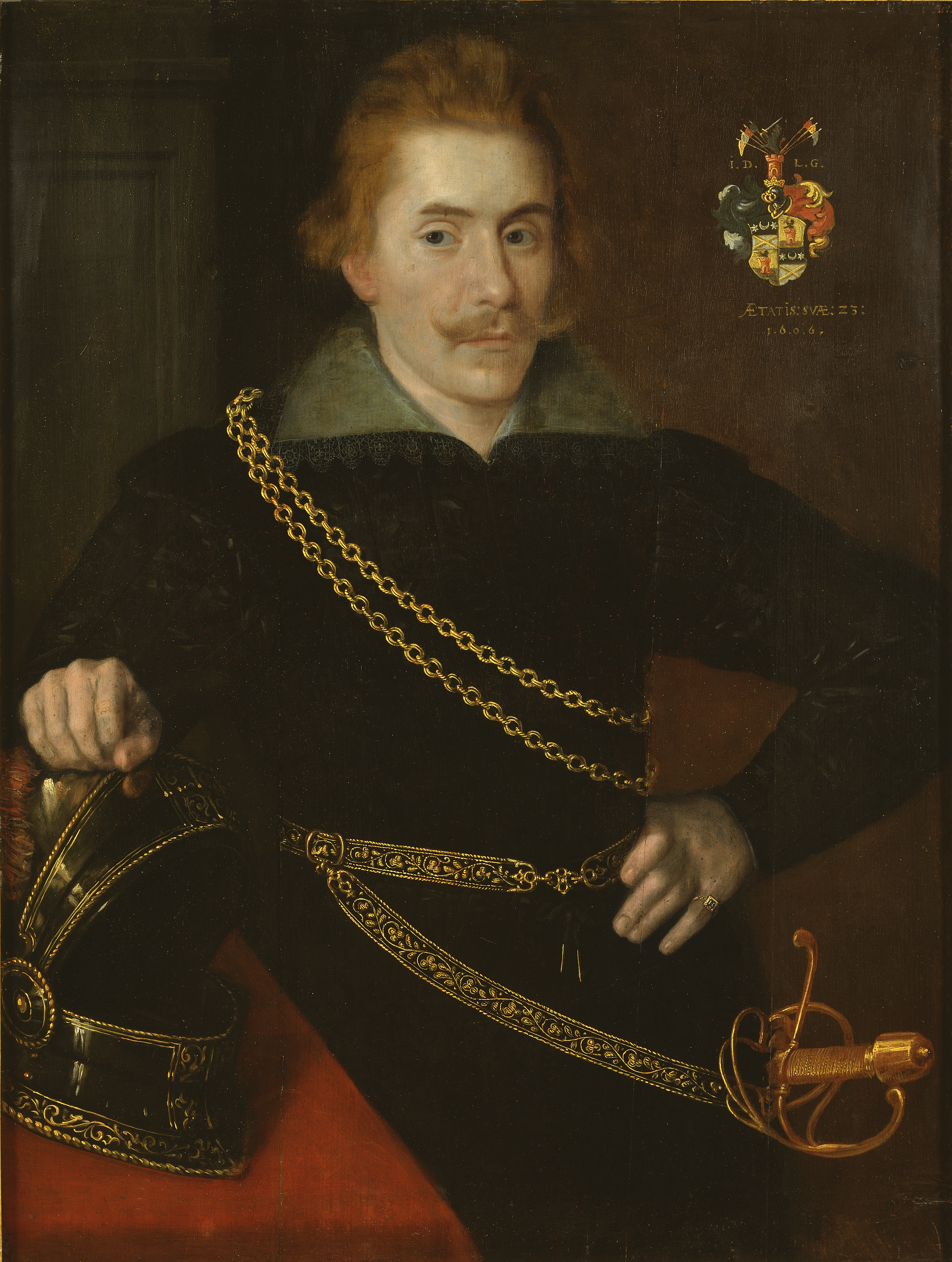
Jacob De la Gardie, Lord High Constable (1620–1652)

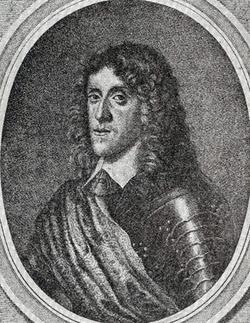
Adolf Johan of Pfalz-Zweibrücken, Lord High Constable (1660)

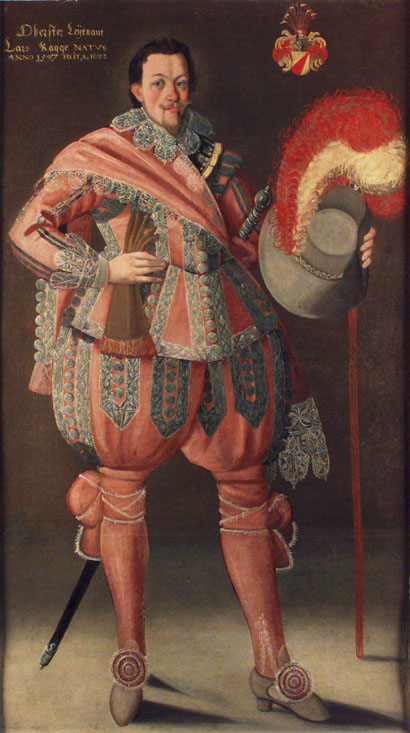
Lars Kagg, Lord High Constable (1660–1661)

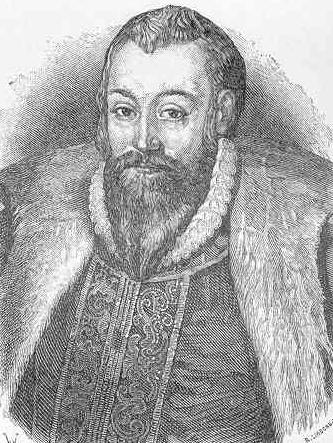
Svante Sture the Younger, Lord High Constable (1561–1564)

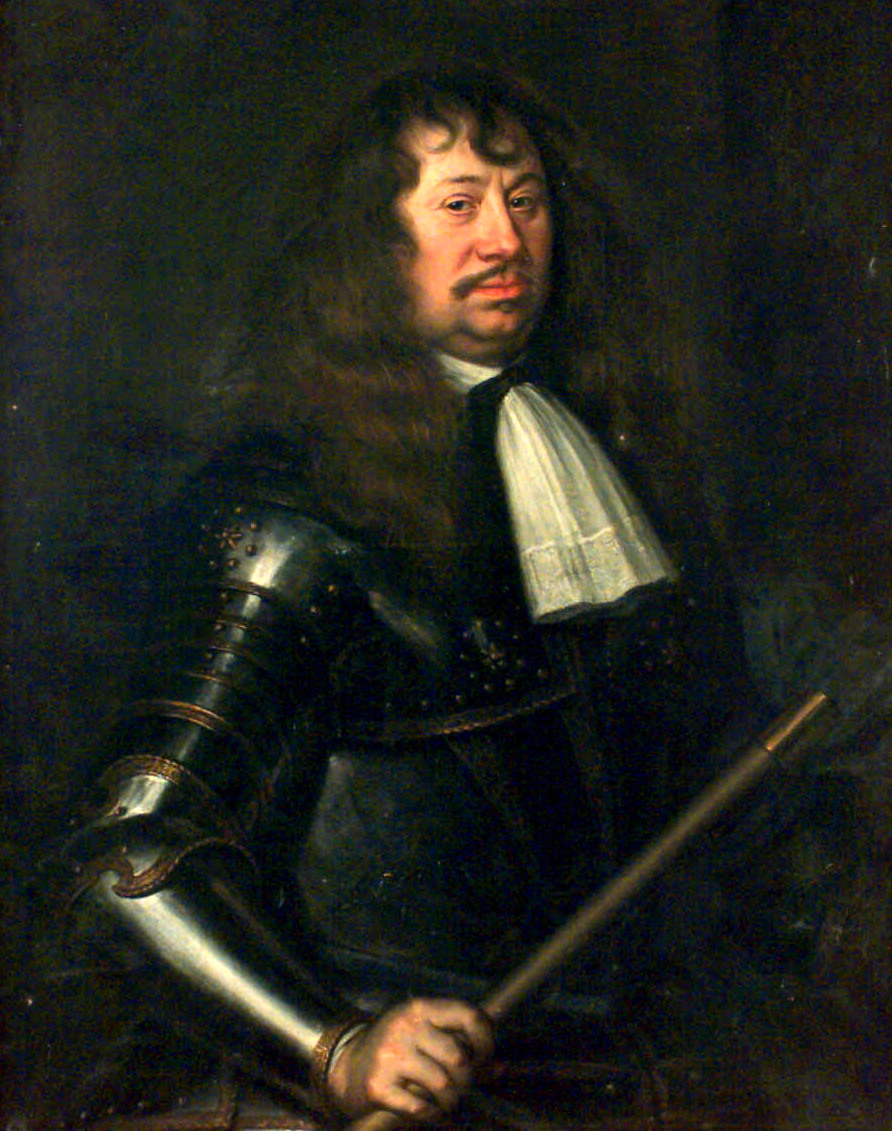
Carl Gustaf Wrangel, Lord High Constable (1664–1676)
