= War College (Sweden) =

The War College (Swedish: Krigskollegium), originally established by Gustavus Adolphus in 1630, started as a military court but evolved into a central administrative agency responsible for the army. Over time, it underwent several reforms, losing its central role and jurisdiction, and by 1866, it was absorbed into the Royal Swedish Army Materiel Administration. Its functions changed under different monarchs, and it went through multiple reorganizations, including the introduction of departments and the establishment of a General War Court. Despite these changes, its core responsibilities revolved around military administration, such as artillery, fortifications, commissariat, and payroll matters.

== History ==
The origins of the War College can be traced back to the court-martial that Gustavus Adolphus established before his departure to Germany. On 5 July 1630, he granted Marshal Jacob De la Gardie the authority to establish an institution in Stockholm with this name and appointed its members in the authorization while provisionally defining its tasks. Initially, it appears that the court-martial primarily served as the highest military court and not as an administrative body. Gustavus Adolphus had previously intended to create a kollegium for the general management of the military, and a War Council (Krigsråd) was mentioned among his intended government institutions in the 1620s, but this plan was not realized at that time. However, in the 1634 Instrument of Government, the War Council was included as "the second college" among the five national colleges, and its responsibilities were defined to include both administrative oversight of "all the cavalry and infantry of the army" and ensuring that "all matters within the army are judged and regulated correctly." It was to be "directed" by the marshal, and two (military) privy councillors and four other officers, including the field marshal, the master general of ordnance (rikstygmästaren), and the master of the guard (generalvaktmästaren), were appointed as his assistants. Secretary, notaries, and copyists were mentioned as subordinate staff. Over time, this reorganized government agency became operational, with its first (provisional) regulations dated 20 March 1636, and its name changing to the War College.

King Charles XI, who generally sought to dissolve the heavily burdened national colleges into smaller government agencies, thoroughly reformed the War College as well. No Lord High Constable was appointed after 1676 (when Carl Gustaf Wrangel died); a privy councillor was appointed as the president, but the collective activities of the agency were mainly divided into relatively independent commissions or bureaus, each reporting directly to the king. In particular, the treasury office was directly subordinate to him, and the accounts were placed under the Swedish Crown Lands Judiciary Board. A "general military court" would only be formed when necessary by summoning the required number of generals.

By 1699, even the president position disappeared, and by 1700, the college consisted only of the master-general of the ordnance, two war councils (krigsråd), and two lower-ranking officials. When Charles XII departed for the war against Russia, he entrusted the highest leadership of the military to a special defence commission composed of councilors, which soon overshadowed the War College. After the king's return to Sweden in 1715, further changes followed as part of the new order for the entire government that was being introduced, and the War College lost jurisdiction over a multitude of matters, some of which were brought directly under the new War Office (Krigsexpeditionen), while others were entrusted to specially appointed officers.

With the fall of absolutism and the restoration of the new constitution, the administrative system of the 17th century was essentially reinstated. The War College was also reorganized, partly through the constitutional reforms of 1719 and 1720, and partly through a new instruction issued on 16 October 1723. Its president was now chosen from outside the Privy Council; under him, both military members worked in separate offices and two civilian war councils. Gustav III introduced new changes. In 1774, the War College regained the General War Court (Generalkrigsrätten) and was strengthened with new members. At the same time, a separate Defence Commission was established alongside it, and in 1776, the Privy Councillor Carl Sparre was entrusted with the highest supervision of the military. Both of these arrangements ceased in the 1780s; however, the War College was reorganized through a new instruction on 25 June 1782, with its most important feature being the division into five departments; only a few matters, such as legal cases and appointments, needed to be handled in plenary session. In 1792, a separate General Adjutant's Office (Generaladjutantsexpeditionen) was established for the army, and command matters were entrusted to it. Subsequent instructions (4 April 1805, 19 March 1811, 17 December 1831, 6 November 1849, and 21 November 1850) made some adjustments to the organization and working methods of the War College, including the number of departments, but the principles remained largely unchanged. The final instruction (of 1850) prescribed 4 departments: the artillery, fortifications, commissariat, and payroll departments. With the beginning of 1866 (through an instruction dated 26 September 1865), the War College was transferred to the Royal Swedish Army Materiel Administration.
