= Per Brahe the Elder =

Swedish statesman

Per Brahe the Elder

Per Brahe the Elder (1520–1590) was a Swedish statesman.

Brahe was the son of Joakim Brahe (died 1520 in the Stockholm Bloodbath) and Margareta Eriksdotter Vasa, the sister of Gustav Eriksson Vasa, who became King of Sweden in 1523. Brahe was thus the cousin of three future kings, Eric XIV, John III and Charles IX, all of them sons of Gustav Vasa.

Brahe was among the first members of the Swedish nobility to be created a count when titles of nobility were introduced by King Eric XIV on the occasion of his coronation in 1561. Brahe was given the county of Visingsborg, situated on Visingsö, the next year. He had been member of the Privy Council of Sweden and Governor of Stockholm Castle from 1540. At the accession of King John III, he was appointed the Lord High Justiciar of Sweden (riksdrots) and Governor of Norrland as well as Governor of Stockholm Castle again.

He married Beata Stenbock (1533–1583), daughter of Gustaf Olofsson Stenbock and Brita Eriksdotter Leijonhufvud, and elder sister of Gustav Vasa's third wife, Katarina Stenbock. Brahe's mother-in-law was the daughter of Erik Abrahamsson Leijonhufvud and Ebba Eriksdotter Vasa, the mother of Gustav Vasa's second wife, Margaret Eriksdotter Leijonhufvud. (Ebba Eriksdotter Vasa was herself a second cousin of Gustav Vasa.)

Brahe was the father of Erik Brahe (1552–1614), Gustaf Brahe (1558–1615), Margareta Brahe (1559–1638), Magnus Brahe (1564–1633), Sigrid Brahe and Abraham Brahe (1569–1630), and the grandfather of Per Brahe the Younger (1602–1680), Ebba Brahe and Margareta Brahe.
