= Lord High Steward of Sweden =

The Lord High Steward or Lord High Justiciar (Swedish: Riksdrots or only Drots) was a highly prominent member of the Swedish Privy Council from the 13th century until 1809, excluding periods when the office was out of use.

== Middle Ages ==
The first mentioning of the title drots in Sweden, concerns the reign of Magnus Ladulås and the year 1276. It is difficult to say anything definite about the status of the office at that time, but sources from the 14th century shows the width of the power of the Lord High Steward. The influence seems to have been vast, as long as the steward managed to stay out of doing things against the will of the king himself. The steward was the king's closest confidant and during the guardian regency at the time of Magnus Eriksson's adolescence (1319–1331), the title holder (mostly Knut Jonsson) was the mightiest man in Sweden.

In the latter stages of the 14th century, during conflicts between the king and the Swedish noblemen, the title became more independent and less attached to the king. The wealthiest and most famous of the Swedish aristocrats of the time was arguably steward Bo Jonsson Grip, who disposed of king Magnus Eriksson and then dominated the king he helped to install instead, Albrekt. After Jonsson Grip had died in 1386, no new steward was appointed until 1435, when the noblemen forced king Eric of Pomerania to do so.

== Early modern period ==
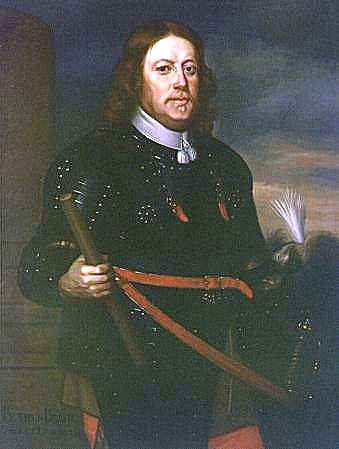
Per Brahe the Younger – Lord High Steward 1641–1680

The title was pushed aside by another office, hovmästare, and not until Per Brahe the Elder was appointed steward by John III in 1569, was the title revived. Albeit honorable, the title meant no particular assignment until 1614, when Lord High Steward Magnus Brahe was put in charge of the newly established Svea Court of Appeal, the highest court of Sweden at the time. The steward became responsible of supervising justice in Sweden. From 1634, the steward was one of five Great Officers of the Realm, who were the most prominent members of the Privy Council. Lord High Steward had the highest rank of the five officers, and because of that, the steward was the most important figure during the regencies who ruled when Christina and Charles XI had not yet come of age.

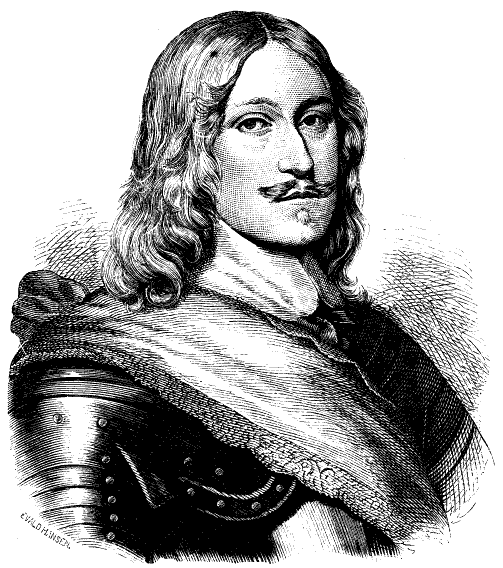
Magnus Gabriel De la Gardie – Lord High Steward 1680–1684

Sweden suffered from political turmoil under the regency when Charles XI's was still a minor, which brought about changes to among others the Lord High Steward and the other Great Officers of the Realm. The significance of the office had decreased when Magnus Gabriel De la Gardie got the position when Per Brahe the Younger died. After De la Gardie, no new steward was appointed.

The title Lord High Steward was revived once more in 1787, when Gustav III gave Carl Axel Wachtmeister the title and put him in charge of all Swedish high courts. In 1809 the office was once again withdrawn when a new constitution was established in Sweden. The new office State Minister of Justice became the new head of the Swedish justice system.

== Lord High Stewards of Sweden ==
- Ulf Carlson (1276)
- Knut Matsson (1280)
- Magnus Ragvaldsson (c. 1288)
- Abjörn Sixtensson (–1310 (drots of Duke Erik Magnusson))
- Knut Jonsson (1312–1316)
- Johan von Brunkow (1316–1318)
- Mats Kettilmundsson (1318–1319)
- Knut Jonsson (1322–1334 (second term))
- Greger Magnusson (1334–1335)
- Nils Ambjörnsson (1335–?)
- Greger Magnusson (?–1338 (second term))
- Nils Turesson (–1364)
- Bo Jonsson (Grip) (1371–1386)
- Krister Nilsson (Vasa) (1435 – c.1440)
- Per Brahe the Elder (1569–1590)
- Nils Göransson Gyllenstierna (1590–1595)
- Mauritz Stensson Leijonhufvud (1602–1607)
- Magnus Brahe (1612–1633)
- Gabriel Gustafsson Oxenstierna (1634–1640)
- Per Brahe the Younger (1641–1680)
- Magnus Gabriel De la Gardie (1680–1684)
- Carl Axel Wachtmeister (1787–1809)
