= Privy Council of Sweden =

Cabinet of advisors to the Swedish king

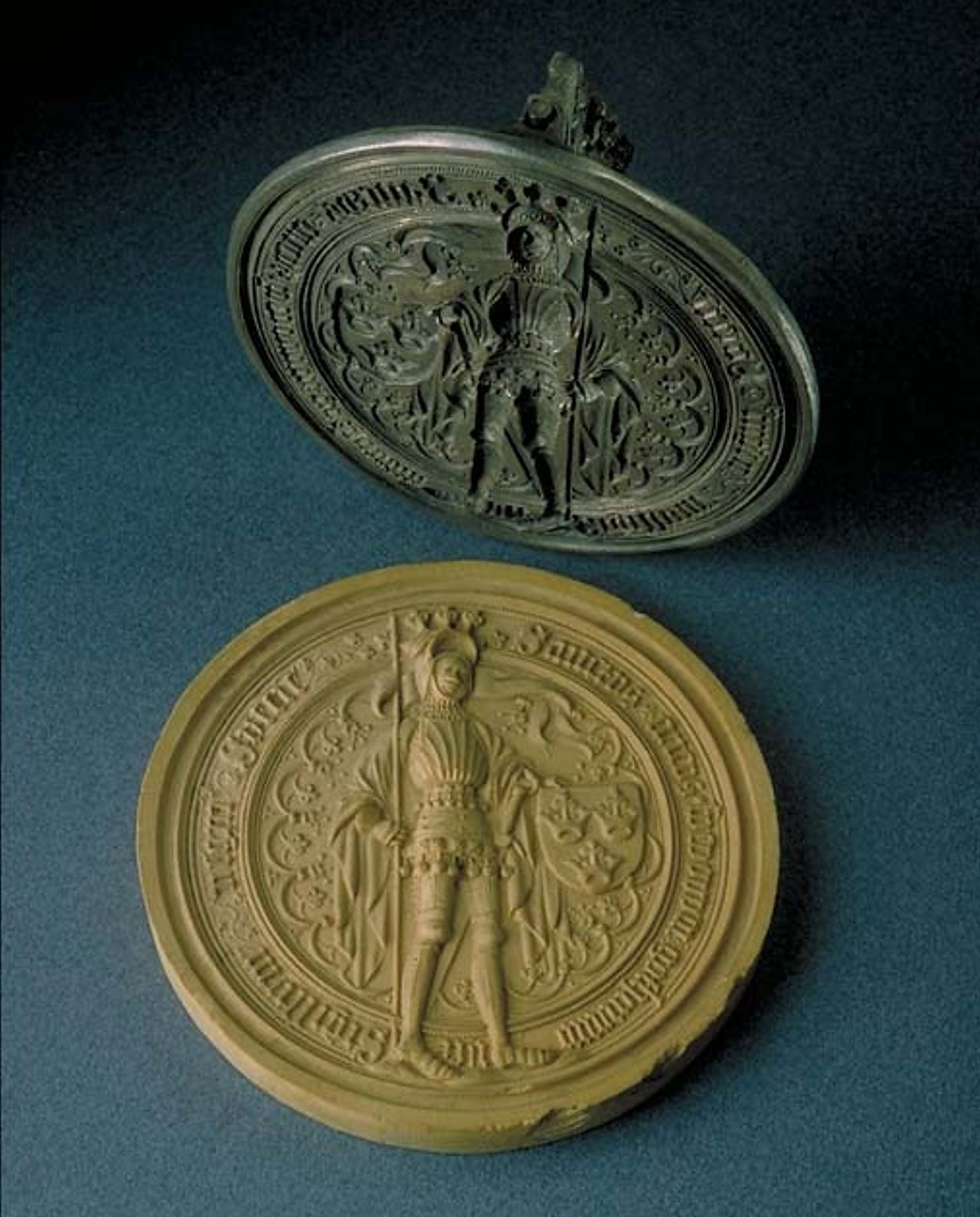
The Great Seal of the Council, in usage from 1436 to 1523.

The Council of the Realm, or simply The Council (Swedish: Riksrådet or Rådet: sometimes in Latin: Senatus Regni Sueciae), was a cabinet of medieval origin, consisting of magnates (stormän) which advised, and at times co-ruled with, the King of Sweden.

The 1634 Instrument of Government, Sweden's first written constitutional 'basic law', stipulated that the King must have a council, but he was free to choose whomever he might find suitable to be a member, as long as they were of Swedish birth. At the introduction of absolutism, Charles XI had the equivalent organ named as Royal Council (Kungligt råd). In the Age of Liberty, the medieval name was reused. After the bloodless revolution of Gustav III, the Council was abolished in 1789 by the Union and Security Act.

The 1809 Instrument of Government, created a Council of State, also known as the King in Council (Konungen i Statsrådet) which became the constitutionally mandated cabinet where the King had to make all state decisions in the presence of his cabinet ministers (Statsråd). Throughout the 19th century and reaching its culmination with the enactment of the 1974 Instrument of Government, this new Council gradually transformed into an executive cabinet of ministers known as The Government (Regeringen), chaired and formed by the Prime Minister who since 1975 is elected by the Riksdag, and which governs the Realm independently of a purely ceremonial monarch.

== Middle Ages ==
During the reign of Magnus Ladulås between 1275 and 1290 the meetings of the council became a permanent institution having the offices of Steward (Swedish: Riksdrots), Constable (Riksmarsk) and Chancellor (Rikskansler). Particularly from the reign of King Gustav Vasa, with his efforts of creating a centralised state, the members of the Council (Riksråd) gradually became more of courtiers and state officials rather than the semi-autonomous warlords they once were.

== Early modern Sweden ==
Following the change of policies upon the death of Gustav II Adolf in action at Lützen in 1632, the 1634 Instrument of Government written by Chancellor Axel Oxenstierna laid the foundation for the administration of modern Sweden. For instance, the roots of the present-day administrative subdivision into counties (Swedish: Län) is a legacy from this time.

The Instrument established that the council was to be headed by the five Great Officers of the Realm, each leading a branch of the state administration:

- Lord High Steward (or Lord High Justiciar (riksdrots))
- Lord High Constable (riksmarsk)
- Lord High Admiral (riksamiral)
- Lord High Chancellor (rikskansler)
- Lord High Treasurer (riksskattmästare)

Initially, three of the positions were occupied by the members of the Oxenstierna family, with Axel Oxenstierna's brother Gabriel Oxenstierna as the High Justiciar and his cousin Gabriel Bengtsson Oxenstierna as the High Treasurer. These positions were later abolished under Charles XI.

== Parliamentarism ==
The councillors had the highest position in the kingdom after the royal family and were styled "the King's cousins". From around 1672, the year of the coming of age of Charles XI, the council was assembled less and less frequently and eventually the king ruled autocratically, using an ad hoc group of trusted relations and advisors to discuss a particular matter or group of matters. The Scanian War (1674–1679) gave the king the opportunity to establish – with the approval of the Estates – an absolute Monarchy along the lines of Renaissance Absolutism. Council, Parliament, local government, legal system, Church of Sweden, all were brought within the power of the King and his secretaries.

This was the culmination of a long power-struggle between the kings and the aristocracy. The first of the Riksdag Acts ratifying the change of system was a declaration that the king was not bound by the 1634 constitution, which no king or queen had ever consented to freely. The councillors were now titles Royal Councillors, being appointed and dismissed at the king's pleasure.

In 1713, the son and successor of Charles XI, Charles XII, issued a new working order for the Chancellery to enable him to conduct government from the battle-field, but his sudden death at the siege of Fredricshald in Norway in 1718 provided the opportunity for the parliament (Riksdag of the Estates) to write a new constitution in 1719 and 1721, that gave Sweden half a century of first renewed conciliatory, and then parliamentary government.

The first Estate, the nobility, dominated both the parliament and the council. The council now had 16 members and was chaired by the King. Each councillor had one vote, while the king, as chairman, had two. The council was the government of the country, but also the supreme judicial authority.

From 1738 the Estates could remove councillors to create a majority corresponding to that of the Estates, the Estates also appointing the President of the Chancellery (the prime minister), along party lines. The Freedom of the Press Act (1766) was also passed during this period.

This Age of Liberty lasted until the bloodless coup d'état of king Gustav III in 1772, which restored royal sovereignty under the guise of the 1634 Instrument of Government.

In 1789, by the Union and Security Act (Swedish: förenings- och säkerhetsakten), an amendment charter to the constitution, the exclusive right of the nobility to high offices was abolished and the Estates of the Burghers and the Peasants also received these privileges - a step towards modern democracy. Aristocratic control of state organs ceased, and the Privy Council was abolished, although the councillors retained their titles for life. The council's judicial function devolved on the King's Supreme Court (Konungens Högsta Domstol) composed of an equal number of noble and non-noble members. In the 1789 constitutional amendment Gustav III, having desired to abolish the constitutional power of the Council (a pesky limitation to royal rule of the executive branch, in his view), had instead received the right to determine the number of councillors. He decided to have zero of them, instead he created the office of Rikets allmänna ärendens beredning, which was a predecessor to the Council of State.

== Developments in 1809 and beyond ==
The loss of the Finnish War in 1809 prompted a military coup which removed Gustav IV Adolf, replacing the Gustavian era with a new dynasty and a new constitution restoring initiative to the Estates.

On 6 June 1809, a new constitution was adopted, and while the King still appointed the members of the Council, once again called the Council of State, the legislative powers were once again shared with the Riksdag of the Estates.

The new Council had nine members; the leading members being the Minister of State for Justice (Swedish: Justitiestatsminister) and the Minister of State for Foreign Affairs (Utrikesstatsminister). The departmental reform of 1840 created seven ministries headed by a minister, and in 1866 the four Estates were abolished and the new bicameral Riksdag was constituted.

In 1917, as the outcome of the 1914 Courtyard Crisis (Swedish: Borggårdskrisen), the parliamentary system was firmly established in Sweden, and the King could no longer independently appoint cabinet members without taking the will of the Riksdag into account.

== List of Lords High Chancellor and Presidents of the Chancellery from 1680 to 1809 ==
- Count Bengt Oxenstierna (June 1680 – 1685; acting) (1685 – 12 July 1702)
- Count Nils Gyldenstolpe (12 July 1702 – December 1705; acting) (December 1705 – 4 May 1709)
- Count Arvid Horn (21 March 1710 – 10 April 1719)
- Count Gustaf Cronhielm (15 May 1719 – 12 December 1719)
- Count Johan August Meijerfeldt (12 December 1719 – 22 April 1720; acting)
- Count Arvid Horn (22 April 1720 – 18 December 1738)
- Count Gustaf Bonde (18 December 1738 – 16 April 1739; acting)
- Count Carl Gyllenborg (16 April 1739 – 9 December 1746)
- Count Carl Gustaf Tessin (9 December 1746 – 5 December 1747; acting) (5 December 1747 – March 1752)
- Count Andreas Johan von Höpken (17 March 1752 – 5 February 1761)
- Count Claes Ekeblad (10 April 1761 – 12 August 1765)
- Count Carl Gustaf Löwenhielm (9 September 1765 – 7 March 1768)
- Baron Fredrik von Friesendorff (7 March 1768 – 30 May 1769; acting)
- Count Claes Ekeblad (30 May 1769 – 9 October 1771)
- Count Ulrik Scheffer (9 October 1771 – 22 April 1772; acting)
- Count Joachim von Düben (22 April 1772 – 22 August 1772)
- Count Ulrik Scheffer (23 August 1772 – 5 June 1783)
- Count Gustaf Philip Creutz (5 June 1783 – 30 October 1785)
- Baron Malte Ramel (30 October 1785 – May 1786)
- Baron Emanuel de Geer (May 1786 – 13 June 1787)
- Count Johan Gabriel Oxenstierna (May 1786 – 14 November 1789)
- Count Karl Wilhelm von Düben (1788 – 8 November 1790)
- Baron Evert Wilhelm Taube (29 March 1792 – 1792)
- Baron Fredrik Wilhelm von Ehrenheim (28 May 1801 – 28 March 1809)
- Count Lars von Engeström (May 1809 – June 1809)

== See also ==
- History of Sweden
- Monarchy of Sweden
- Riksdag of the Estates
- Government of Sweden
