= Erik Brahe (1552–1614) =

Swedish noble (1552–1614)

- Count of Visingsborg

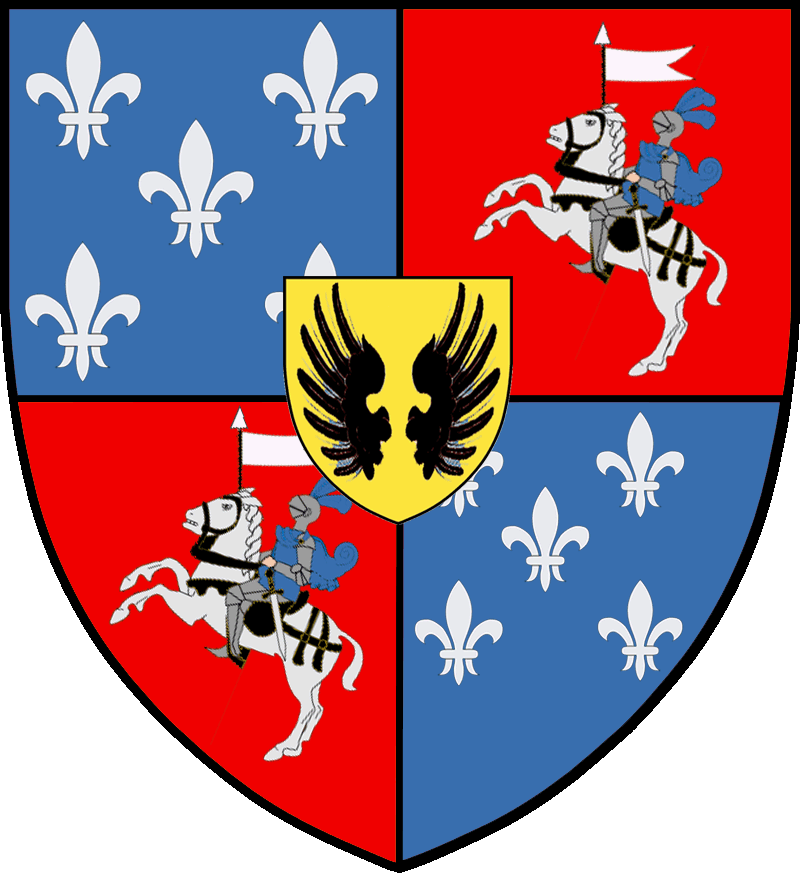
- Coat of arms
- Born: 4 September 1552; Västergötland
- Died: 15 April 1614 (aged 61); Danzig
- Spouse: Elisabeth of Braunschweig-Lüneburg (m. 1582)
- Parents: Per Brahe the Elder (father); Beata Gustavsdotter Stenbock (mother)

Erik Brahe (born 4 September 1552 at Sundholmen Castle in Västergötland, died 15 April 1614 in Danzig in Poland) was a Swedish governor, councilor and count of Visingsborg.

== Biography ==
He was the son of Beata Gustavsdotter Stenbock and Per Brahe the Elder.

After foreign travels, Brahe served as a young man at court, both under John III and Sigismund. He subsequently received several diplomatic missions and was a Swedish envoy at the election of the king in Poland in 1587, where he contributed to Sigismund being elected king of Poland, and was strongly influenced by the Catholic environment at court. In 1591 he followed Sigismund to Poland and converted there to Catholicism. That same year, he assumed the county of Visingsborg after the death of his father, Per Brahe the Elder. After his return, Brahe became governor of Tre Kronor Castle in Stockholm, but had difficulty cooperating with Duke Karl, who was already seeking power and saw in Brahe Sigismund's obedient tool.

He married on 24 June 1582 at Harburg Castle in Braunschweig in Germany Duchess Elisabeth of Braunschweig-Lüneburg (1553–1618) of the Welf family, daughter of Duke Otto II of Braunschweig-Lüneburg-Harburg (1528–1603) and Countess Margareta von Schwarzburg -Leutenberg (1529–1559). The marriage was unhappy, partly because he was Catholic and she Protestant, but also because Erik had several extramarital affairs. In 1596 the women's affairs were costing him the whole county. Duke Karl had had enough of all the scandals and wanted to bring Visingsborg into the crown with the justification that the count "was found guilty of fornication, not once but many trips". But Erik got to keep the county and his favorite at the time, Anna Filipsdotter Kern, was able to give birth to their son Gustav on Visingsö in 1598 (see Örnevinge).

At Sigismund's landing in Sweden, Brahe was on his side, but after the battle of Stångebro, Erik took Duke Karl's side. Participated together with the brothers in the trial in 1600 against the councilors loyal to Sigismund. The end was, among other things, that Erik's second brother-in-law Erik Larsson Sparre was executed. He hardly found himself particularly well settled in Sweden and left the country already the same year. In Poland he tried to regain Sigismund's confidence, but in vain, and he thereafter led a roving existence in Europe. In Prague in 1601 he met a distant relative, the famous astronomer Tycho Brahe, who belonged to the Danish Brahe family. Tycho Brahe died quite suddenly a few weeks later.

His interesting diary entries, written in cipher, which were found and referenced by Sven Tunberg, give an unusual for its time insight into the private affairs of a nobleman.

== Family ==
Children with Elisabeth of Braunschweig-Luneburg:

- Beata Margareta Brahe, (1583–1645), gift 1607 med riksrådet Gustav Eriksson Stenbock.

Children with Anna Filipsdotter Kern:

- Gustav Örnevinge
