= Gabriel Bengtsson Oxenstierna =

Swedish statesman, jurist and diplomat (1586–1656)

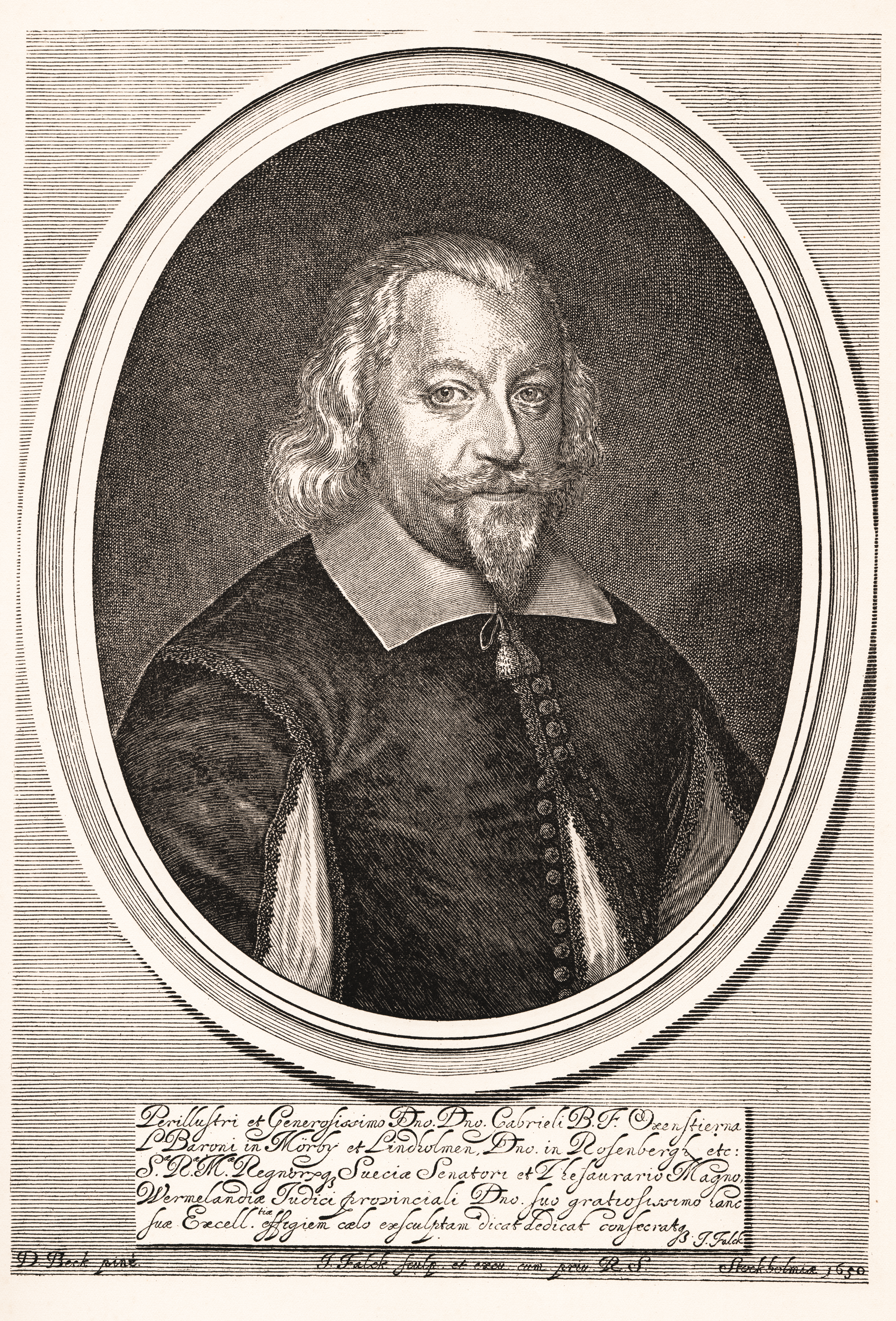
- Gabriel Bengtsson Oxenstierna in an engraving by Jeremias Falck (1650)
- Born: 18 March 1586
- Died: 12 December 1656 (aged 70)
- Spouse: Anna Gustafsdotter Banér (m. 1610–1656; her death)
- Children: 11
- Parent(s): Bengt Gabrielsson Oxenstierna the Elder; Sigrid Gustafsdotter Tre Rosor

Gabriel Bengtsson Oxenstierna af Korsholm och Wasa, 1st Count of Korsholma and Vaasa (18 March 1586 – 12 December 1656) was a Swedish statesman, jurist and diplomat.

== Biography ==
Oxenstierna was born on 18 March 1586 at Lindholmen Castle, Västergötland. He was the son of Bengt Gabrielsson Oxenstierna the Elder, councillor to Duke Charles of Södermanland, Närke and Värmland (later King Charles IX), and his first wife Sigrid Gustafsdotter (Tre Rosor). He was orphaned at an early age.

Like other contemporary members of the influential Oxenstierna family, he was educated abroad and entered the service of King Charles IX upon his return in 1606. He retained royal favour during the rule of King Gustavus Adolphus and was made Governor-General of Reval and Swedish Estonia in 1611, subsequently being appointed Privy Councillor and Master of the Ordnance in 1617. Alongside his more famous cousins, Lord Chancellor Axel Oxenstierna and Gabriel Gustafsson Oxenstierna, he was made responsible for arming the Swedish army during the Polish–Swedish War and was part of the governing council in the King's absence. He was made Hovrättsråd and Lawspeaker of Värmland in 1627 and was part of the Swedish diplomatic delegation to the Holy Roman Emperor during the 1630 peace negotiations in Danzig.

In 1631, he was appointed Governor-General of Finland, continuing the work of his predecessor Nils Turesson Bielke to improve the central administration and legal system. He returned to Stockholm after the death of King Gustavus Adolphus to become part of the regency council for Queen Christina in 1633, becoming Lord High Treasurer of Sweden in 1634. However, the Chancellor Axel Oxenstierna and Steward Gabriel Gustafsson Oxenstierna thought him less suited for the post, as he was inexperienced on state economics and unable to stop the embezzlement of state funds during the regency. In 1645, the Oxenstierna administration was removed by Queen Christina upon reaching maturity.

The Queen appointed Oxenstierna Governor-General of Swedish Livonia in 1645, a post which he resigned from in 1647. He was created 1st Count of Korsholma and Vaasa by the Queen in 1651, one of the largest fiefdoms in Sweden, and was appointed supreme naval administrator as Lord High Admiral of Sweden in 1652, without previous naval experience.

He improved the finances of his county but received numerous complaints from the peasantry of Ostrobothnia due to tax increases and labour requirements.

Oxenstierna died in 1656 at Edsberg Manor in present-day Sollentuna and was buried in Fasterna Church.

== Family ==
Oxenstierna married Anna Gustafsdotter Banér (1585–1656), a daughter of Gustaf Banér, in Stockholm on 7 October 1610. With the marriage, Anna Banér began a long period of childbearing: on 15 September 1612, the couple's first child, Sigrid, was born in Uusimaa, Finland, followed by ten more children in quick succession between 1613 and 1626, including Gabriel, Bengt and Gustaf Gabrielsson Oxenstierna. All but two of their children survived to adulthood.

He was an older half-brother of Bengt Bengtsson Oxenstierna and a cousin of Axel and Gabriel Gustafsson Oxenstierna.

Oxenstierna founded the comital af Korsholm and Wasa branch of the Oxenstierna family, the only male-line branch still in existence today.

== Ancestry ==
Ancestors of Gabriel Bengtsson Oxenstierna

8. Kristiern Oxenstierna
4. Gabriel Oxenstierna
9. Anna Sested
2. Bengt Oxenstierna
10. Erik Trolle
5. Beata Trolle
11. Karin Gyllenstierna
1. Count Gabriel Bengtsson Oxenstierna af Korsholm and Wasa
12. Johan Turesson Tre Rosor
6. Gustav Johansson Tre Rosor
13. Kristina Gyllenstierna
3. Sigrid Gustavsdotter Tre Rosor
14. Kristoffer Andersson Ekeblad
7. Ingeborg Christoffersdotter Ekeblad
15. Brita Jönsdotter Roos af Ervalla

Political offices
Preceded by Nils Turesson Bielke	Governor-General of Finland; 1631–1633	Succeeded by Per Brahe the Younger
