= Banér =

Banér is a surname. Notable people with the surname include:

- Gustaf Banér, member of the Privy Council of Sweden
- Johan Banér, Swedish Field Marshal in the Thirty Years' War, son of Gustaf Banér
- Per Gustafsson Banér, member of the Privy Council of Sweden, son of Gustaf Banér
- Sigrid Banér, noblewoman and letter writer, daughter of Gustaf Banér
- Sigrid Eskilsdotter (Banér) (died 1527), Swedish noblewoman
- Svante Svantesson Banér – Swedish privy councillor

== See also ==
- Baner, a suburb of Pune, India
