= Leather wallpaper =

Type of wallpaper

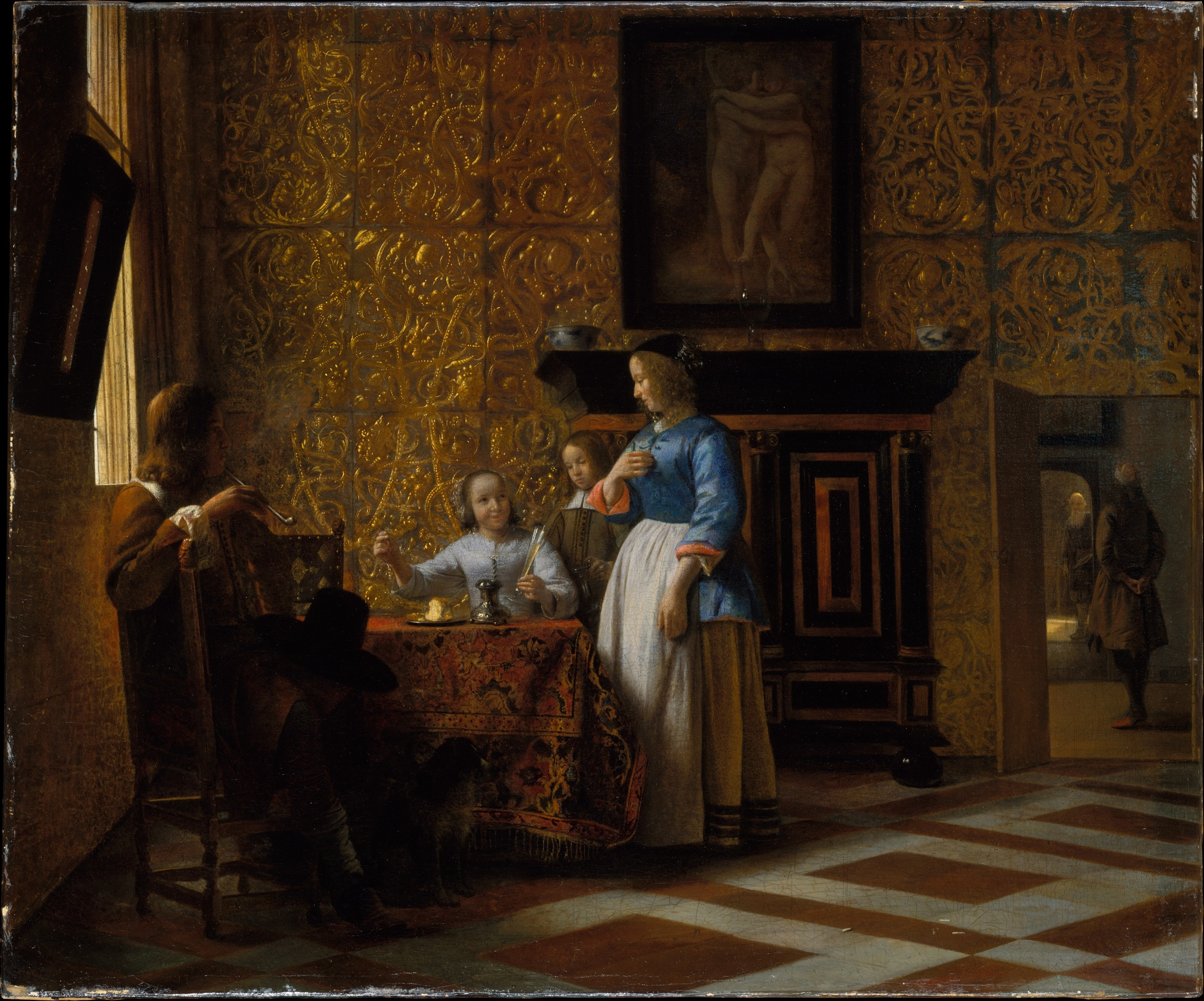
17th-century Dutch interior with gold leather hangings, Pieter de Hooch (c. 1665), Metropolitan Museum of Art

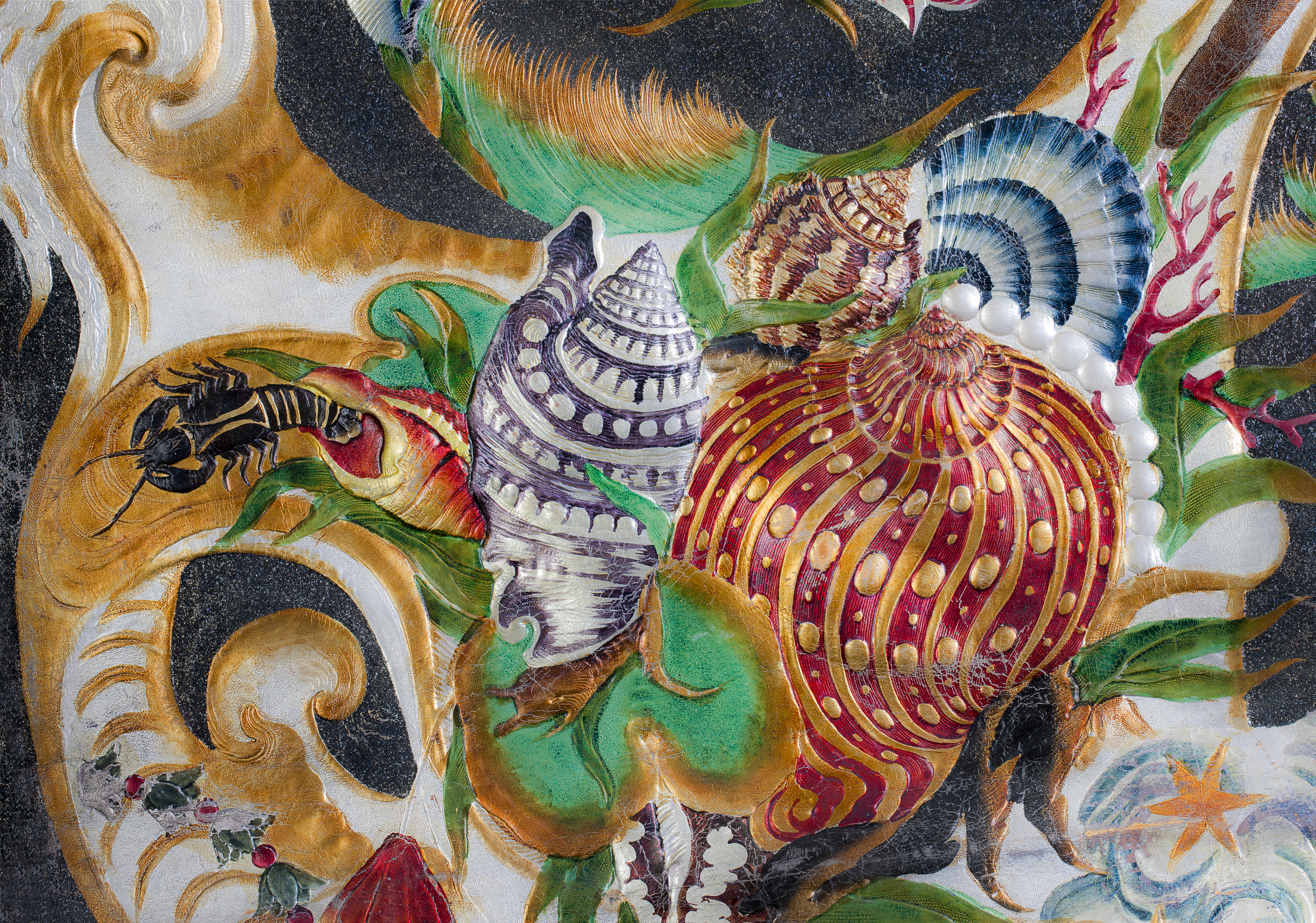
Detail of gold leather hangings at Skokloster Castle, 1660–1700

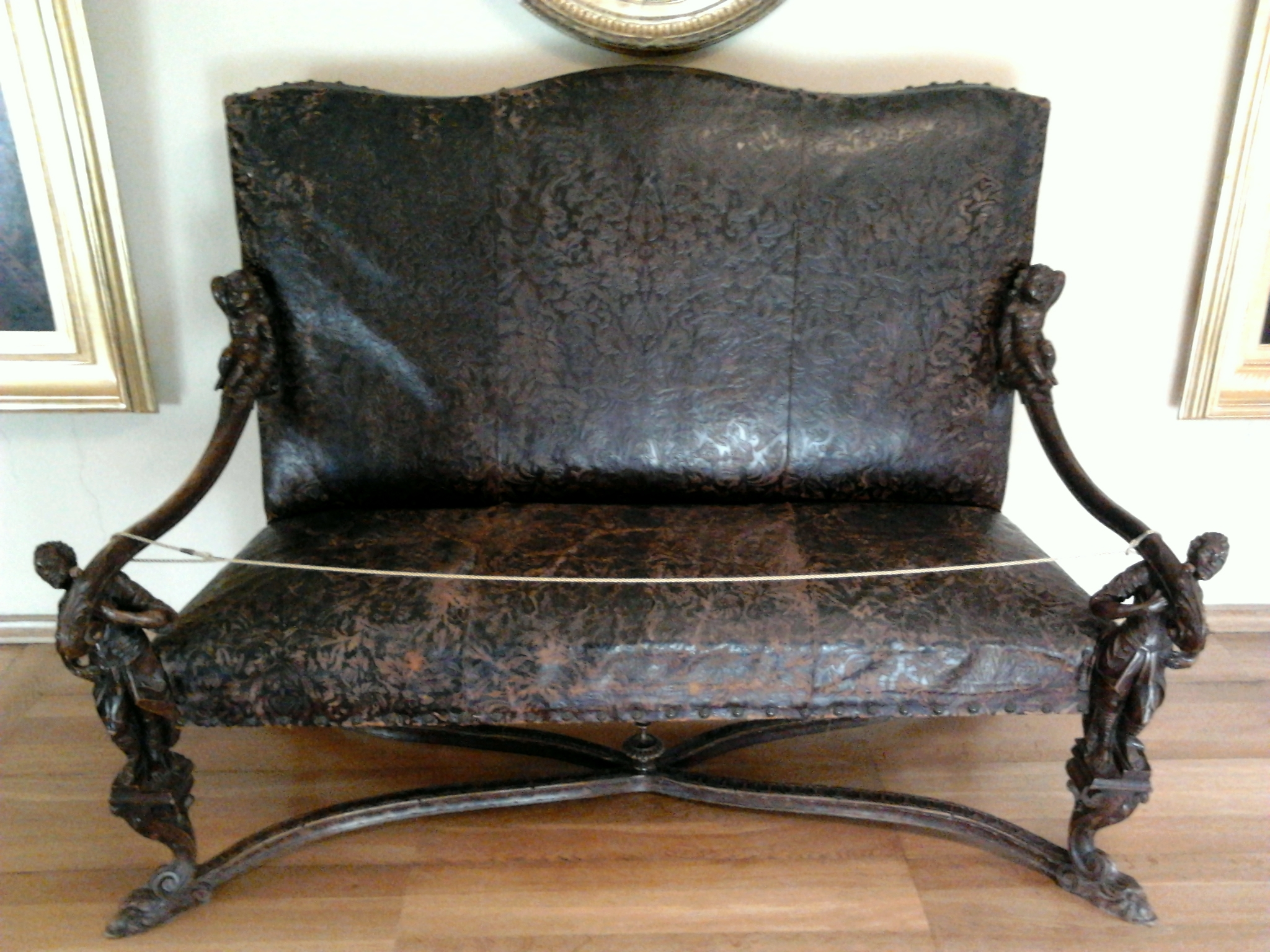
Andrea Brustolon sofa with black slaves covered with cordovan, National Museum in Warsaw

Leather wallpaper is a type of wallpaper used in various styles for wall covering. It is often referred to as wrought leather. It is often gilded, painted and decorated. Leather was used to cover and decorate sections of walls in the houses of the rich, and some public buildings. Leather is pliable and could be decorated in various ways.

Cuir de Cordoue, or cordwain or cordovan (meaning: "from Córdoba"), sometimes called gold leather (from Dutch "goudleer"), refers to painted and gilded (and often embossed) leather hangings, manufactured in panels and assembled for covering walls as an alternative to tapestry. These terms are mostly used for historical and antique materials.

== History ==
Cuir de Cordoue originated from North Africa and was introduced to Spain as early as the ninth century. In Spain such embossed leather hangings were known as guadamecí, from the Libyan town of Ghadames, while cordobanes ("cordovan") signified soft goat leather. In 1316, a Cuir de Cordoue guild existed in Barcelona. Spanish gold leather was popular until the early seventeenth century.

In the fifteenth or sixteenth century, the technique reached the Low Countries, first in Flanders and Brabant, where it was further developed. Though there were craftsmen in several cities (such as Antwerp, Brussels, and Ghent), the major handicraft center for gold leather was Mechelen, where it was mentioned as early as 1504. In the Dutch Republic gold leather-making flourished in the seventeenth century in Amsterdam, The Hague and Middelburg. In Amsterdam, at least eleven gold leather-makers were active. One of them, Hans le Maire, because of the smell, the need for water, wind and light, working at the edge of the city or in Vreeland, used up to 16,000 hides of calves and some 170,000 leaves of silver annually.

Dutch Cuir de Cordoue was exported to Germany, Denmark, Sweden, China and Japan. The last Amsterdam gold leather merchant Willem van den Heuvel closed around 1680, but the trade and production continued in Flanders and Northern France.

With the advent of printed wallpaper from about 1650, often imported from China as well as made in Europe, the far more expensive leather wallcoverings began to decline, though they continued to be used, in a rather revivalist sprit, in very luxurious homes.

Embossed wall coverings made to imitate antique embossed leather include Tynecastle, or Modeled Canvas. It was developed and patented in 1874 by designer W. Scott Morton (1840–1903). It was made by hand pressing canvas into carved wooden molds and dry it. It was colored after it was stuck to the wall.

Japanese Leather Paper imitates embossed leather. It is crafted from sheets of handmade paper pressed together. It is then embossed and gilded with the field color stenciled on it. A coat of lacquer was added to protect it and create a sheen.

During the colonial period in the United States, embossed leather panels were occasionally used as an accent, as a dado, on a screen, or above a chimney. In the last quarter of the 19th century, leather panels were revived and used in select rooms of mansions such as libraries. Introduced in the 1860s as "oil leather papers", the coverings later became known as "leather paper" and were offered in catalogs from Paul Balin in Paris' Birge in Buffalo, New York; and Jeffrey & Co. and Woollams & Co. They included embossing, gild and painted finishes designed to imitate leather wallpaper and were used to line furniture and cabinets. Their use continued in fancy homes of the late 19th and early 20th century decorating Lincrusta and Anaglypta were competing products. Leather papers were often made up of a series of paper laminates which were forced into shape with a mold, while Lincrusta is a patented composite material, and Anaglypta is a simthat were not designed to look like leather wallpaper. Rottman, Strome & Co. became a major producer based in England with manufacturing in Japan.

Since 1988, Lutson has been designing and manufacturing gilt-leather in southern France.

== Technique ==
Cuir de Cordoba was usually made of fine leather; often calf skins were used. The technique consisted of shaping panels of wet leather over wooden moulds, then painting them, then oil-gilding and lacquering them. Sometimes smooth panels of painted Cuir de Cordoue were used.

Patterns for these panels followed fashions in silk damask, at some lag in time, since the high-relief wooden moulds were laborious to make. After the second half of the 18th century, this luxurious artisan product was no longer made, its place taken in part by chintz hangings and printed wallpapers. In the eighteenth century Chinoiserie patterns were popular with Cuir de Cordoue.

== Use ==
Structures with leather wallpaper include:

- Chatsworth House
- Dyrham Park
- Ginter House
- Ham House, near London
- Djursholm Castle
- The Peacock Room, using early 16th-century leather brought to England by Catherine of Aragon, then reconstructed in London in the 1890s, now in the Freer Gallery of Art in Washington, D.C.
- Isabella Stewart Gardner Museum of Boston, Massachusetts
- Loreto Abbey at Rathfarnham
- Ehreshoven Castle
- Town Hall of Bremen (Cuir de Cordoue)
- Oranienbaum Palace
- Moritzburg Castle (painted leather wallpaper)
- Metlife Insurance Company Building boardroom

Important examples of Cuir de Cordoue can be seen in the Netherlands in the Rijksmuseum Amsterdam, the Stedelijk Museum De Lakenhal and a side chamber of the Pieterskerk, both in Leiden, the Museum Van Gijn in Dordrecht, the Maastricht town hall and the Drents Museum in Assen. In Belgium fine examples can be seen in Museum Plantin-Moretus in Antwerp, Museum Hof van Busleyden in Mechelen and Malonne Abbey (near Namur). In Germany examples of Ledertapete can be found in the Town Hall of Bremen and Moritzburg Castle (near Dresden). In Scandinavia Cuir de Cordoue can be seen in Rosenholm Castle (Denmark) and Skokloster Castle (Sweden). Baroque State Rooms of the Wawel Castle in Kraków (Poland) were covered with an early 18th-century cordovan from king Augustus III's castle at Moritzburg.

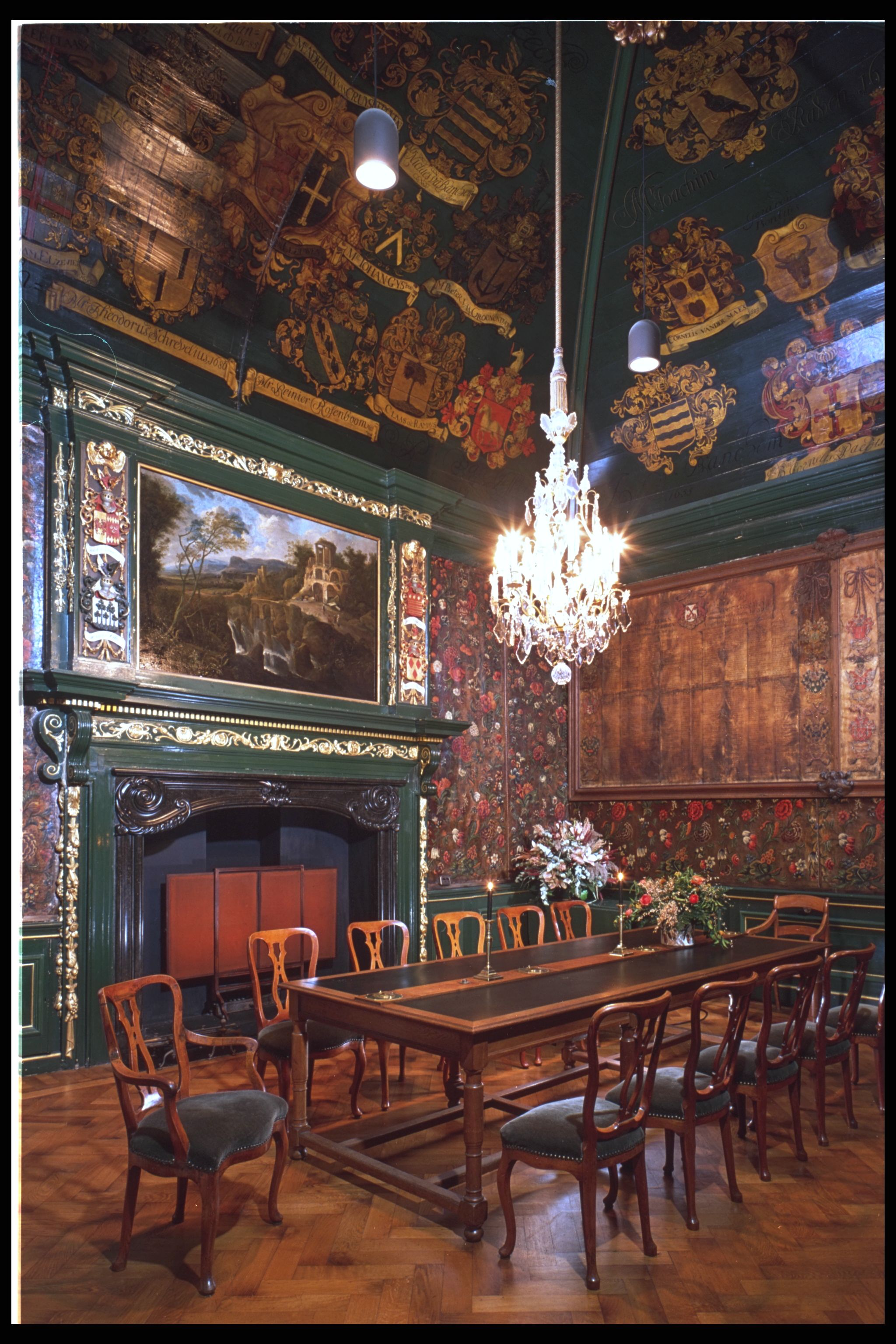
Pieterskerk, Leiden

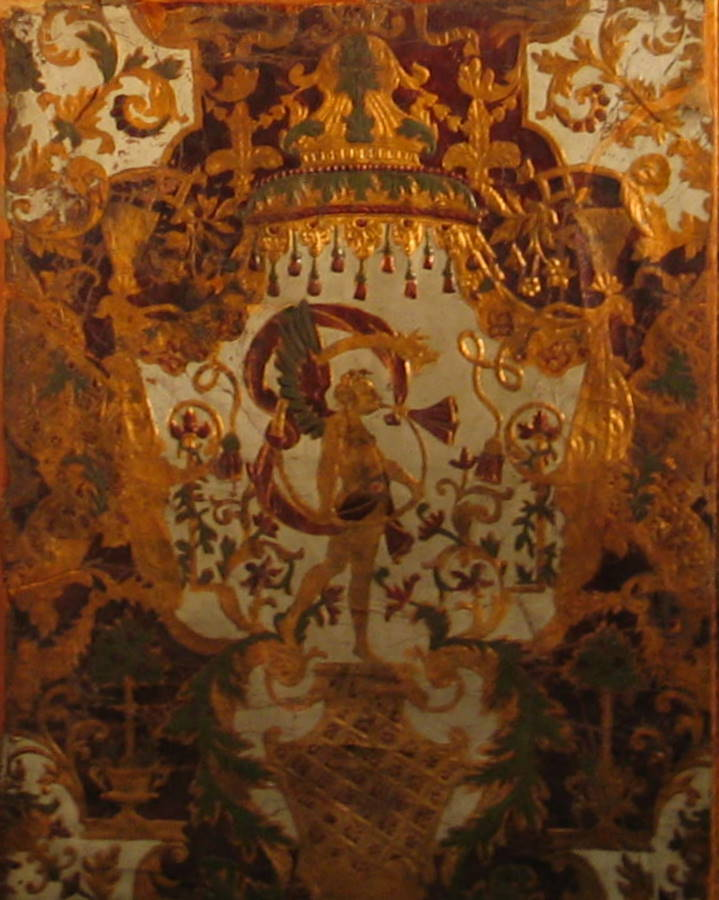
Hof van Busleyden, Mechelen

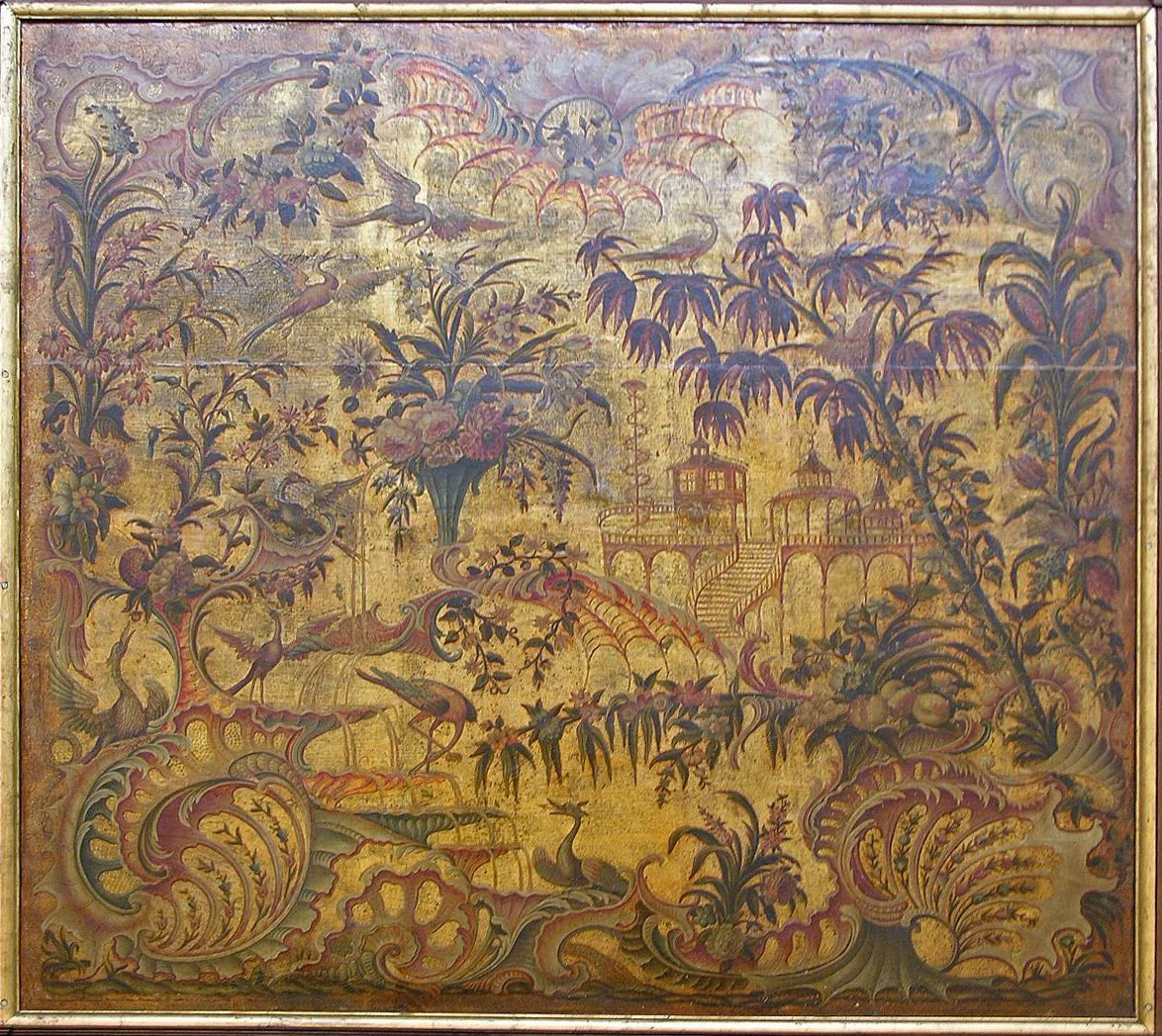
Malonne Abbey

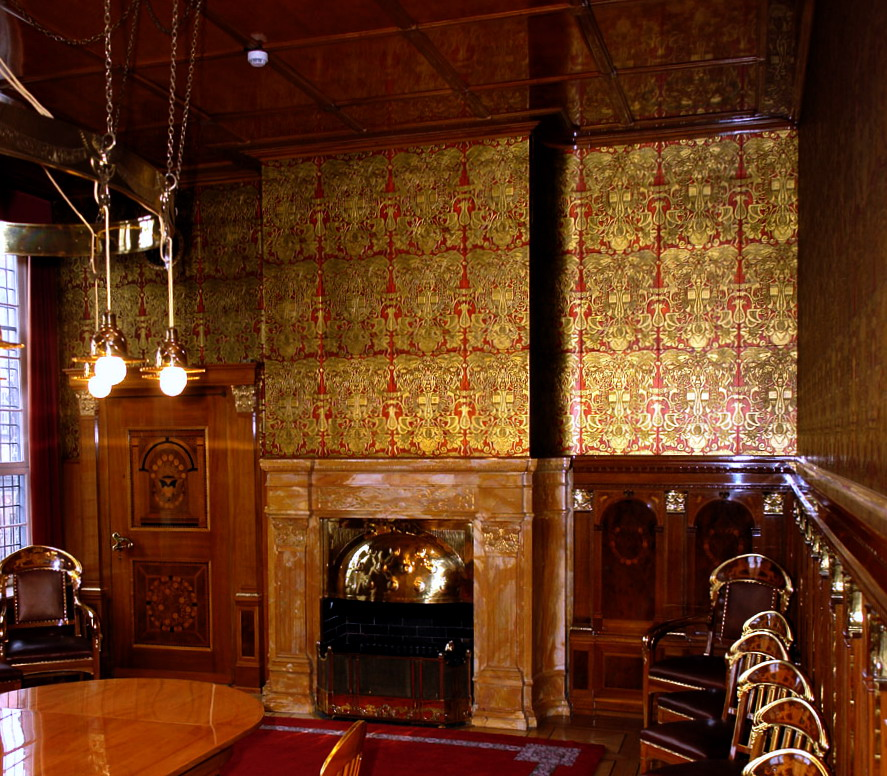
Town hall of Bremen

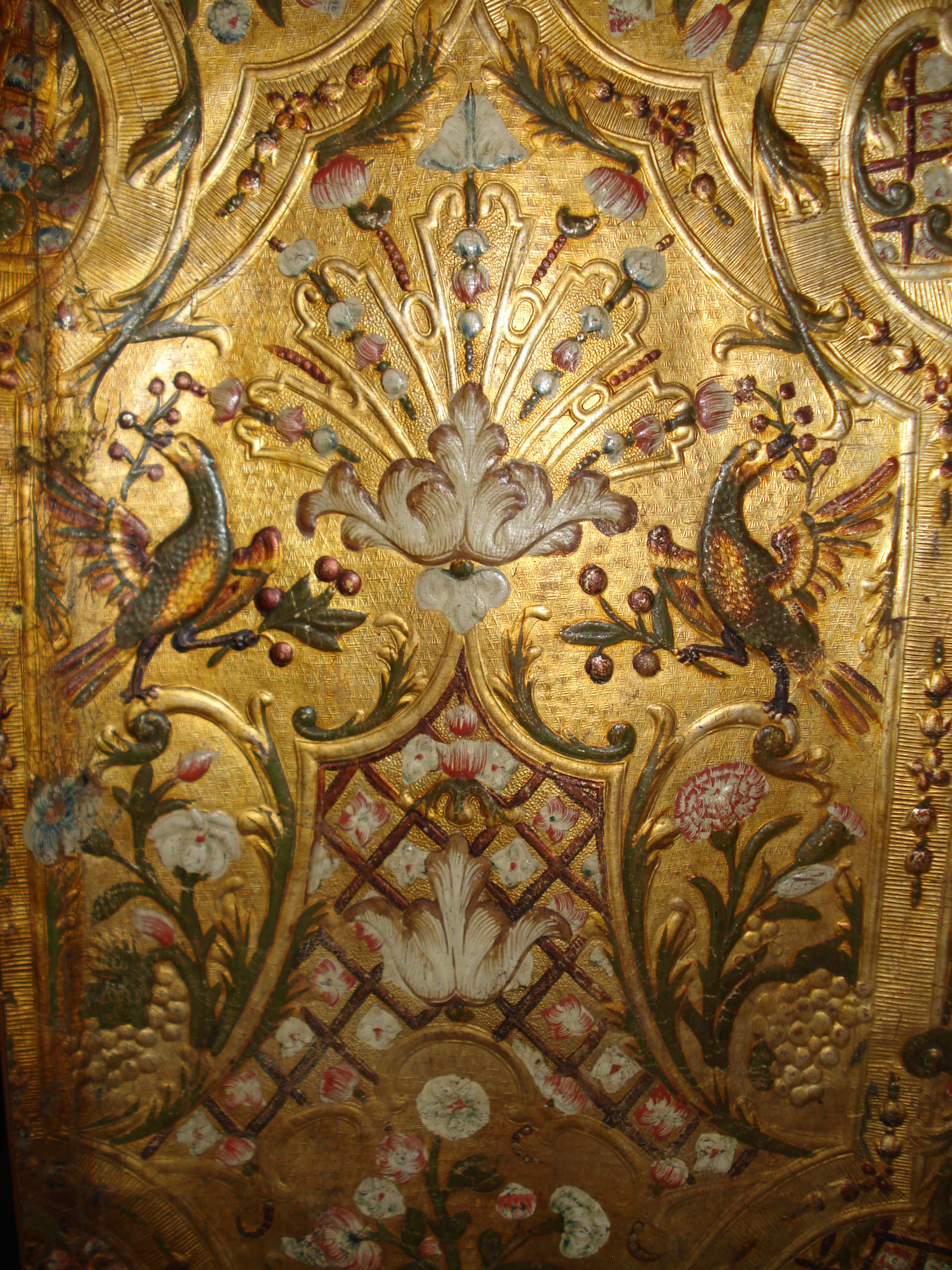
Rosenholm Castle

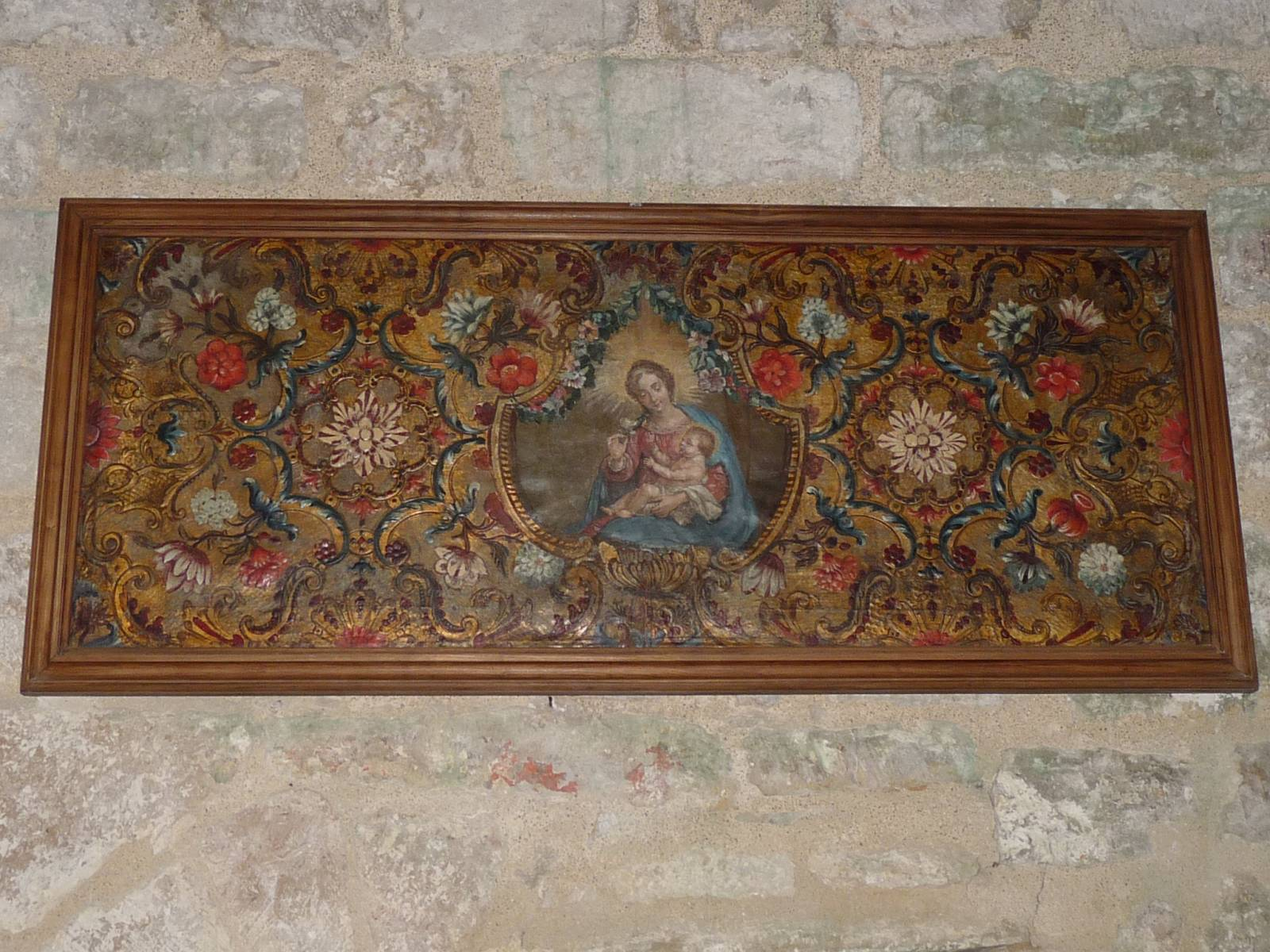
Antependium in the church of Alloue

Skokloster Castle, 17th century

== See also ==
- Anaglypta
- Flock wallpaper
- Lincrusta (Lincrusta Walton)
