= Sigrid Banér =

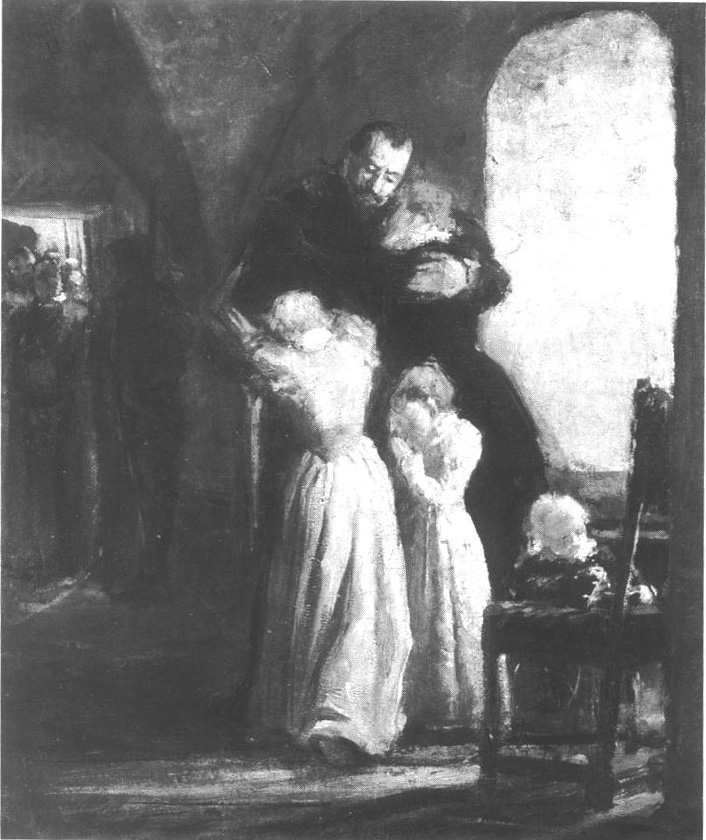
Gustaf Banér bids farewell to his family painting by Fanny Brate

Sigrid Gustafsdotter Banér (17 January 1592, Djursholm Castle - 22 October 1669), was a Swedish noble, letter writer and Scholarship founder. She is most known in history for the letters to her sister Anna, in which she describe the last days of her father Gustaf Banér, who was executed during the Linköping Bloodbath.

== Life ==
Sigrid Banér was born to Gustaf Banér and Kristina Svantesdotter Sture (1559-1619) and the sister of among others Per Gustafsson Banér and Johan Banér. She never married, and after the death of her mother, she lived with her sister Anna Gustafsdotter Banér (1585-1656) and her brother-in-law count Gabriel Bengtsson Oxenstierna (1586-1656), tutoring her nieces and nephews.

== Legacy ==
Sigrid Banér was described as an autodidact who enjoyed reading and writing. She wrote genealogical research of her family, and notes of the lives of her family members, particularly the childhood of her brothers. In 1653, she donated the income from two farms to finance scholarships for students in theology at the Uppsala University.

The street Jungfrugatan ('Maiden Street') at Östermalm and Ladugårdsgärdet in Central Stockholm, where she owned a property, is named after her.
