= Brate =

Brate is a Swedish surname. People with this surname include:

- Erik Brate (1854–1924), Swedish linguist.
- Fanny Brate (1862–1940), Swedish painter
- Cameron Brate (born 1991), American football tight end for the Tampa Bay Buccaneers
