= Cordovan leather =

Cordovan leather may refer to:

- Leather from Córdoba, Andalusia, Spain
- Cuir de Cordoue, leather wallpaper
- Shell cordovan, horse leather
