= Nils Turesson Bielke =

Swedish statesman (1569–1639)

Baron Nils Turesson Bielke
- Portrait, 1614

Governor of Estonia
- In office 1605–1605
- Preceded by: Moritz Stensson Leijonhufvud
- Succeeded by: Axel Nilsson Ryning

Governor-General of Finland
- In office 1623–1631
- Preceded by: Office created
- Succeeded by: Gabriel Oxenstierna

Personal details
- Born: 5 November 1569 Hörningsholm, Sweden
- Died: 17 December 1639 (aged 70)
- Spouse: Ingeborg Oxenstierna
- Children: Ture Bielke, Sigrid Bielke, Christina Bielke, Carin Bielke, Gustaf Bielke, Svante Bielke, Brita Bielke, Sten Bielke,
- Occupation: Statesman

Nils Turesson Bielke (5 November 1569 – 17 December 1639) was a Swedish statesman, member of the privy council, son of Ture Pedersson Bielke.

== Career ==
Nils Turesson Bielke was an ardent supporter of Duke Carl which rewarded his fidelity in 1602 when he became Kansliråd, deputy director of the kingdom. In 1605 he became governor of Tallinn and its province, in 1606 member of privy council and in 1608 judge. In addition, both he and his brother Svante Turesson Bielke were raised to rank of barons.

== Treaty of Knäred ==
He was a Swedish delegate at the peace negotiations which preceded the peace of Knäred in the 1613 after the Kalmar War.

== Judge ==
In 1614 he became assessor of Svea Court of Appeal, based in Stockholm. In 1623 first president of Turku Appellate court and the first governor-general of Finland.

== Personal life ==
In 1605 Nils Turesson Bielke married Ingeborg Oxenstierna, they had eight children:

1. Ture Bielke (1606-1648)
2. Sigrid Bielke (1607-1634) married count Åke Henriksson Tott (1598-1640)
3. Christina Bielke (1609-1609)
4. Carin Bielke (1612-1694) married in 1641 Axel Banér (1594-1642)
5. Gustaf Bielke (1618-1661)
6. Svante Bileke (1620-1645)
7. Brita Bielke (-1669) married in Stockholm Gustaf Banér (1618-1689)
8. Sten Bielke

Political offices
Preceded by Office created	Governor-General of Finland; 1623–1631	Succeeded by Gabriel Bengtsson Oxenstierna
