= Ekenäs Castle =

Swedish castle

Coordinates: 58.382°N 15.946°E

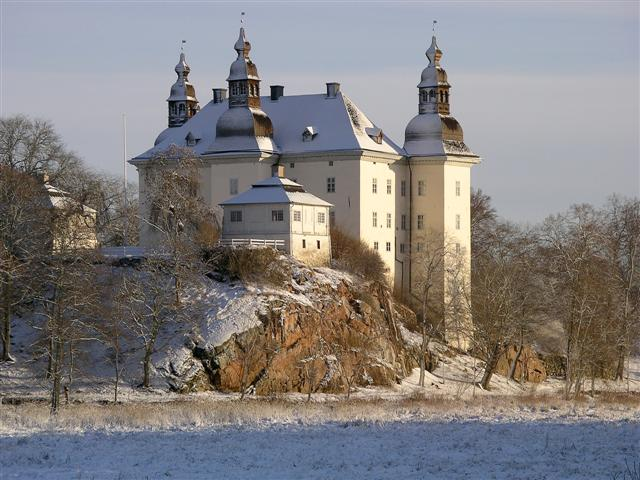
Winter scene at Ekenäs Castle, seen from North

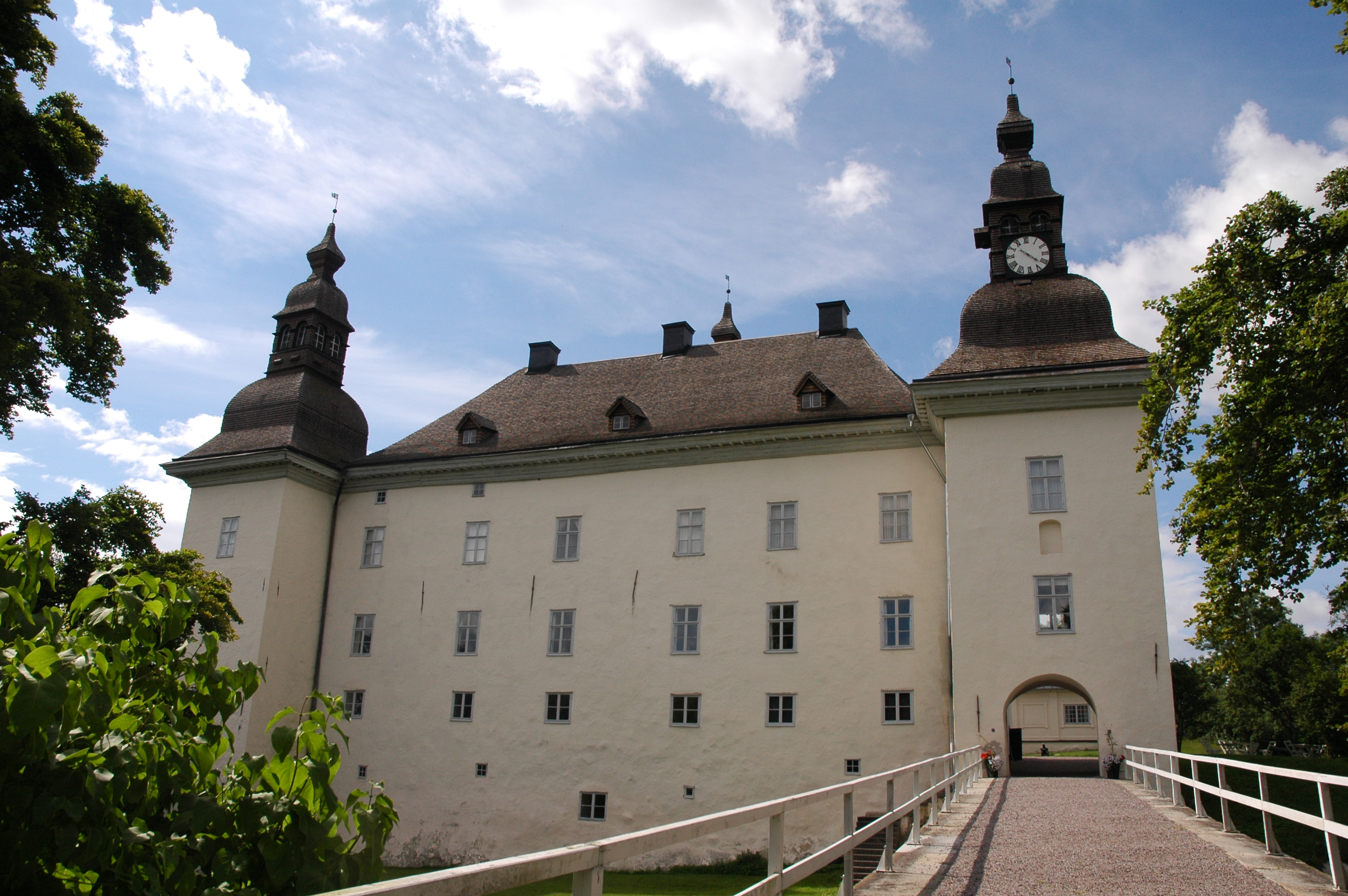
Ekenäs Castle seen from the bridge.

Ekenäs Castle (Ekenäs slott in Swedish) is a castle located outside Linköping in Linköping Municipality, Östergötland, Sweden. The present castle was built in the 17th century on top of the foundations of a medieval fortress from the 14th century. The lake surrounding the castle hill created a natural defense; however, this was drained in the late 19th century to create more arable land in the area.

== Architecture ==
The castle consists of a three-story main building with a high steep roof and three square towers featuring Baroque tower domes. With high white walls and a steep roof, the castle rises above the lake, which has receded after subsidence in the 19th century. A fixed stone bridge on the site of the former drawbridge leads up to the entrance vault, which is guarded from both sides by heavy corner towers, with chipped baroque hoods. At the castle yard is the stair tower in the middle of the house. There are also two square wings, built in the 18th century, at the castle courtyard.

== Ownership ==
The castle is, and has always been, a privately owned castle. Its ownership can be traced back to Svante Sture (1517–1567) who lived during the reign of King Erik XIV, ruler of Sweden from 1560 to 1568. When King Erik XIV ascended the throne, he set about winning the favor of influential people in the Swedish aristocracy. One of his strategies toward that end was to bestow on three of Sweden most powerful nobles the title of "count", an unprecedented move in Swedish history. One of the recipients of the title was Svante Sture. One of the first things Svante Sture did to exhibit his new-found status was built a stone house in 1592 on the site of the Ekenäs Castle.

Per Gustafsson Banér (1588–1644) rebuilt the castle in Renaissance style between 1630 and 1644. He was the son of Kristina Sture, daughter of Svante Sture. The castle was owned almost continuously by his family until 1880.

Sometime in the early 1880s, count Philip O. L. Klingspor (1845-1924) acquired the castle and its surrounding area. That marked a new era in the castle's history. The castle went from a citadel to a center of the farming and forestry businesses.

The castle's current owners are the Bergengren family, who were previously in the textile manufacturing business; they bought Ekenäs in 1939. When they took over the castle, it had had long been derelict and unused. It is the surrounding area, totaling 1,200 acres (490 ha), that is more valuable. It was this combination of rich soil and ample forests that motivated the Bergengrens to buy the castle.

== World War II ==
During World War II, the Ekenäs Castle reverted, to an extent, to its original function as a defensive fortress. The castle became the local military headquarters and supply dump during the War. After the War ended the castle fell into a state of disrepair and neglect. The castle's furnishings were pillaged continuously by locals. Respite from exploitation came for the castle in 1974, when the Swedish authorities recognized it as a site of national cultural importance. After this governmental recognition, the castle was significantly restored by its owners. Its present condition had led to its being regarded as the best-preserved renaissance castle in Sweden. The interior of the castle has been immaculately preserved, with its furnishing, decoration and carpentry dating back three centuries kept in a wonderful state.

Visitors are welcome year-round, however, the castle itself is only open during the summer. A jousting tournament and Medieval festival has been held here in May/June every year since 1993.
