= Sigrid Eskilsdotter (Banér) =

Swedish noble

- Died: 1527
- Noble family: Banér
- Spouses: Magnus Karlsson (Eka); Nils Eriksson (Gyllenstierna)
- Father: Eskil Isaksson (Banér)
- Mother: Cecilia Haraldsdotter (Gren)

Sigrid Eskilsdotter (Banér) (died 1527) was a Swedish noble, the mother of the Swedish regent Christina Gyllenstierna and the maternal grandmother of King Gustav Vasa of Sweden.

== Biography ==
Sigrid Eskilsdotter was the daughter of Eskil Isaksson (Banér) and Cecilia Haraldsdotter (Gren). She was married twice and was by 1495 twice widowed and very wealthy. Her daughter Christina was the consort of the Swedish regent from 1512 to 1520 and the leader of the Stockholm resistance against Denmark in 1520. Sigrid was present at the coronation of King Christian II in Stockholm on 4 November 1520. She was captured and imprisoned during the Stockholm Bloodbath. Sigrid and her daughter Christina were the only two women sentenced to death during the Bloodbath, but in neither case was the sentence carried out. Sigrid was sentenced to be sewn into a sack and drowned at sea, but the execution was interrupted when she agreed to bequeath all her assets to the monarch. Together with her daughters Christina and Cecilia, and her granddaughters as well as a large group of Swedish noblewomen, Sigrid was taken to Blåtårn in Denmark in 1521. Her daughter Cecilia and two of her granddaughters died in prison, but Sigrid was allowed to return to Sweden in 1523, where her grandson was now king.

== Family ==
Married, firstly, to noble councillor Magnus Karlsson (Eka) (d. between 1484 and 1487);

Issue:

1. Cecilia Månsdotter (1476–1523), mother of king Gustav Vasa

Married, secondly, to noble knight and councillor Nils Eriksson (Gyllenstierna) (d. 1495).

Issue:

1. Christina Gyllenstierna (1494–1559), regent of Sweden
