= Per Gustafsson Banér =

Swedish nobleman

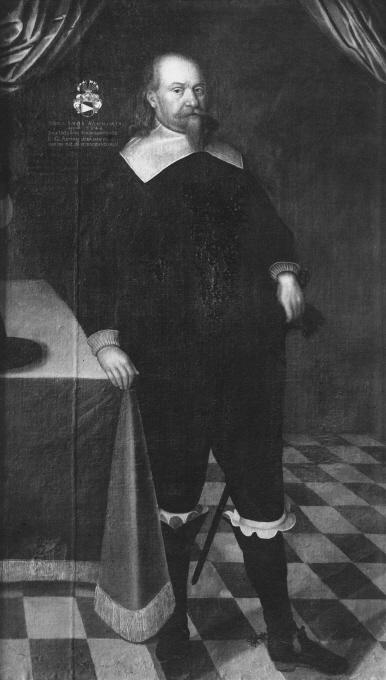
- Per Banér in 1642

Governor of Swedish Estonia
- In office 1622–1626
- Preceded by: Jacob De la Gardie
- Succeeded by: Johan De la Gardie

Personal details
- Born: June 28, 1588 Djursholm Castle, Sweden
- Died: July 13, 1644 (aged 56) Stockholm, Sweden
- Spouse(s): Hebbla Fleming (m. 1615–39; her death)
- Children: Gustaf Persson Banér

Per Gustafsson Banér, also known as Peder Gustafsson Banér (28 June 1588 – 13 July 1644) was a Swedish nobleman and member of the Privy Council of Sweden.

Banér was the son of Gustaf Banér who was one of the noblemen executed in 1600 at the Linköping Bloodbath, and Kristina Sture, daughter of Svante Stensson Sture.

He became a kammarjunkare to king Gustavus Adolphus in 1611, and followed the king on his incursion into Skåne in 1612. At the Battle of Vittsjö, Banér helped save the king from drowning, and the grateful king made him a chamberlain and conferred on him the estates of Banér's uncle Sten Axelsson Banér, who had also been executed at the Linköping bloodbath. In 1617, when Gustavus Adolphus was crowned, Banér was knighted.

He married Hebbla Fleming in 1615. Their son Gustaf Persson Banér was born in 1618. Hebbla Fleming died in 1639.

From 1622 to 1624, Banér was governor of Estonia and in 1625 he was made a member of the Privy Council. He was Lawspeaker for Öland and Östergötland from 1627.

His estate included Ekenäs Castle, which he rebuilt into a Renaissance style castle between 1630 and 1644.

Banér served under Axel Oxenstierna and acted as Oxenstierna's deputy when the latter assisted Gustavus Adolphus in Germany during the Thirty Years' War. Oxenstierna was however not entirely satisfied with Banér, who was often ill and suffered from bouts of melancholia, and did not act with sufficient force to please his superiors.

On 20 June 1644, Banér was suddenly taken ill with a fever, and he died three weeks later, on 13 July. He was buried in Riddarholmskyrkan.
