= Fasterna Church =

Lutheran church in Sweden

Coordinates: 59°46′10″N 18°14′27″E

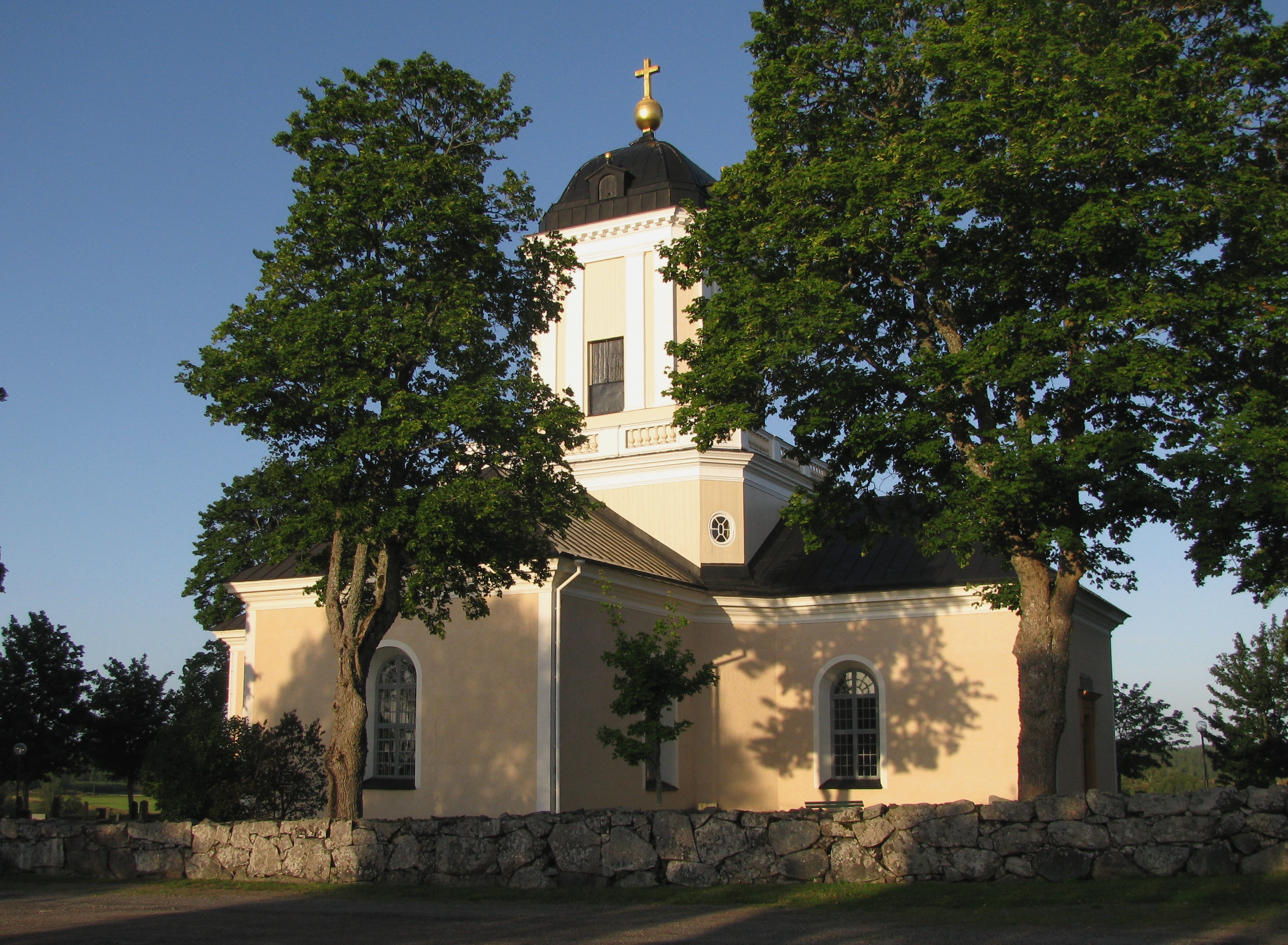
Fasterna Church, external view

Fasterna Church (Swedish: Fasterna kyrka) is a Lutheran church in the Archdiocese of Uppsala in Stockholm County, Sweden.

== History and architecture ==
Fasterna Church is built on the remains of an earlier medieval church, which was considered to have become too small by the late 18th century. The lord of the nearby Rånäs Manor, Jean Le Febure, pushed strongly for the idea that the old church should be demolished and a new one built. He personally paid for the demolition and subsequent reconstruction of the church with his own money. The church is modelled after Adolf Fredrik Church in Stockholm, and neo-classical in style. The architect was Johan Neosander, who designed the church with the aid of Olof Tempelman. Construction started in 1797 and the church was inaugurated in 1806.
