= Paul Balin =

French wallpaper designer and manufacturer

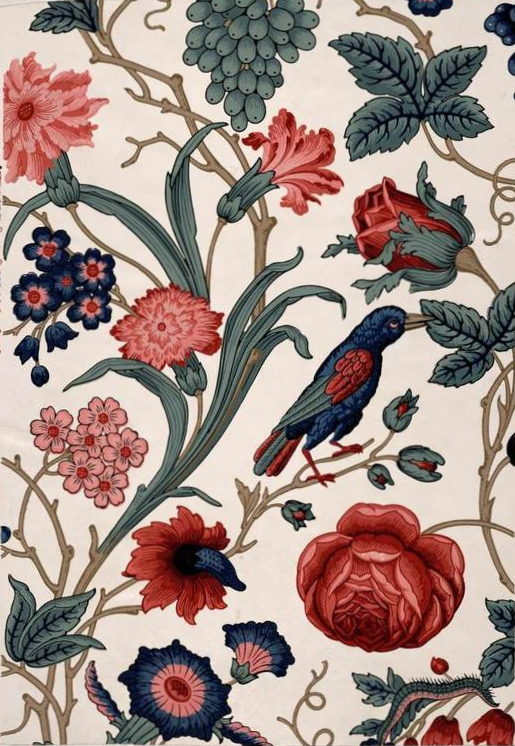
Circa 1869 wallpaper design by Paul Balin.

Paul Balin (1832–1898) was a French wallpaper designer and manufacturer. Balin was active as a wallpaper manufacturer in Paris during second half of the 19th century.

Balin was born in Paris in 1832. In 1863 he assumed ownership of the Genoux company in Paris. He received awards for his company's wallpapers at the Paris Exhibition of 1867, and at the 1873 Vienna World's Fair. Balin was featured multiple times in The Decorator and Furnisher in 1890 for productions of decorative wallpapers.

Balin held a dozen patents related to the embossing of wallpaper, which he registered between 1866 and 1884. Between 1876 and 1885 he launched numerous patent infringement lawsuits against his competitors.

Examples of his work are found in the collections of the Museum of Fine Arts Houston, the Victoria and Albert Museum, London, and the Musée des Arts Décoratifs, Paris.

== Gallery ==
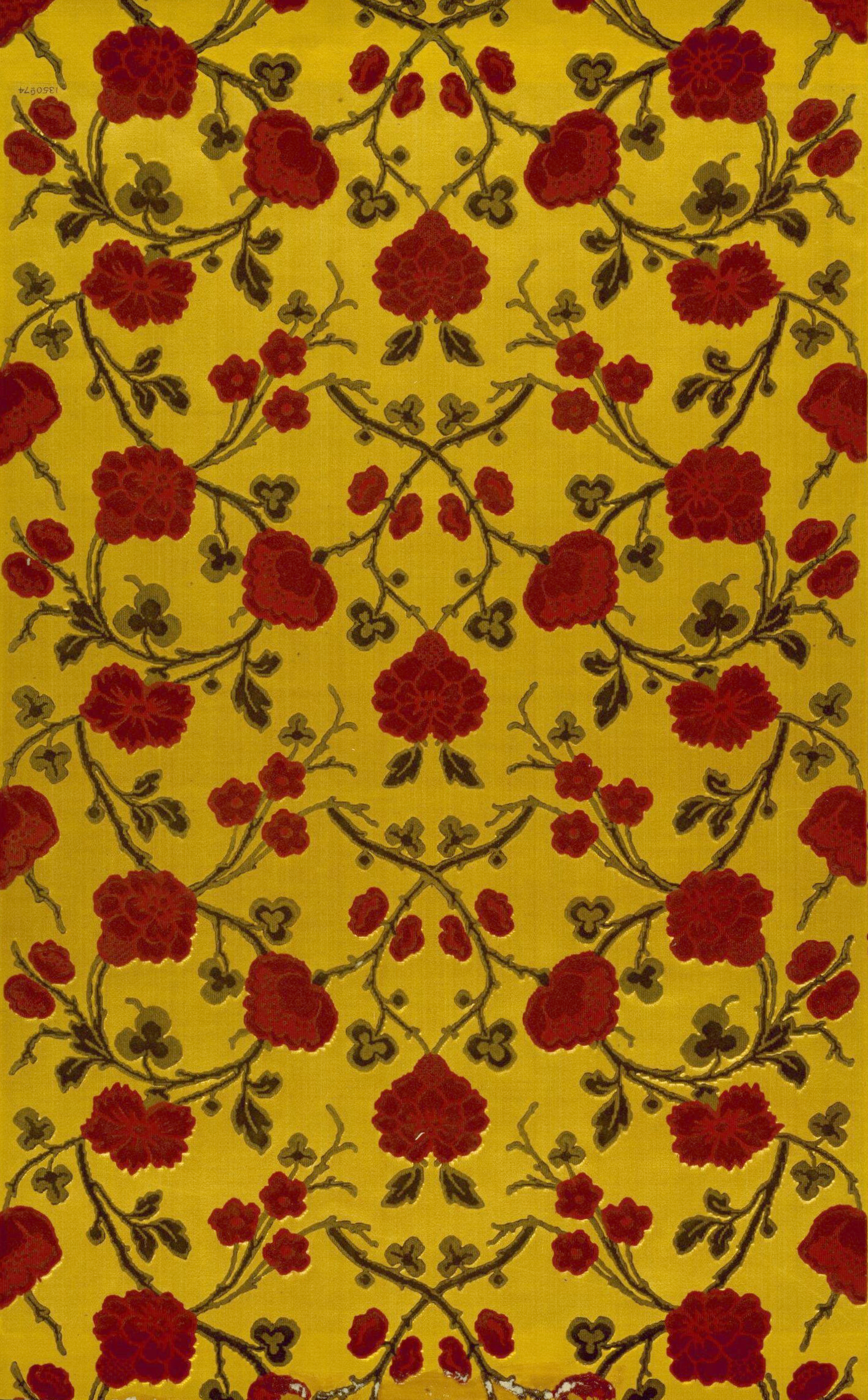
Wallpaper design by Paul Balin, circa 1850-–1873.

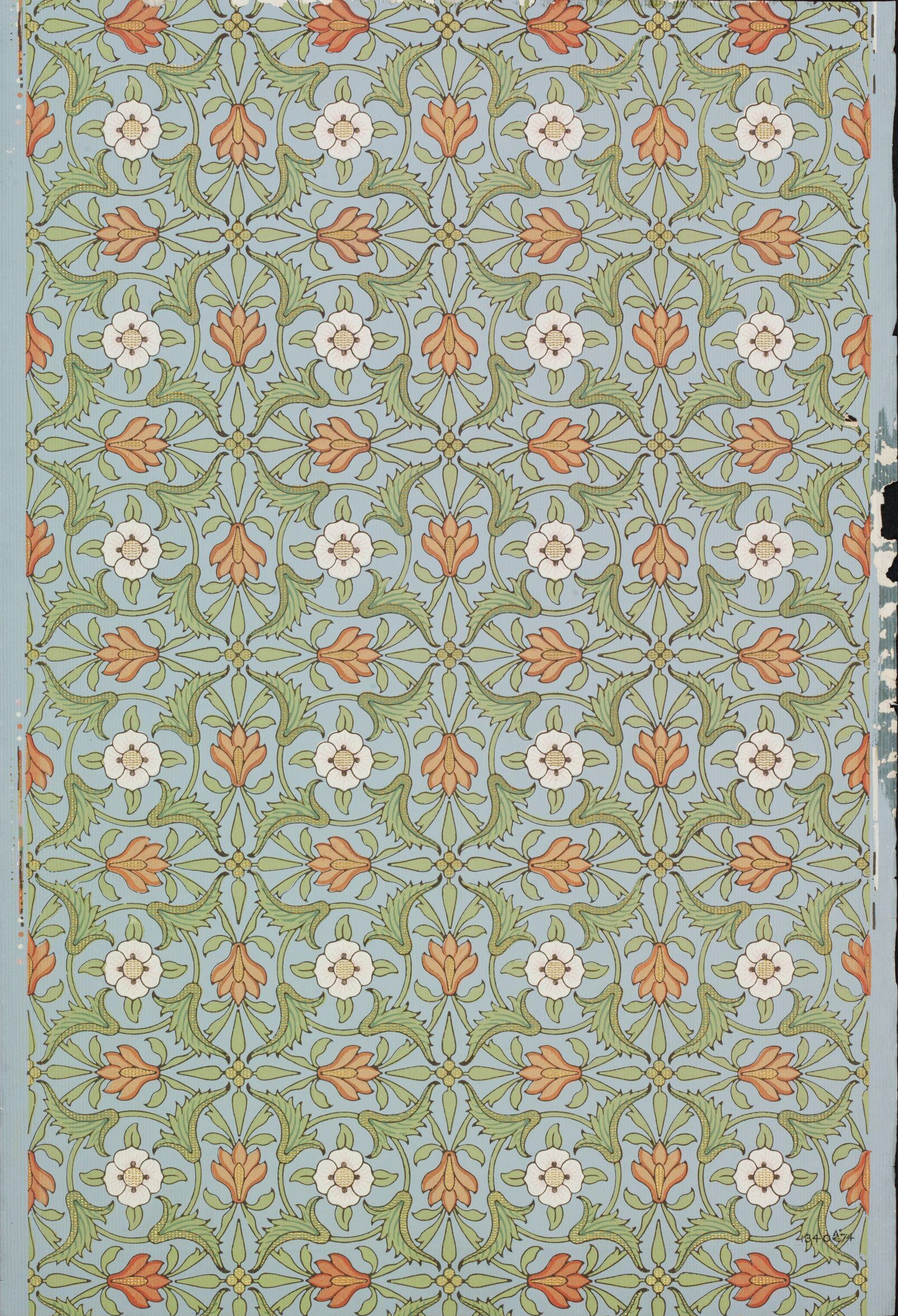
Wallpaper design by Paul Balin, circa 1850-–1873.

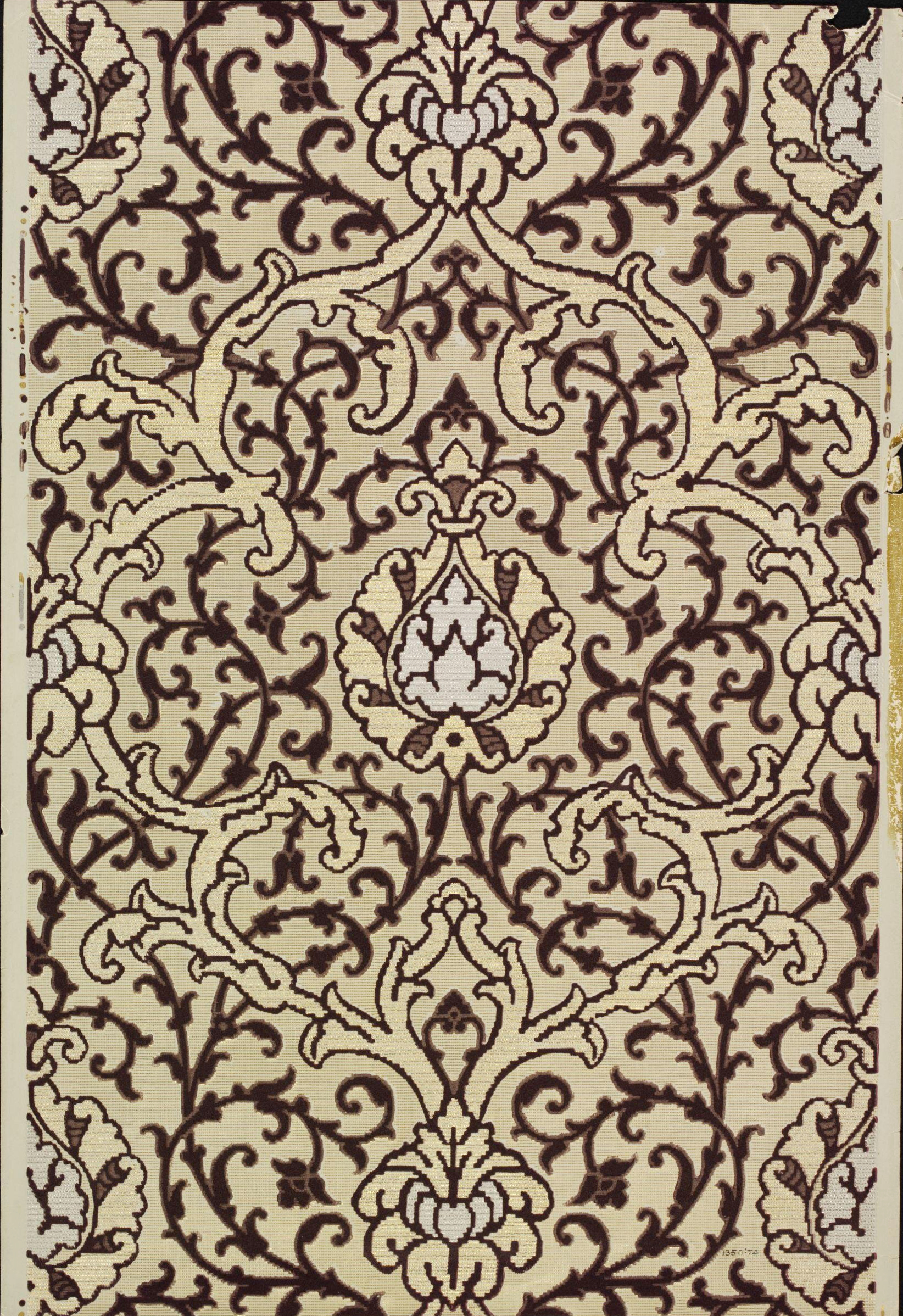
Wallpaper design by Paul Balin, circa 1850–1973.

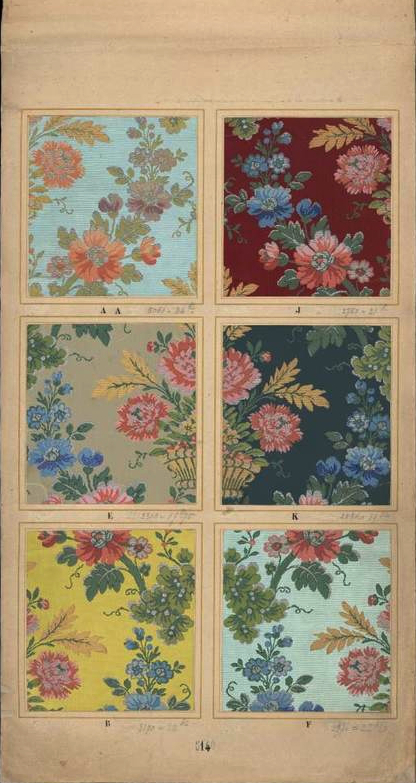
Page of the wallpaper sample portfolio presented by Paul Balin at the Vienna World's fair, 1873.

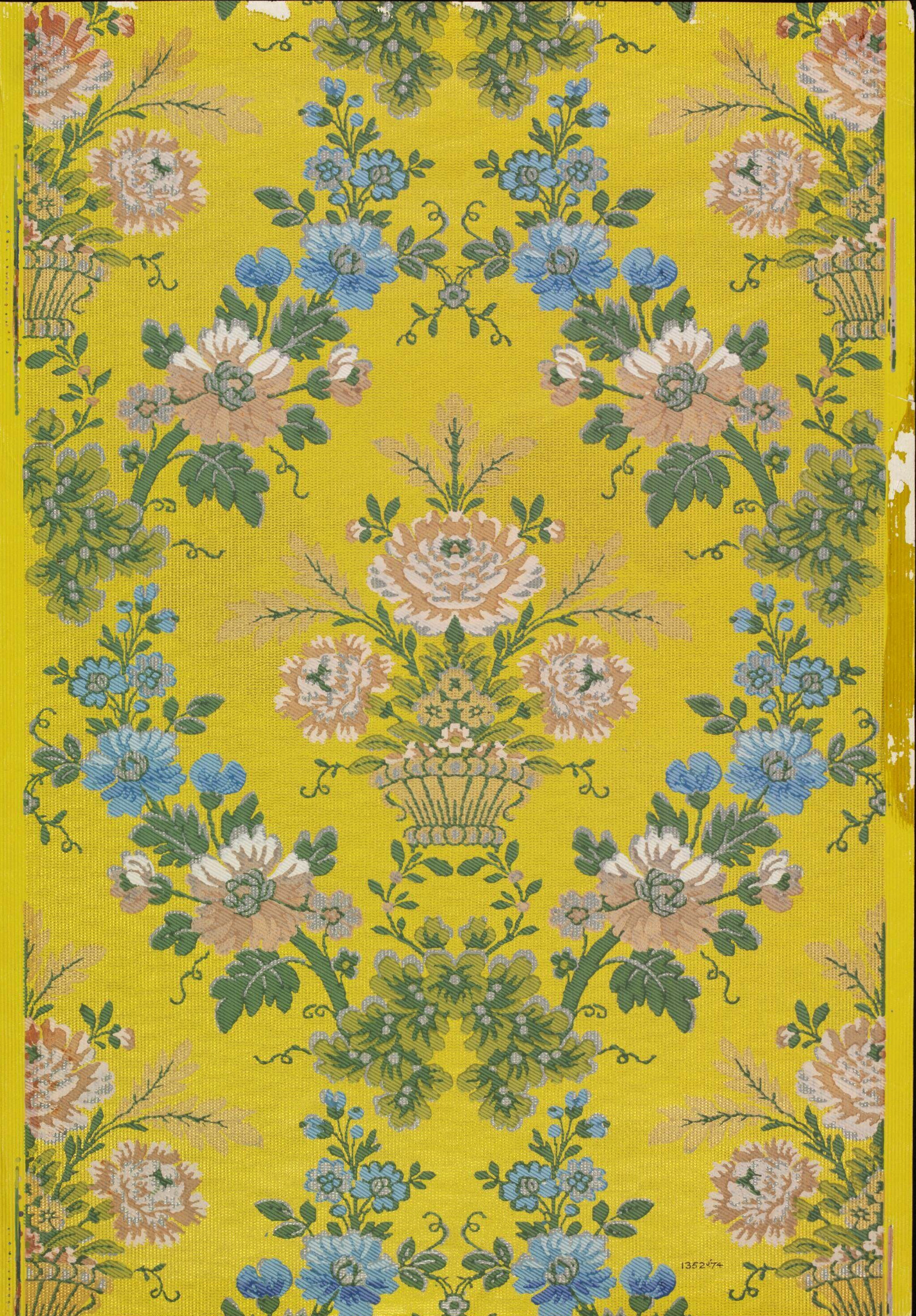
Wallpaper design by Paul Balin, circa 1850–1973.
