= Lincrusta =

19th century wall covering

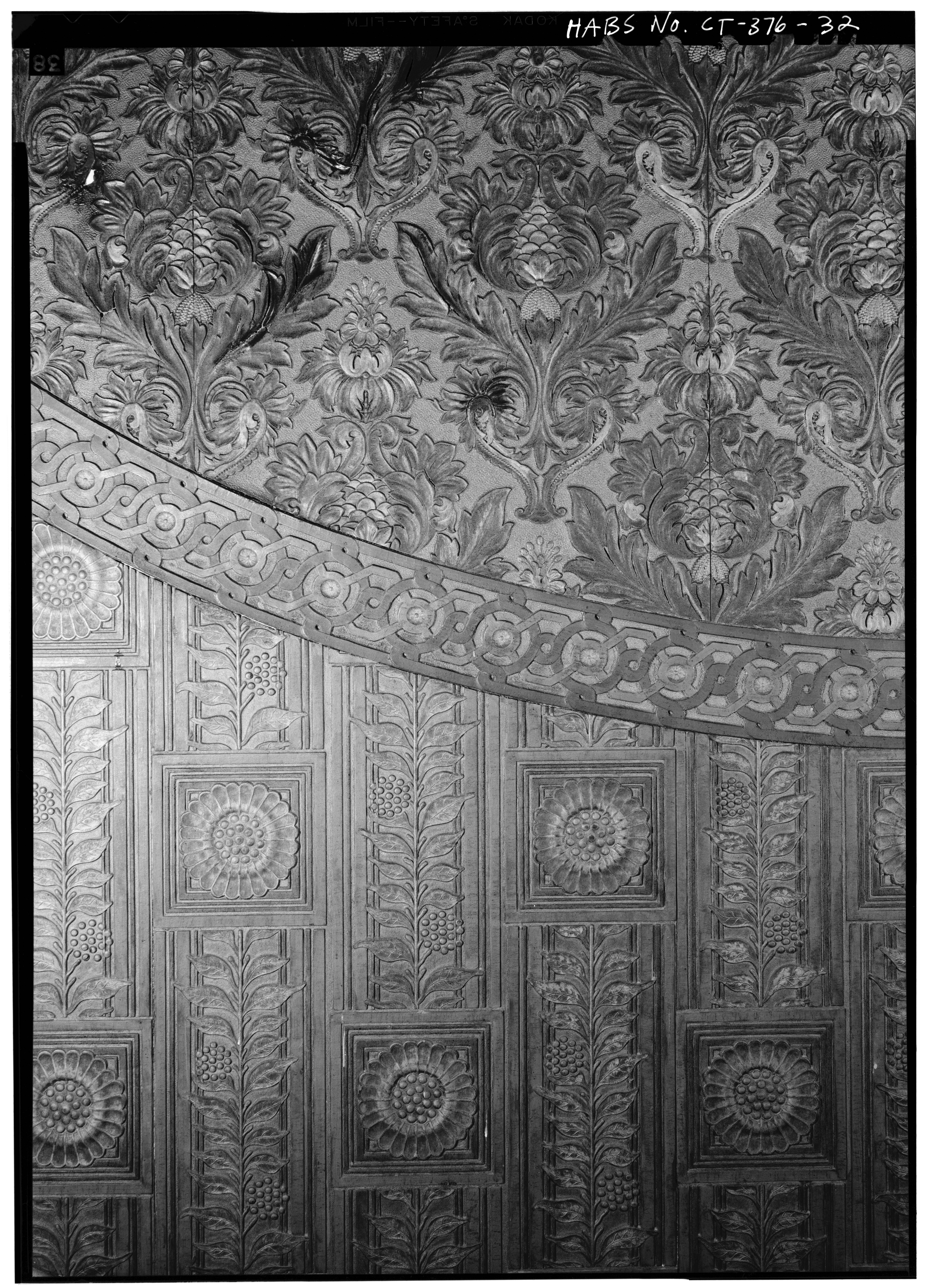
Lincrusta wall covering, Roseland Cottage

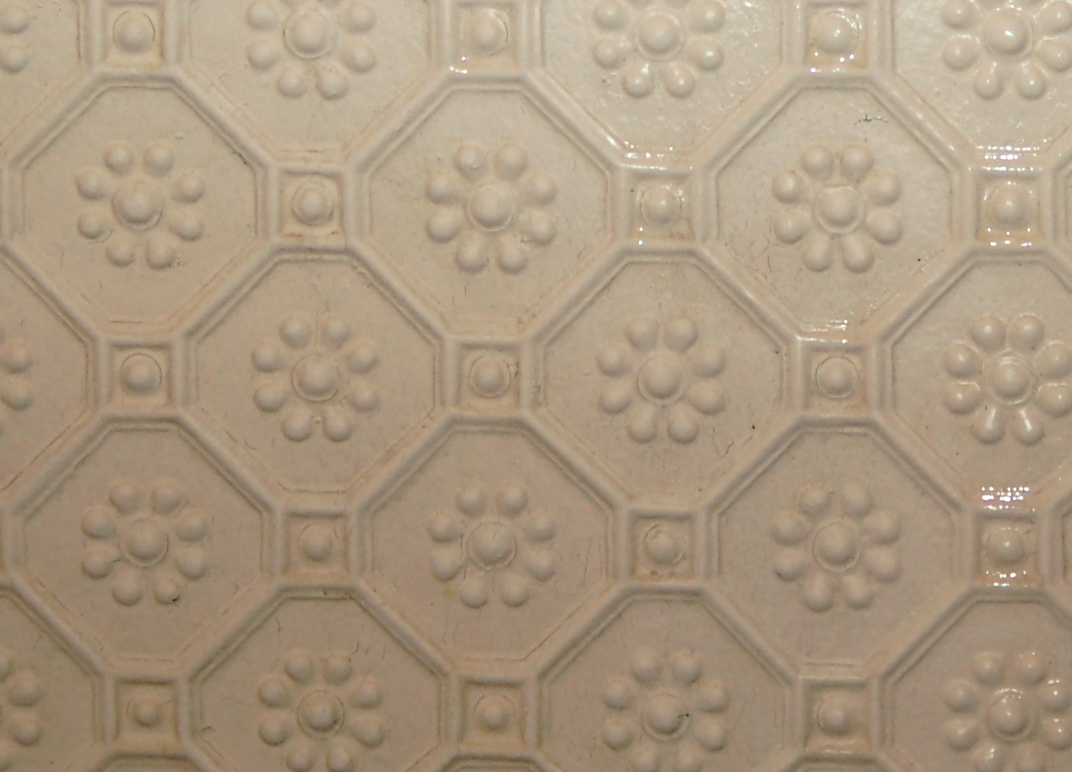
Detail of Byzantine pattern Lincrusta wall covering

Lincrusta is a deeply embossed wallcovering, invented by Frederick Walton. Walton was already known for patenting linoleum floor covering in 1860. Lincrusta was launched in 1877 and was used in a host of applications from royal homes to railway carriages. Many examples over a hundred years old can still be found throughout the world.

Commonly found in Victorian properties and restoration projects, Lincrusta is also frequently used in commercial projects such as hotel foyers, bars, restaurants and casinos. Notable installations included six staterooms on the Titanic, and in the United States the White House, the Winchester Mystery House and Roseland Cottage in Woodstock, Connecticut, where it has been completely restored and is on view to the public.

== History ==
Lincrusta was originally manufactured in Sunbury-on-Thames until 1918 when the manufacturing was moved to Darwen, Lancashire. The first production of Lincrusta in the United States was in 1883 in Stamford, Connecticut. There were also factories built in 1880 at Pierrefitte, France, and by 1889 in Hannover, Germany, and by 1898 in Milan by Linoleum Compani Milan.

Lincrusta is now produced in Morecambe, Lancashire using traditional methods. Heritage Wallcoverings Ltd acquired the Lincrusta operating assets in July 2014.

== Production and characteristics ==
Lincrusta is made from a paste of gelled linseed oil and other natural ingredients spread onto a paper base. It is then rolled between steel rollers, one of which has a pattern embossed upon it. The linseed gel continues to dry for many years and the surface gets harder. Oil-based and water-based paints can be applied to Lincrusta, providing a base for effects from simple colour washes or marbling, scumbling, and glazing, to more elaborate gilding and vert de mer treatments.

== See also ==
- Anaglypta – alternative embossed wall-covering
