= Erik Brate =

Swedish linguist and runologist (1857–1924)

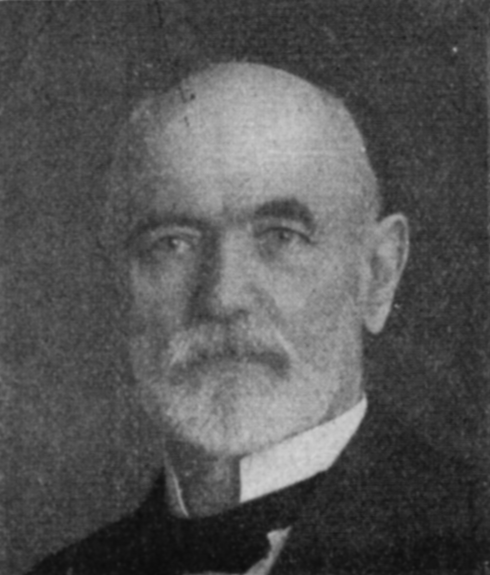
Erik Brate

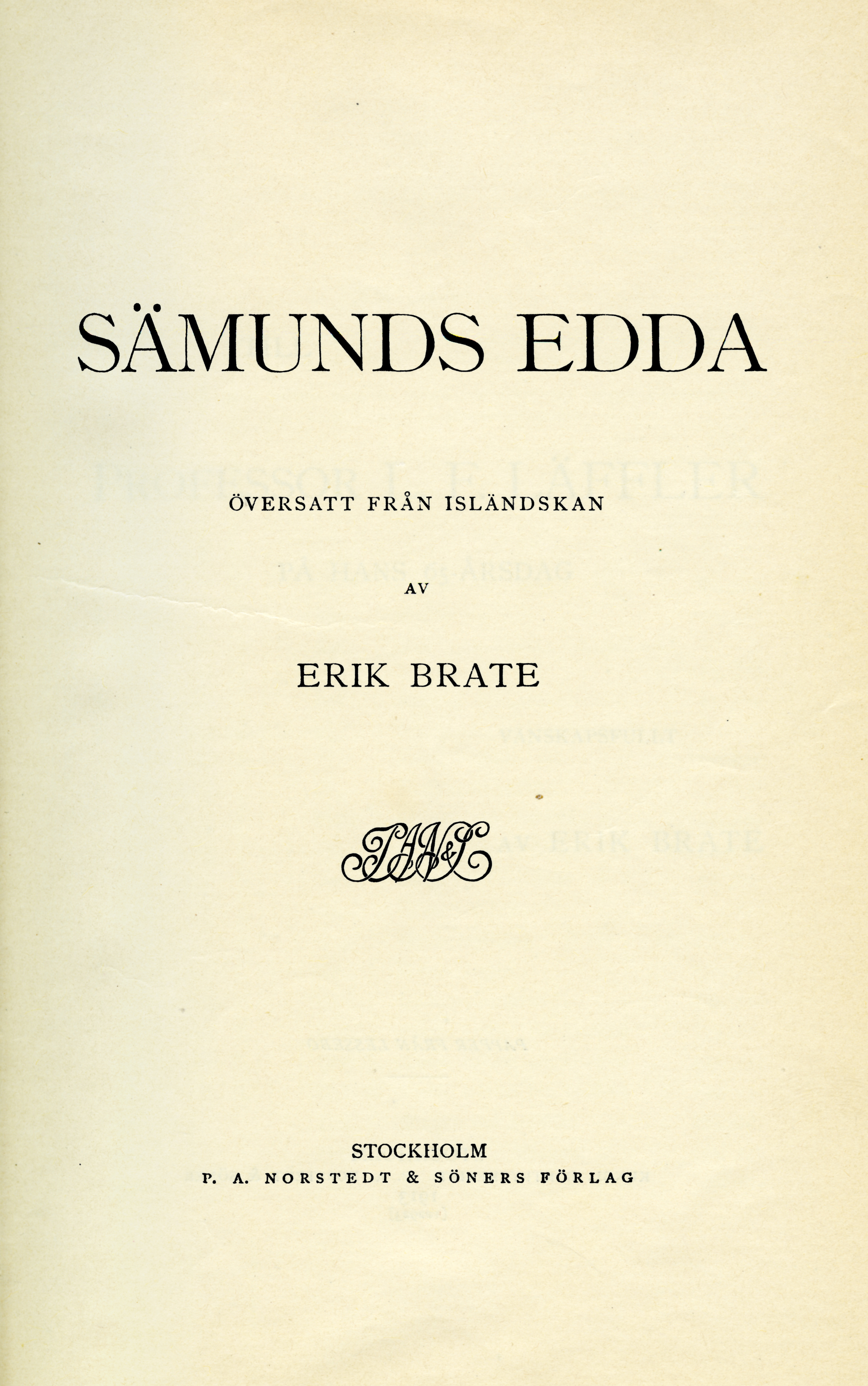
Title page of Sämunds Edda (1913), the first edition of Erik Brate's translation of the Poetic Edda.

Erik Brate (13 June 1857 – 11 April 1924) was a Swedish linguist and runologist.

== Biography ==
Brate was born in 1857 in Norberg, Västmanland County. In 1887 he married the Swedish painter Fanny Brate, née Ekbom (1861–1940). They had four daughters; Astrid (1888–1929), Torun (1891–1993), Ragnhild (1892–1894) and Ingegerd (1899–1952).

Brate became a student in Uppsala University in 1876, studied the ancient Germanic languages and Sanskrit at the University of Strasbourg from 1882 to 1883. He received his doctorate at Uppsala in 1884 with his thesis Nordische Lehnwörter im Orrmulum, which described the use of Scandinavian loanwords in the twelfth-century Middle English work Ormulum. Brate in that same year was appointed docent of ancient Germanic languages. He was appointed in 1887 to senior lecturer in Swedish and German language at the Södermalm higher general secondary school in Stockholm, where he remained to 1922.

Brate was one of Sweden's most prolific runologists. His works include, with Sophus Bugge, the first several provincial editions of Sveriges Runinskrifter. He also was responsible for the photographic documentation of many of Sweden's runestones in the late 1890s and 1900s.

Brate died in 1924 in Stockholm.
