= Anaglypta =

Brand of embossed wall covering

Anaglypta is a range of paintable textured wallcoverings made from paper or vinyl. It is produced on traditional paper and paste-the-wall substrates. Anaglypta is often compared to Lincrusta which is made from gelled paste of linseed oil and wood flour. Lincrusta is considered to be a heavier version but more durable than Anaglypta.

== History ==
The development of Anaglypta can be traced back to the invention of Lincrusta in 1877 by Frederick Walton. It became an instant success because it was the first washable wallcovering and appealed to the Victorians because of its sanitary properties as well as its durability and ornate effects. Originally made on a linen backing it was, however, quite rigid. Because of this, an employee called Thomas John Palmer invented a similar product which, being made from wood pulp and cotton, was lighter and more flexible. This was to become Anaglypta, from the Greek words ἀνα- (ana-, 'raised') and γλυπτά (glypta, 'cameo').

Seeing this as a threat to Lincrusta, Walton decided not to develop it; Palmer patented the product, parted from Walton, and moved to Lancaster. There he began production of Anaglypta in partnership with Storey Bros. in 1887. The partnership was ordered to be dissolved in 1893 by the courts, following a dispute concerning profit sharing.

== Merger ==
Anaglypta and Lincrusta came together again in 1931 when they were merged to form the Relief Decorations branch of Wallpaper Manufacturers (WPM) and manufactured in Darwen, Lancashire. After a period of stability, Relief Decorations was sold to Reed International in the 1960s and with considerable investment, the first duplex product made entirely of wood pulp was launched; this is now marketed as Anaglypta Original.

Currently, the Anaglypta brand is manufactured by Retford Wallcoverings Limited.

== See also ==
- Wallpaper
