= Gustaf Banér =

Swedish nobleman (1547–1600)

Gustaf Axelsson Banér
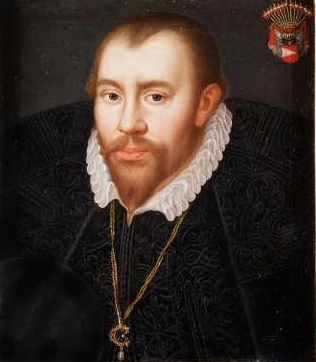
- Born: 19 May 1547
- Died: 20 March 1600 (aged 52)
- Spouse: Kristina Svantesdotter Sture (m. 1581–1600; his death)
- Children: 14
- Parent(s): Axel Nilsson Banér; Margareta Pedersdotter Bielke

Gustaf Banér (May 19, 1547 – March 20, 1600) was a Swedish nobleman who served as a member of the Privy Council of Sweden.

== Life ==
Gustaf Axelsson Banér was born at Djursholm Castle, the son of the Privy Counselor Axel Nilsson Banér and Margareta Pedersdotter Bielke. Gustaf Banér studied at the University of Rostock, took part in the insurgency against King Eric XIV and was appointed as a member of the Privy Council in 1569 by King John III. He was implicated in the Mornay plot but not investigated for it.

He remained favoured by John III for a long time and was entrusted with several diplomatic missions, such as the 1587 royal election in Poland, in which John III's son Sigismund III was elected king.

He was a stadtholder in Reval between 1588 and 1590, where there was a meeting in 1589 during which there was a rupture between Banér and the members of the Privy Council on the one side and John III on the other.

In 1592, when Sigismund III succeeded John III as King of Sweden, Banér initially supported Duke Charles in his power struggle against Sigismund. Banér's ambition was to ensure more power for the high nobility in the government. When the duke's actions had led to a rupture with most of the members of the Privy Council, Banér escaped to Denmark, from where he tried to incite a Swedish rebellion.

He joined King Sigismund III upon his arrival in Sweden in 1598, but after the Battle of Stångebro, Banér was handed over to King Charles. Banér was one of five noblemen sentenced to death and executed in Linköping. This event, which took place in the main square of Linköping on March 20, 1600, became known as the Linköping Bloodbath.

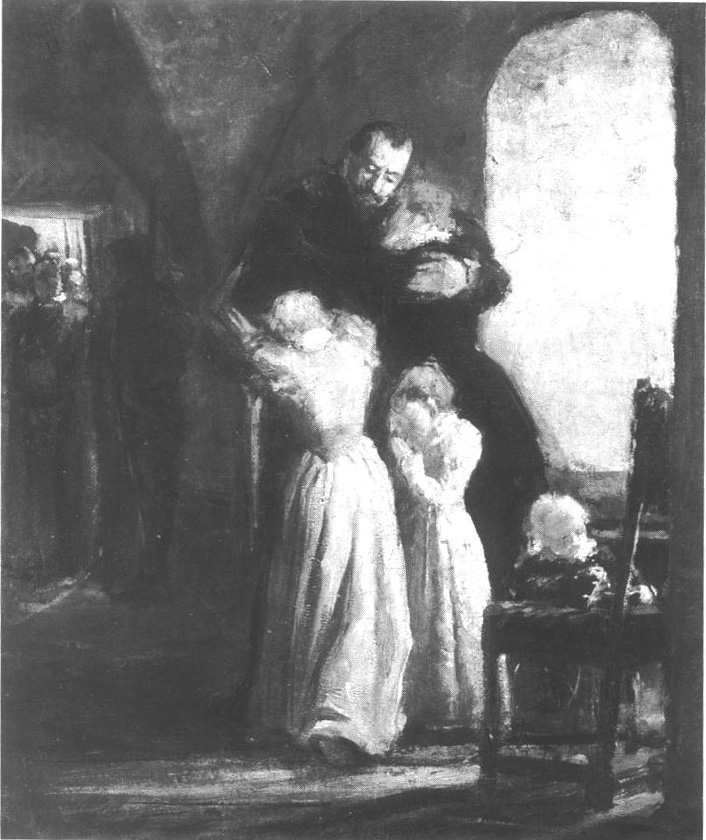
Gustaf Banér bids farewell to his family, Fanny Brate

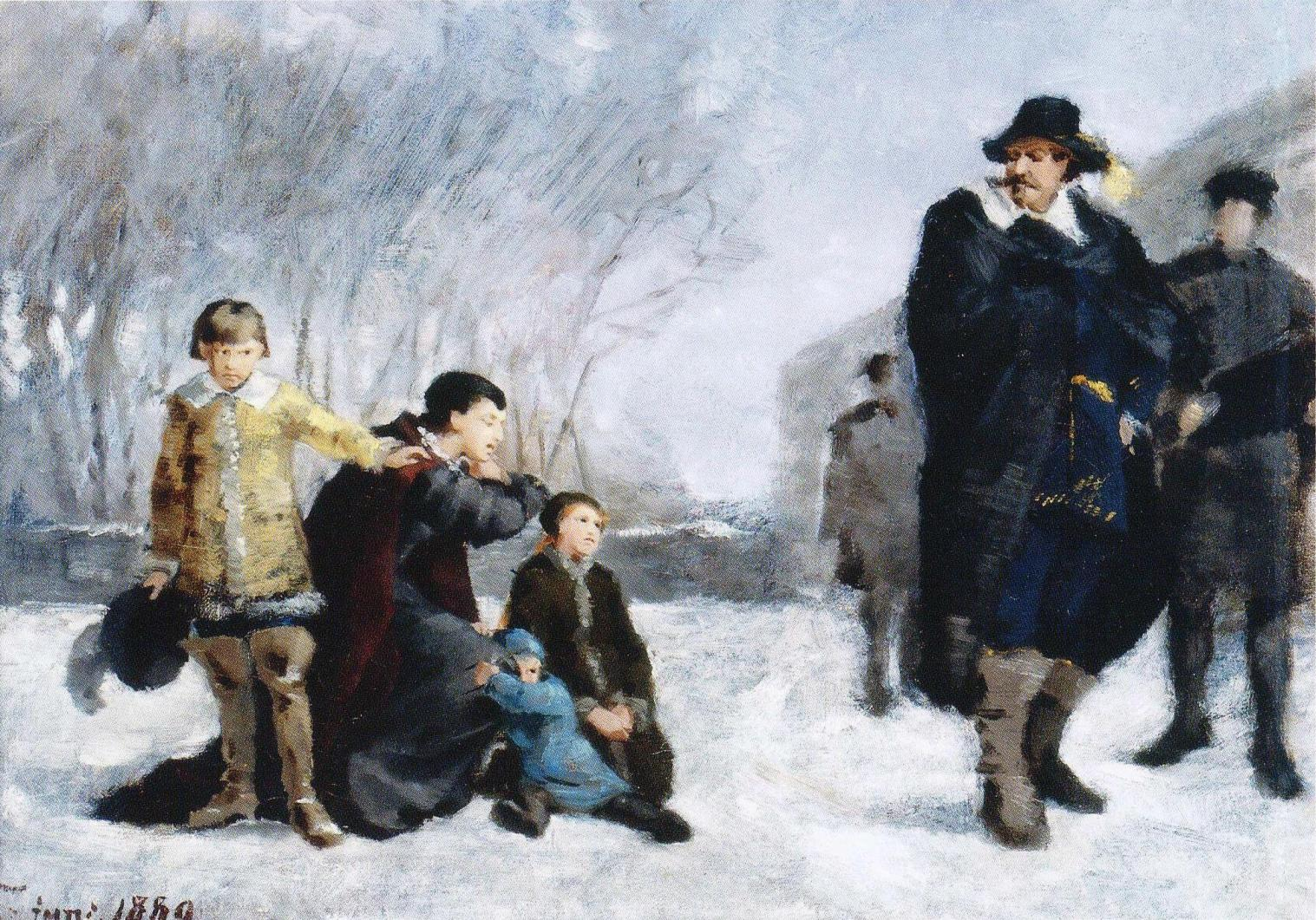
Kristina Banér Pleads for Her Husband, Helene Schjerfbeck, 1882, Charles IX on the right

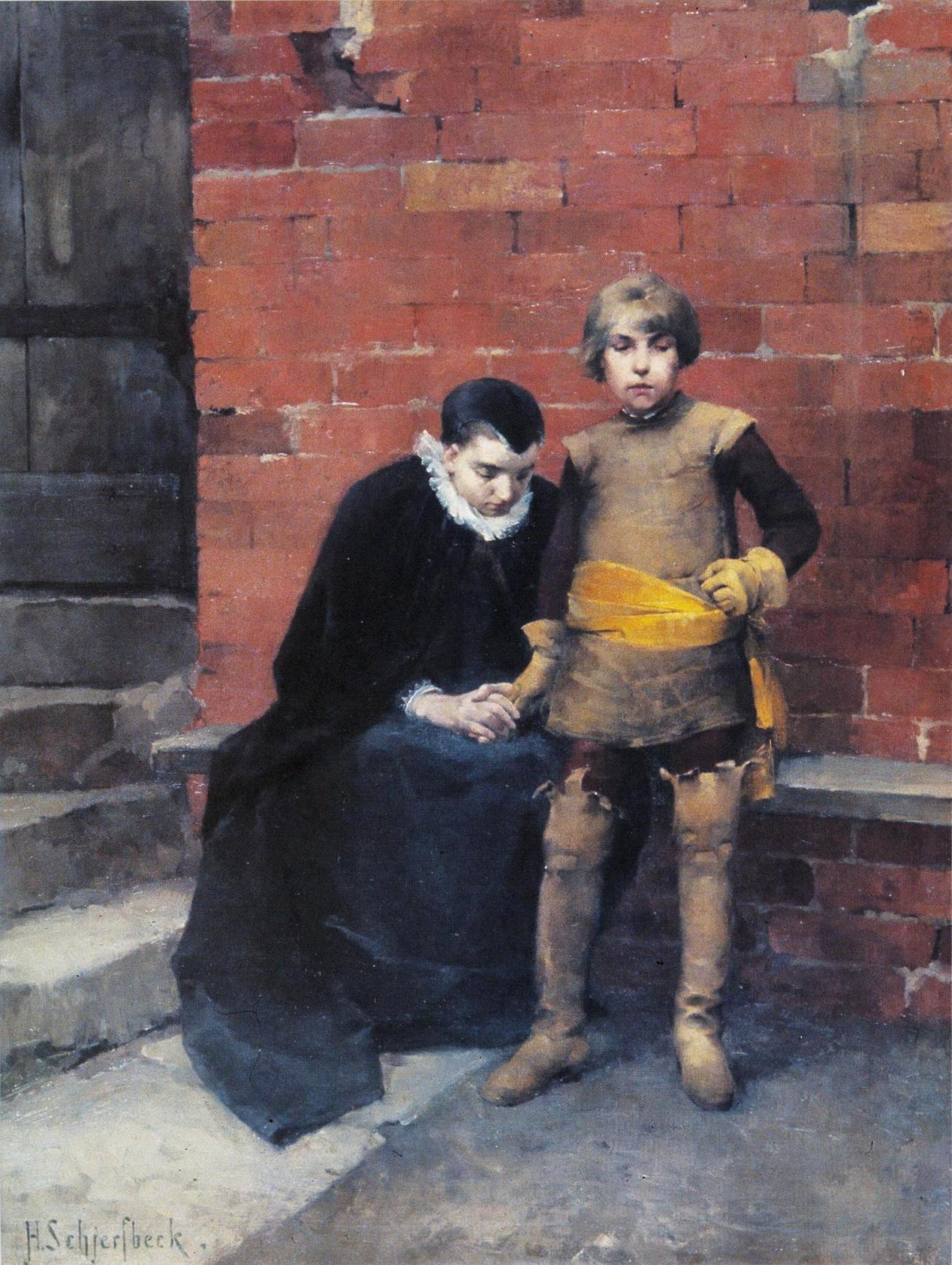
At the Door of Linköping Jail in 1600, Helene Schjerfbeck, 1882, Kristina and her son after they have heard of the execution of Gustaf

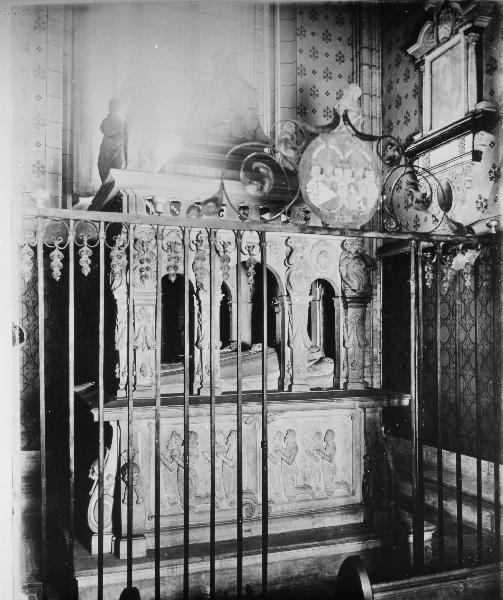
Burial monument of Gustaf and his wife Kristina, Uppsala Cathedral

== Personal life ==
Gustaf Banér was married on October 8, 1581, to Kristina Svantesdotter Sture (1559–1619), a daughter of the Privy Councilor and Riksmarsalken Svante Sture the Younger (1517–1567). Her mother was Märta Erikdotter Leijonhufvud, so Kristina was a first cousin of the kings Eric XIV, John III and Charles IX of Sweden. Like her mother, she was constantly pregnant during much of her marriage, giving birth to a total of 14 children in just 16 years. However, four of them died before reaching adulthood:

1. Margareta Gustafsdotter Banér (1582–1618)
2. Svante Gustafsson Banér (1584–1628), Privy Councilor and Governor of Riga
3. Anna Gustafsdotter Banér (1585–1656)
4. Martha Gustafsdotter Banér (1586–1586), died in infancy
5. Axel Gustafsson Banér (1587–1594), died in childhood
6. Per (Peder) Gustafsson Banér (1588–1644)
7. Nils Gustafsson Banér (1589–1614)
8. A daughter who died at birth (1590)
9. Sigrid Gustafsdotter Banér (1592–1669)
10. Martha Gustafsdotter Banér (1593–1638)
11. Axel Gustafsson Banér (1594–1642), Privy Councilor and Reichsmarshal
12. Johan Gustafsson Banér (1596–1641), Privy Councilor and Field Marshal
13. Erik Gustafsson Banér (1597–1597), died in infancy
14. Karl Gustafsson Banér (1598–1632), State Secretary and Deputy Governor of Prussia

== Other sources ==
- The article Banér, Gustaf in Nationalencyklopedin (1990)
