= Djursholm Castle =

- Danderyd Municipality, Sweden
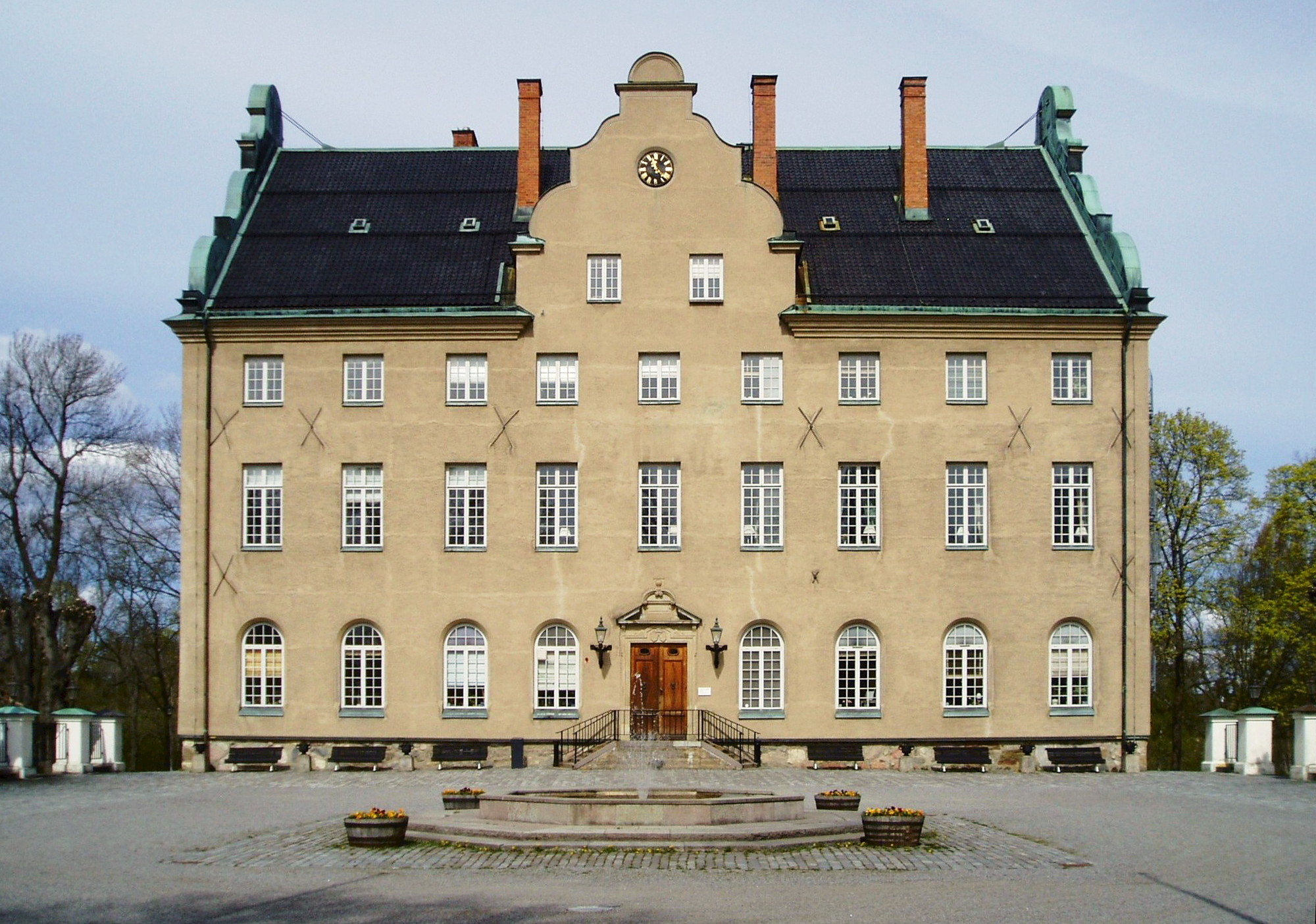

Site information
- Type: Castle

Location
- Coordinates: 59°24′05″N 18°05′21″E

Djursholm Castle (Djursholms slott) is a castle in Sweden.

Djursholm is located in Danderyd Municipality, within Stockholm urban area. The castle includes building components from the late Middle Ages. It was the main building on the estate Djursholm, which was owned by the House of Banér from 1508 to 1813. Nils Eskilsson (Banér), who was lord of Djursholm 1508 to 1520, built a new palace at the place where Djursholm Castle remains.

Djursholm Castle was the residence of both Privy Councillour Gustaf Banér and his son, Field Marshal Johan Banér. Svante Gustavsson Banér gave the castle its present appearance in the 17th century. By the mid 17th century the castle was its present size. The main hall was fitted at this time, with plaster ceilings, stairs castle was of limestone and oak, and walls hung with art wallpaper full of gilt leather (leather wallpaper) and other materials.

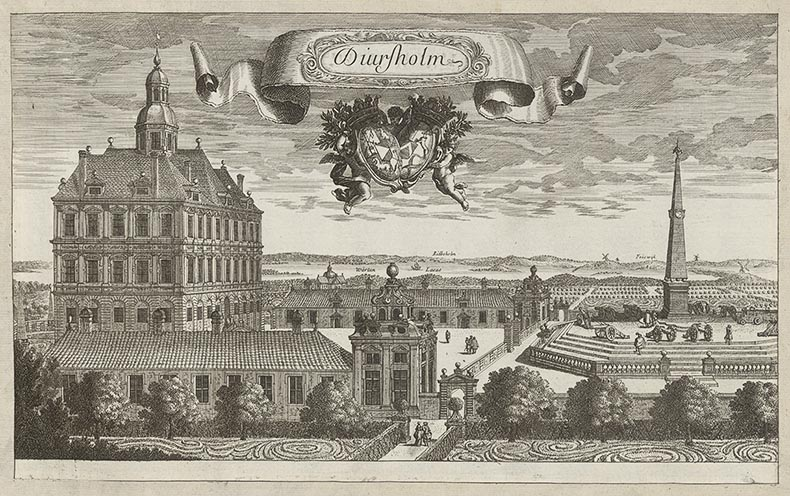
Djursholm castle around 1700.

== History ==
Ekeby farm was donated to St. Clara monastery by King Magnus Ladulås in 1288, and in the early 15th century, the monastery's property also included Ösby farm and the island that is now called Gamla Djursholm and has become a peninsula due to land raising. Nils Jönsson (Oxenstierna) bought Djursholm in 1418 and had the first castle built on Gamla Djursholm, which due to its location had a natural moat and control over part of the shipping into Stockholm and other parts of the interior. Information is found in old rhyming chronicles that he engaged in "piracy" and harbored pirates in his house on the islet who boarded ships that would deliver goods into Stockholm via the western side of Lidingölandet, but may also have been a right to levy customs duties. For nearly 300 years, from the end of the 15th century until the mid-1770s, the entire Lidingön belonged to Djursholm's estate. Lidingö came to belong to Djursholm through Ingeborg Larsdotter Tott, who in her second marriage married Councilor Nils Eskilsson (Banér) (1480–1520).

In 1891, Djursholms secondary school (Djursholms samskola) was started in the building. Until 1910, Djursholms secondary school operated on the premises. The first inspector of Djursholms samskolas was author Viktor Rydberg. Among the earliest teachers were Erik Axel Karlfeldt and Alice Tegner. Writer Elsa Beskow was an art teacher and her husband, theologian Natanael Beskow served as the headmaster of the school from 1897 to 1909.

In the 1890s, the castle was restored in neo-Baroque style. Facade design was simplified by a new restoration from 1959 to 1961. A new entrance with modern suitability to the castle was built on the north side in 2003. Today it serves as the community center (kommunhus) in Danderyd Municipality.

== See also ==
- List of castles in Sweden

== Other sources ==
- Renqvist, K.E. Djursholm – vår hembygd (1961)
