= Fanny Brate =

Swedish artist (1861–1940)

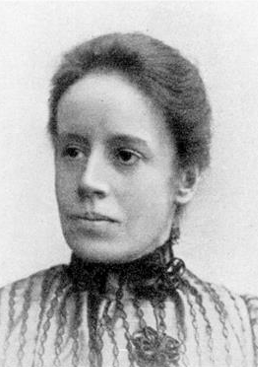
- Born: 26 February 1861; Stockholm, Sweden
- Died: 22 April 1940 (aged 79); Stockholm, Sweden
- Education: Konstfack, Royal Swedish Academy of Arts

Fanny Ingeborg Matilda Brate (née Ekbom; 26 February 1861 – 22 April 1940) was a Swedish painter. She specialized in genre scenes, featuring families, which are often cited as the inspiration for similar works by Carl Larsson.

== Biography ==
Fanny Brate was the daughter of Johan Frans Gustaf Oskar Ekbom (1832-1894), a clerk in the household of Prince Oscar, Duke of Östergötland (later, King Oscar II), and she was born in the Arvfurstens palats. From 1868 to 1877, she studied at a girls' school, followed by drawing lessons at the Arts and Crafts School. She became a full-time student there from 1878 to 1879. That year, she began taking classes from August Malmström at the Royal Swedish Academy of Fine Arts. In 1885, she received a Royal Medal for a painting of herself surrounded by school children.

In 1887, with the help of a travel scholarship from the Royal Academy, she attended classes at the Académie Colarossi in Paris. Later that year, she married the runologist, Erik Brate. They had four daughters. Torun, their second, also became a painter. She continued to make study trips throughout Western Europe, including a visit to the Exposition Universelle (1889). By the turn of the century, she had adopted Impressionist styles and joined the Skagen Painters. Many of her works depicted her own children. The process of raising them also inspired her to illustrate children's books, such as Mormors eventyr (Grandma's Tales), and take part in the ongoing debate about education.

In 1891, she became a member of the Svenska konstnärernas förening (the Swedish Artists' Association).

The Nationalmuseum held a memorial exhibition of her collected works in 1943. Her works may also be seen at the Nordiska museet and the Göteborgs konstmuseum

== Selected paintings ==
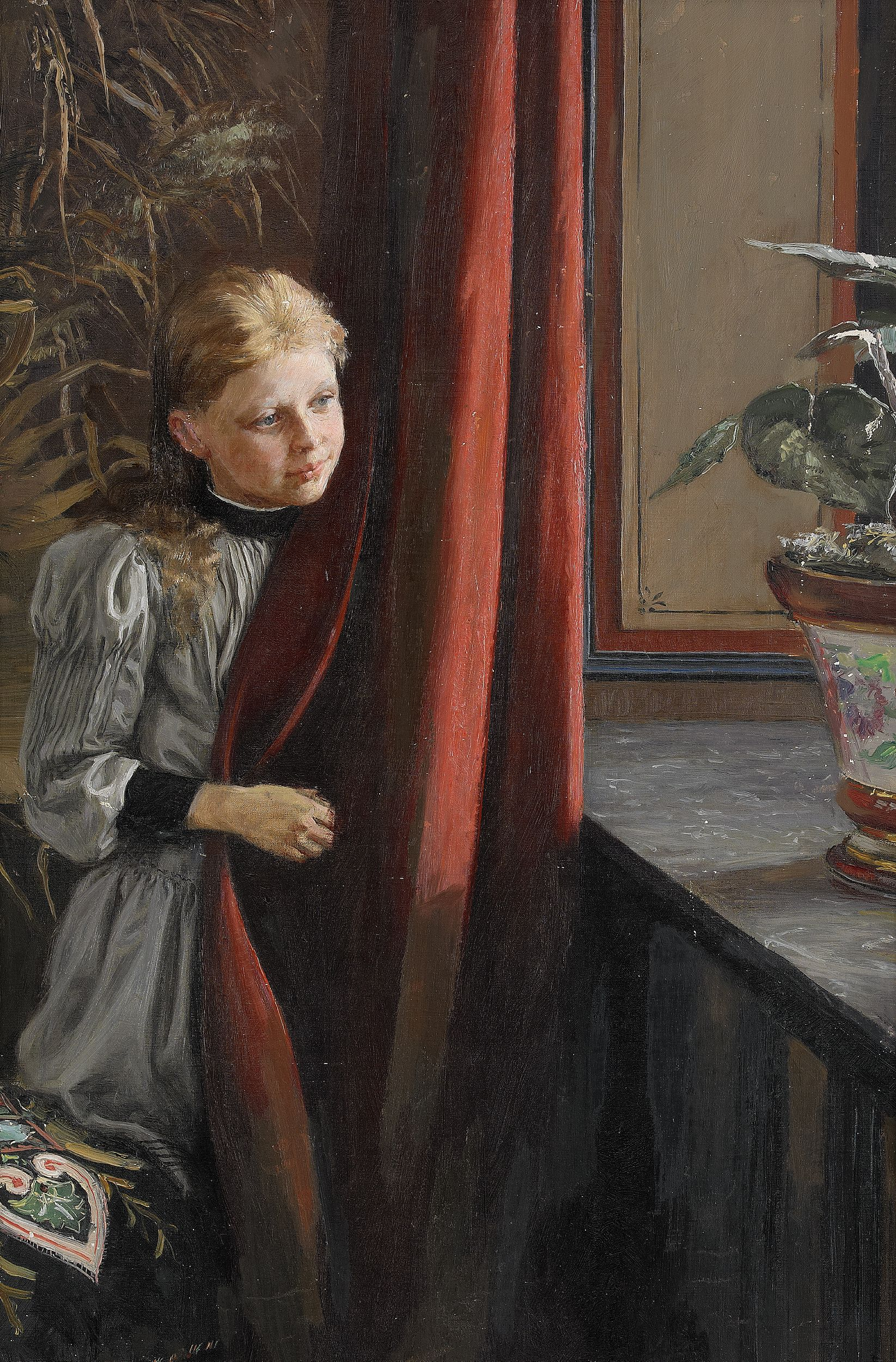
Girl at the Window

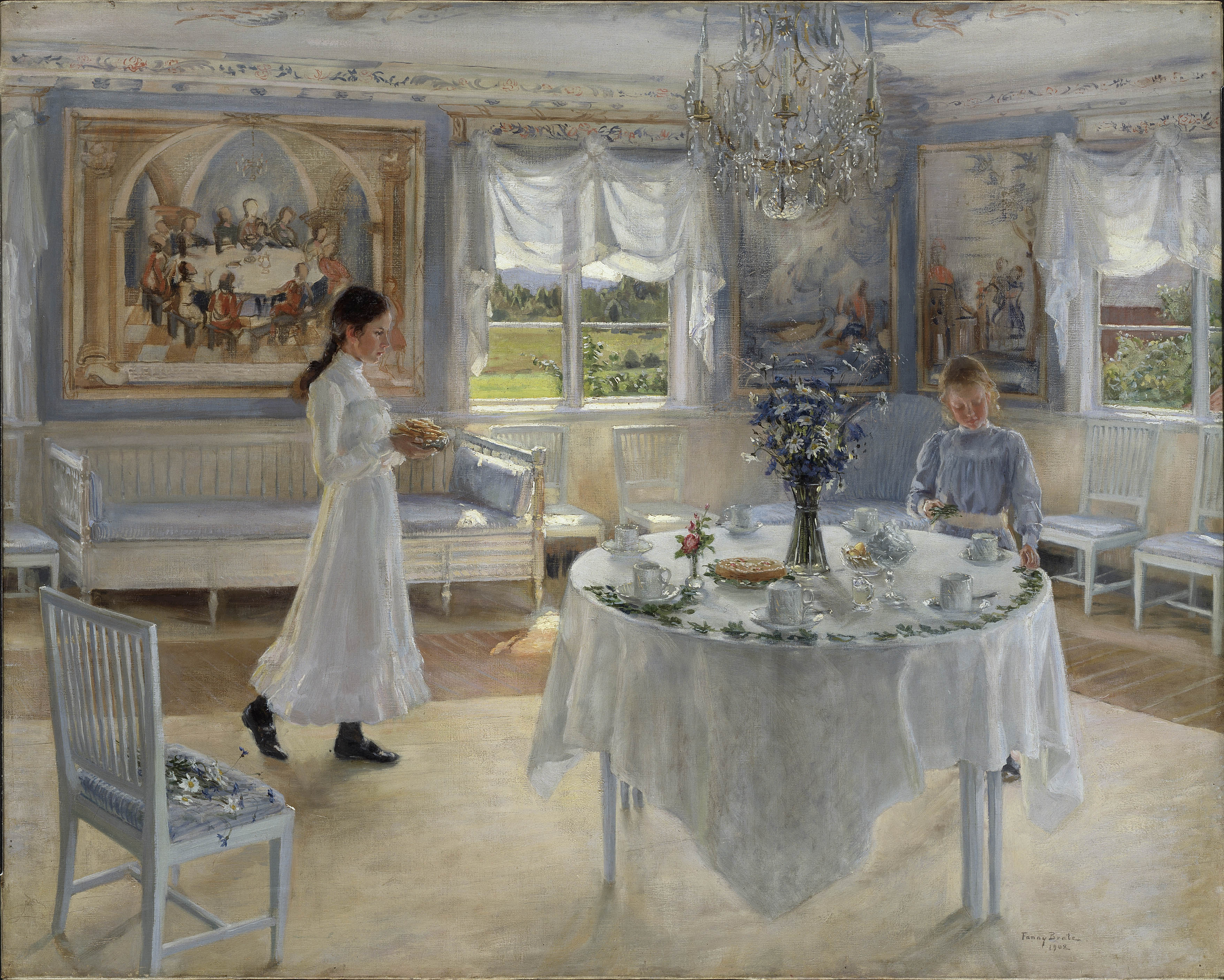
Name Day

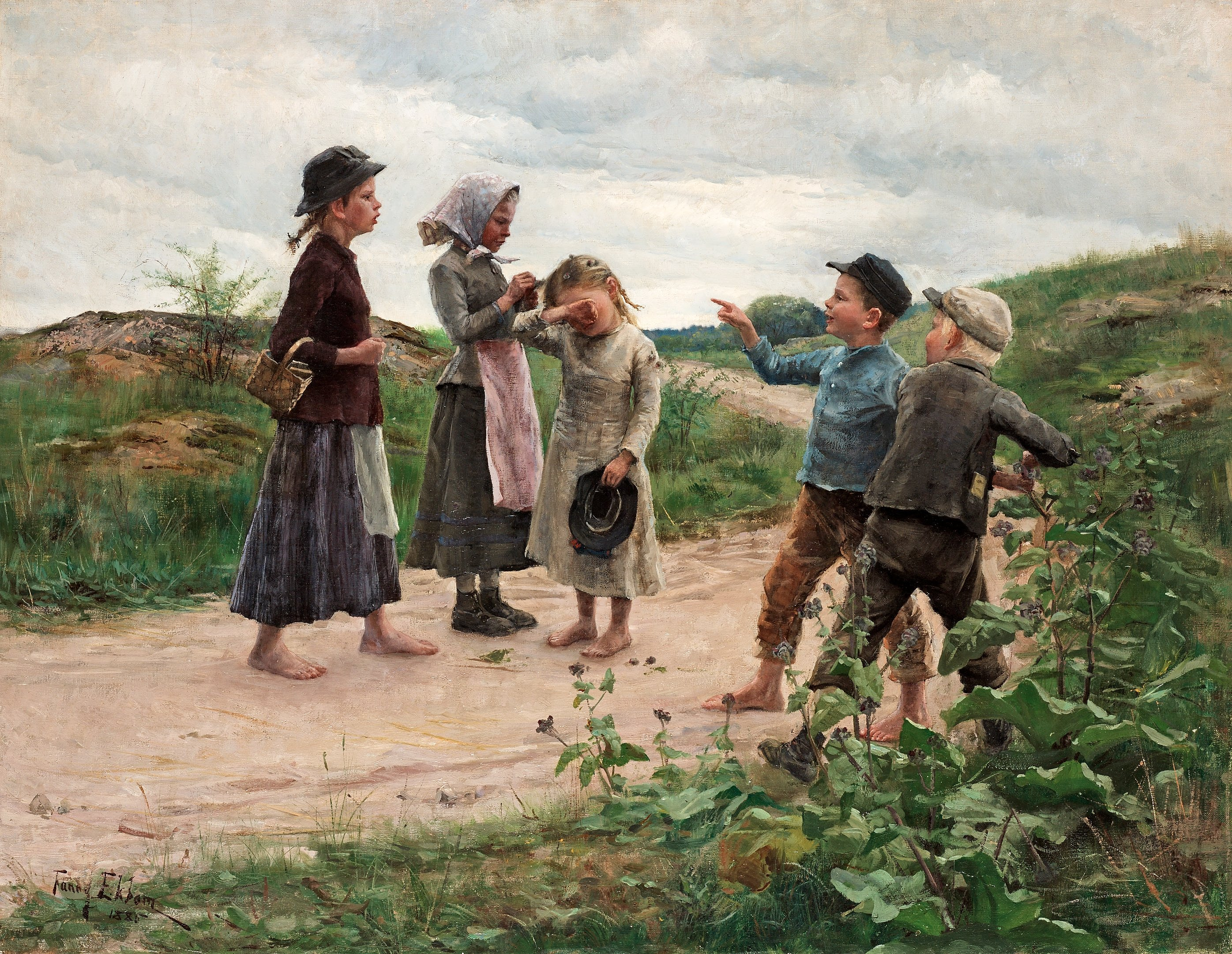
Teasing

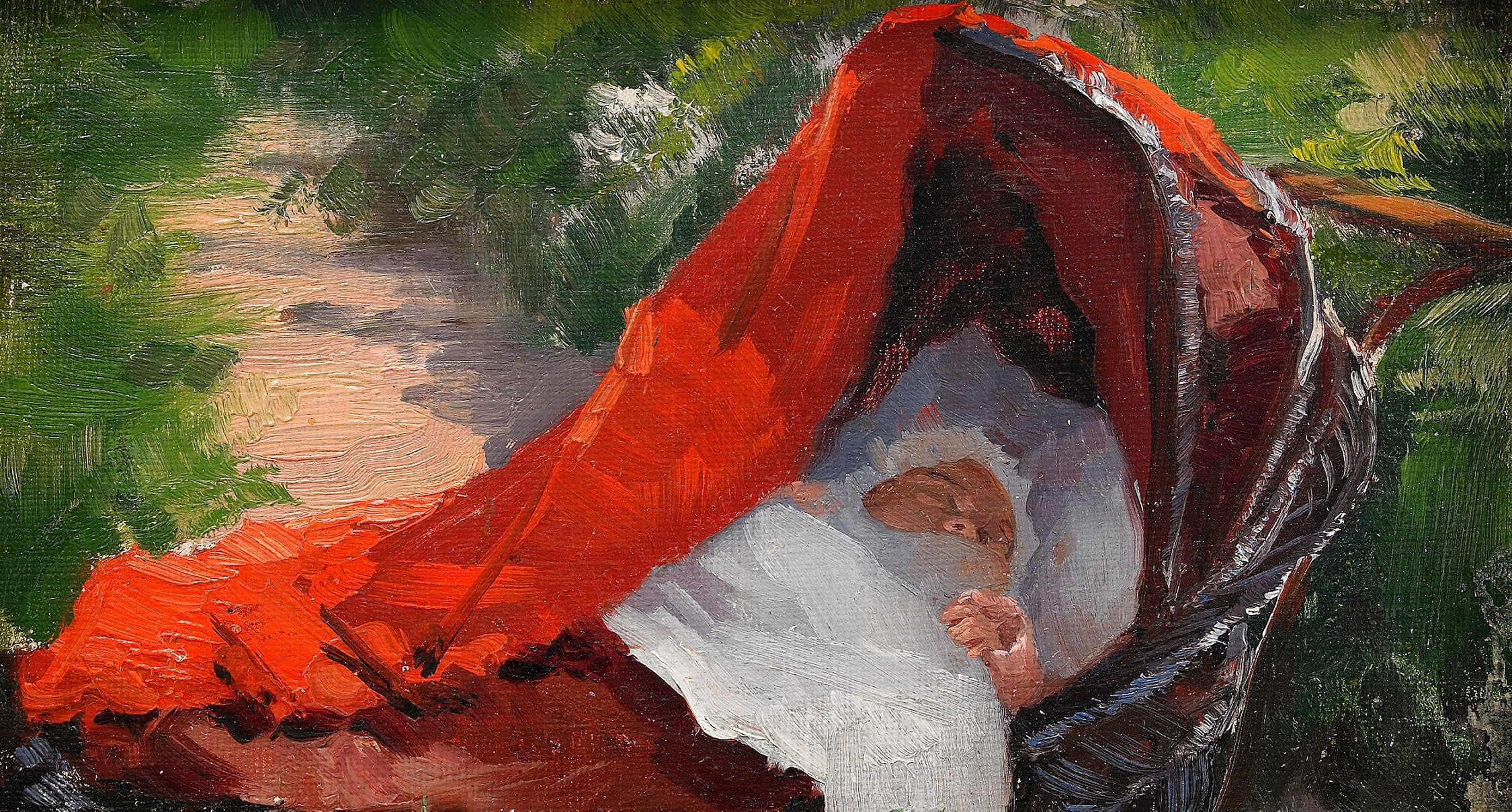
"Sleep so Sweet"
