= Assault on Vatikivi =

Attack on Vatikivi in 1495

- Part of the Russo-Swedish War (1495–1497)
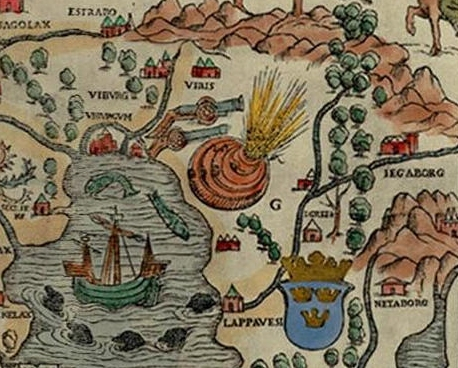
- Olaus Magnus' depiction of the Viborg Bang
Date	12 October 1495
Location	Vatikivi, Russia
Result	Russian victory

Belligerents
Sweden	Principality of Moscow

Commanders and leaders
Knut Posse; Hartwig Winholt; Niilo Pentinpoika (POW); Maunu Prille (POW)	Unknown

Strength
800 peasants 100 soldiers Several boats	Unknown, but more than the Swedes

Casualties and losses
Hundreds killed, wounded, or captured Several boats sunk	Negligible

The Assault on Vatikivi (Swedish: Anfallet på Vatikivi; Russian: Нападение на Ватикиви) was a failed Swedish attempt to dislodge a Russian force that was blockading the Swedish defenders at Viborg from their positions at Vatikivi during the Russo-Swedish War (1495–1497).

== Background ==
Leaders

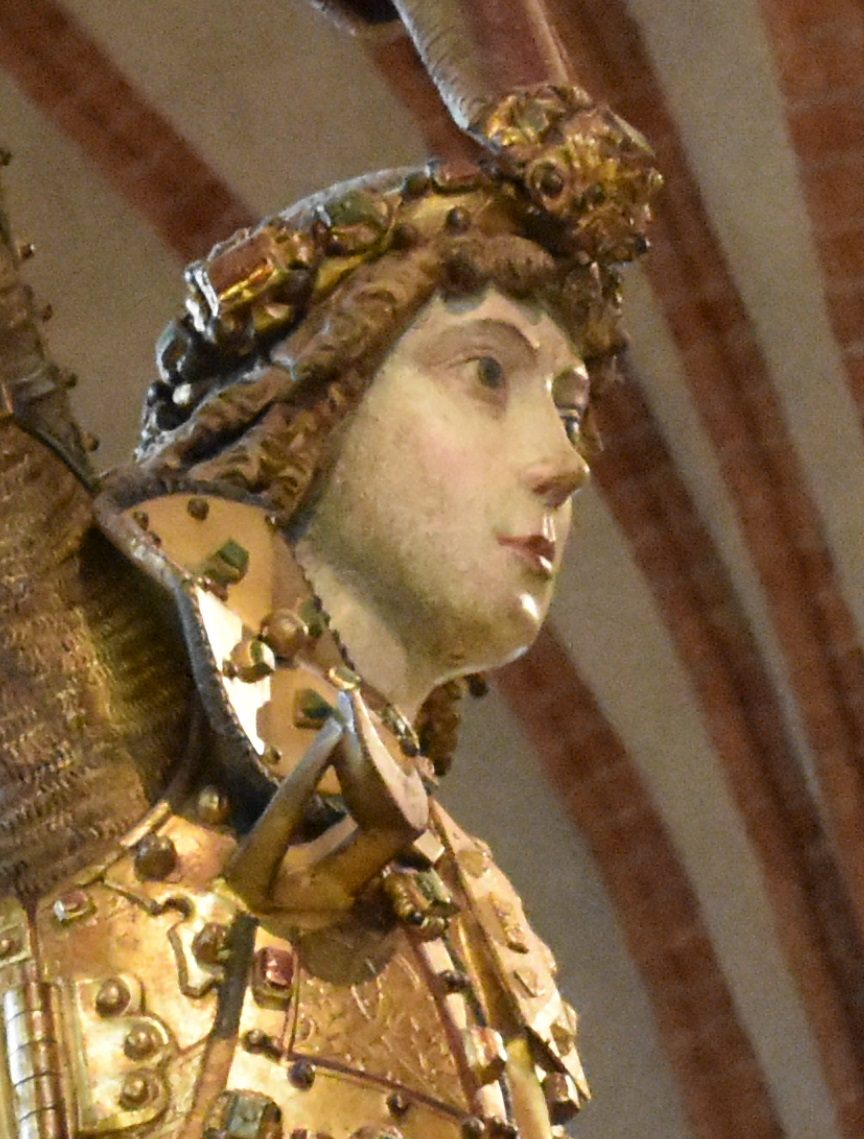
Sten Sture the Elder

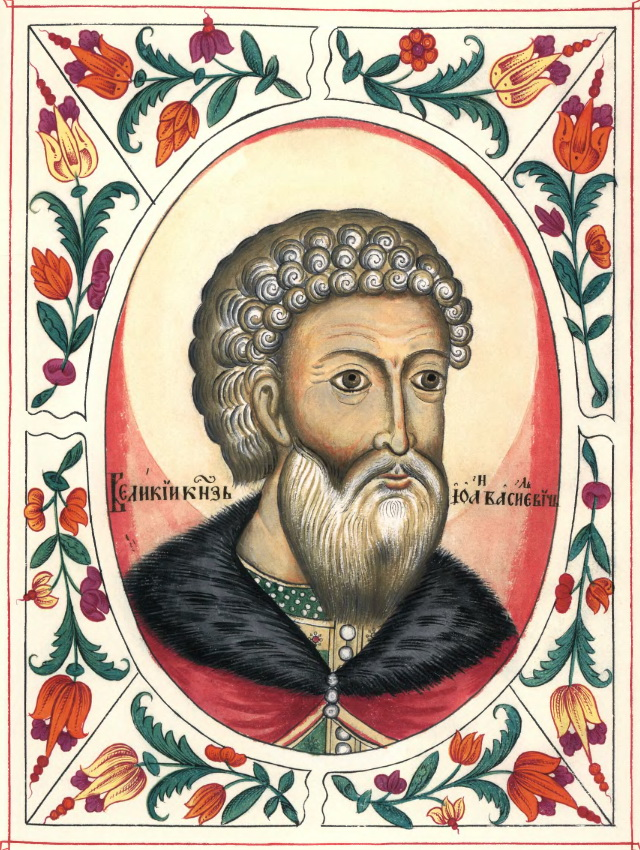
Ivan III

=== Beginning of the Russo-Swedish War (1495–1497) ===
In August 1495, the awaited Russian attack began, with the Russians burning and destroying the villages of Nykyrka, Mohla, and Kivinebb. The frightened villagers fled and flooded into Viborg, with the Russians chasing behind them.

=== Russian advance towards Viborg ===
When he received news of the advance, Bishop Magnus in Åbo bombarded Sten Sture with letters, with extreme exaggerations like that the Russians were preparing to send a fleet of 2,000 ships to Stockholm.

=== Siege of Viborg ===
On 21 September the first Russians appeared outside of Viborg and the city was quickly surrounded on all sides. Russian siege trebuchets threw massive boulders towards the wall, with the biggest one being able to throw meter long boulders, which destroyed the wooden defenses outside of the city. The bombardments struck fear in the defenders, being 1,800 troops called up from Stockholm and Åbo and 800 quickly organized peasants from Nyland.

== Assault ==
=== Preparations ===
On 12 October Knut Posse made an attempt to break the siege, with the assault being decided to be directed towards Vatikivi during night time. The Swedish force amounted to around 900 men or half of the defenders, with 100 of them being soldiers and 800 being peasants from Nyland.

=== Attack ===
On the same day, Niilo Pentinpoika, Maunu Prille, and Hartwig Winholt along with Knut Posse accompanied by the Swedish force began rowing to Vatikivi. As quickly as they landed, a cry was heard signaling that the Russians were coming, the inexperienced peasants were frightened by the Russians and ran back as quickly as possible to the boats, with half of them sinking as they crowded into them. On the other hand, the soldiers stayed in their positions and kept defending and repelled the Russian attack until all of the boats had been emptied. Quickly after, another Russian force began attacking the soldiers on the shore. However, the peasants once again ran back to the boats causing several more to sink, and in the chaos that ensued Maunu Prille and Niilo Pentinpoika were captured by the Russians.

Hundreds are said to have been captured, killed, or wounded on the Swedish side, with the majority of the soldiers being killed. Hartwig was able to save himself by swimming away from the shore and grabbing ahold of a rope thrown from one of the escaping boats.

== Aftermath ==
After the defeat, Knut Posse moved to a full defence of Viborg, with the Russians assaulting the walls only a day later, but suffering heavy casualties in the process, and with the walls staying mostly unaffected.
