= Assault on Ivangorod =

Swedish assault in 1496

- Part of the Russo-Swedish War (1495–1497)
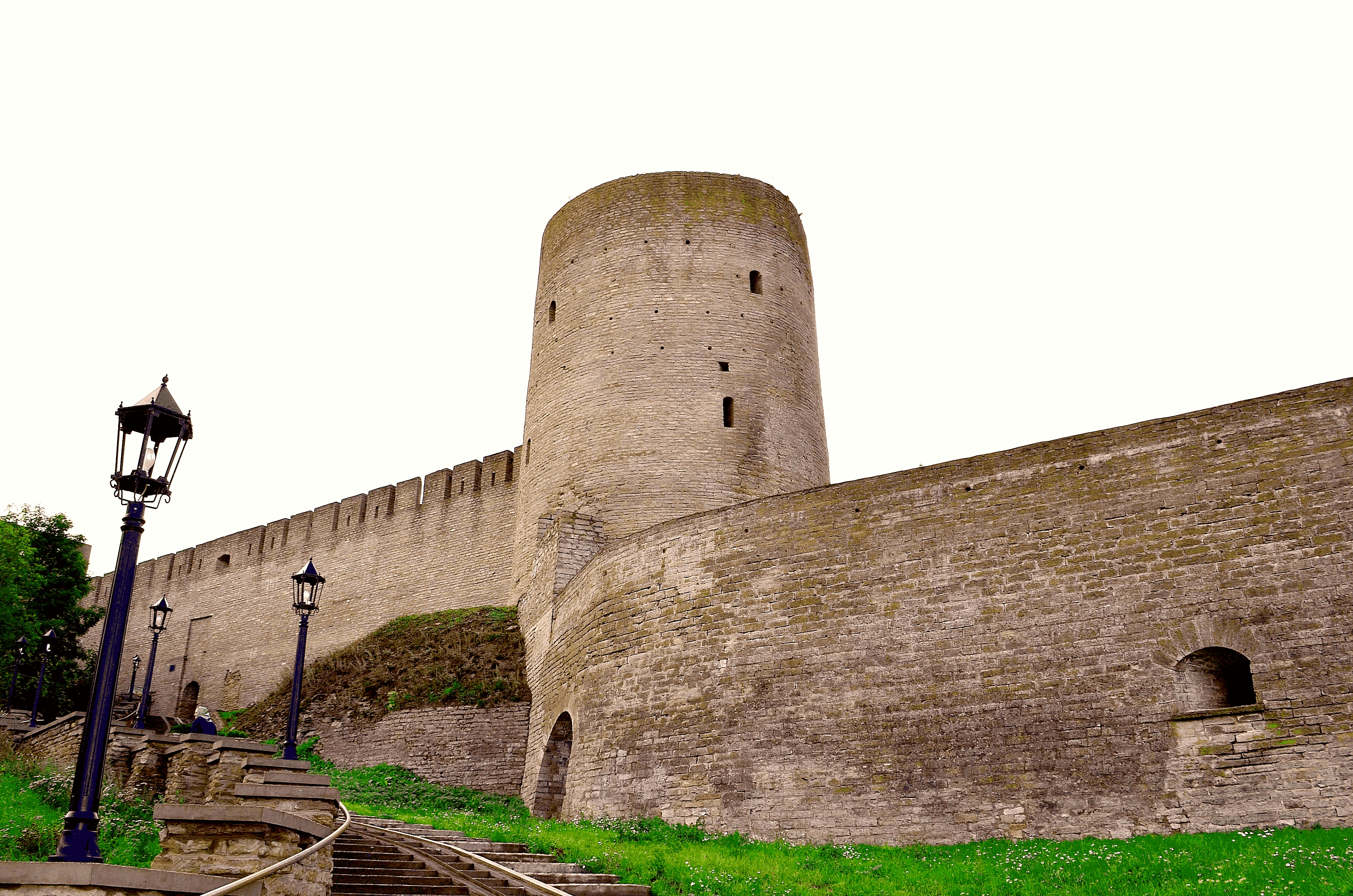
- Ivangorod today
Date	August 19–27, 1496
Location	Ivangorod, Russia 59°22′N 28°13′E
Result	Swedish victory
Territorial changes	Ivangorod is destroyed by the Swedes

Belligerents
Sweden	Grand Principality of Moscow

Commanders and leaders
Knut Posse; Svante Nilsson	Yuryi Babich †

Strength
2,000–5,000 men 70 vessels	3,000 men

Casualties and losses
minor	3,000 soldiers and civilians killed 300 captured

The assault on Ivangorod was a battle fought between the Grand Principality of Moscow and the Kingdom of Sweden at the Russian fortress of Ivangorod in 1496, resulting in the mass plundering of the city and thousands of civilians being killed by the Swedes. It was later burned down because the Swedes lacked resources to defend it.

== Background ==
The Russian fortress of Ivangorod was built along a series of other fortifications on the border with Livonia. In September 1495, a Russian force amounting to about 10,000 advanced towards the Swedish fortress of Viborg (Vyborg) and besieged it, the Swedish defenders managed to beat back many of the assaults by the Russian force but on the 30th of November the Russians attacked with all of their forces and managed to get inside, this was stopped however by a large explosion in one of the towers, which forced the Russians back, after this, Knut Posse and Svante Nilsson began organizing an expedition into Russia to raze Ivangorod.

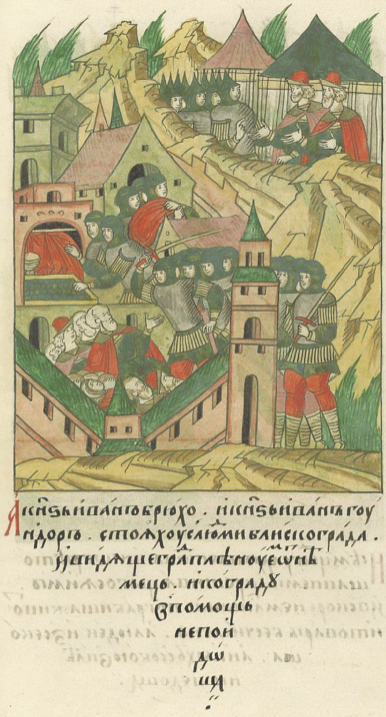
Siege of Ivangorod, Illustrated Chronicle, 16th century

== Assault ==
In the summer of 1496, 70 vessels with 2,000–5,000 men entered saield into the river Narva and managed to penetrate 20 kilometers upstream towards Ivangorod which had a garrison of 3,000 men. The commander was Yuryi Babich. The fortress presented the Swedes with an excellent strategic objective for a Swedish counterstrike.

The Swedish vessels carried guns designed for deck-to-shore fire and were built to destroy opposing land batteries and the troops carried gunpowder firearms. Ivangorod lacked sufficient fortifications, only having unfinished wooden bastions. It also lacked guns and the militia had little firearms. After an eight-day long, the Swedes stormed the fortress, overruning the garrison after eight hours.

The Swedes thoroughly sacked Ivangorod, massacring 3,000 inhabitants, civilians along with the garrison. In a few days, the Swedes departed back to Finland with 300 prisoners and expensive furs. The reason for the departure and destruction of the fortress was that neither Knut or Svante had the recources to stay and defend it.

== Aftermath ==
Ivan III was determined to keep his foothold in the Baltics, and the Russians rebuilt the fortress into a larger, quadrilateral structure which was extended toward the border with Livonia.

At the beginning of 1497, a message from Kexholm arrived in Viborg with information that the Russians were asking for peace. In order to draw up instructions for the Swedish envoys, Knut Posse and other commanders at Viborg held a meeting in Borgå with Bishop Magnus. Shortly thereafter, a six-year truce was concluded on Sten Sture's behalf.

== Sources ==
- O'Connor, Kevin C. (15 November 2019). The House of Hemp and Butter: A History of Old Riga. Cornell University Press. ISBN 978-1-5017-4770-0.
