= German Titov Street =

Street in Vyborg, Russia

German Titov Street (Finnish: Possenkatu, lit. 'Possen Street') is a short street, approximately 150 meters long, located in the historic center of Vyborg, in Leningrad Oblast, Russia. It runs from Castle Street to Vyborgskaya Street.

== History ==
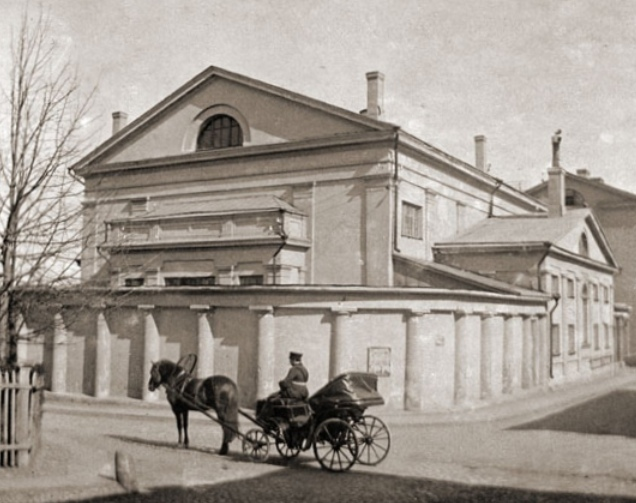
Pre-revolutionary photo of the street (then known as Theater Street)

The street was constructed along the line of the old city defensive wall, which separated the Stone Town from the Horned Fortress and was dismantled in the 18th century. It was formed in the early 19th century. After the construction of the Vyborg Theater building in 1832, the street was renamed Theater Street. From 1929, after Finland's declaration of independence, the Finnish name Possenkatu became official, named in honor of Knut Posse, the commandant of Vyborg Castle, who led the defense of the city during the 1495 siege by Russian forces. This period is associated with the legend of the Vyborg Thunder (when St. Andrew's Tower, located in the area of present-day Titov Street, exploded).

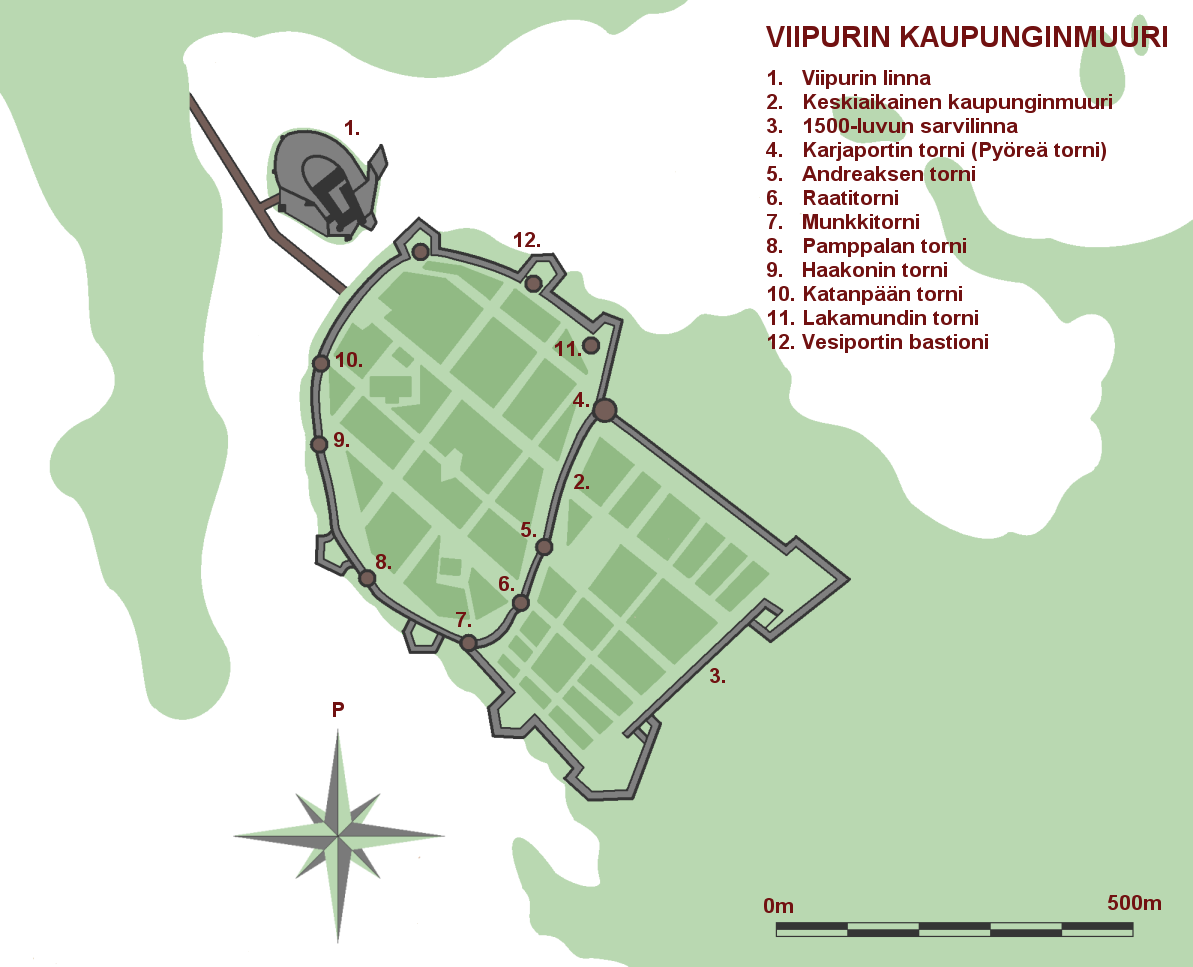
Map of Vyborg's medieval fortifications

The street's buildings were damaged during the Soviet-Finnish War (1939-1940) and during the Great Patriotic War, and the theater building has not survived. During Soviet times, the street was also named Krimskaya Street. The modern name was given in honor of Soviet cosmonaut German Titov (1935-2000).

== Notable landmarks ==
- Building No. 1 - "Kochegarka" Rock Club
- Building No. 4 - I. Naukkarinen Residential Building (1902, architect: Antti Korppimäki)
