= Inter-Nordic conflict of 1302–1319 =

Period of conflict in the Scandinavian kingdoms

The Inter-Nordic conflict of 1302–1319 was a long-term conflict in Sweden, where Birger Magnusson and his brothers, dukes Valdemar and Eric, were the central figures. The conflict also involved the kingdoms of Denmark and Norway.

Birger, after his father Magnus Ladulås died, became the regent of Sweden in the year of 1290. Birger's brothers joined forces in an attempt to gain more power in Sweden, and were supported by King of Haakon V of Norway, while King Eric VI of Denmark supported his brother-in-law, King Birger. At stake was also the throne of Norway, as Haakon did not have a son, and his daughter Ingeborg's son would be the first in line for the throne. The conflict calmed down after the Treaty of Helsingborg in 1310, after which Duke Eric controlled a territory at the intersection of the three Nordic kingdoms. He held Kungahälla in Norway, western parts of Sweden, and Northern Halland as a fief from Denmark.

The conflict resumed in 1317, when Birger imprisoned his brothers at the Nyköping Banquet and let them starve to death. In the following upheavals, Birger lost his throne, and Duke Eric's three-year old son Magnus was elected King of Sweden, and acknowledged as the hereditary King of Norway, uniting the two kingdoms in a personal union.

== Background ==
The royal houses of the three Scandinavian kingdoms of Denmark, Sweden and Norway had started to become increasingly entangled with each other from mid-thirteenth century onwards, and this trend would continue until the formation of the Kalmar Union in the late middle ages. In 1280s, Erik Menved and Birger Magnusson, the future kings of Denmark and Sweden, were engaged to each other's sisters to form an alliance between the ruling monarchs of Denmark and Sweden. In this situation, the Norwegian kings tended to cooperate with the opposition forces in Denmark and Sweden.

When King Erik Klipping of Denmark was murdered in 1286, the new king Erik Menved exploited the situation by blaming a group of aristocrats for complicity in the murder of his father and sentenced them as outlaws. The outlaws declared their innocence and swore allegiance in 1287 to Eric II of Norway who used them as instruments in his expansionist politics. The leading aristocrat among the outlaws was Count Jacob Nielsen, who began the construction of the fortresses of Hunehals and Varberg in northern Halland. Another outlaw, Marsk Stig, built a fortress on the island of Hjelm near the coast of Jylland. These fortresses were located at the intersection of the three kingdoms, and were used in Norwegian raids against Denmark and to control the trade through the surrounding sounds and belts. The Armistice of Hindsgavl in 1295 ended the hostilities between Norway and Denmark, and the outlaws regained their lands.

In Sweden, Birger Magnusson had been designated the future king in 1284. At the same time, his brother Eric was granted Södermanland and part of Uppland as a duchy, while Valdemar received Finland. These titles remained nominal as long as King Magnus Ladulås lived and Birger was not of age. Magnus Ladulås died in 1290, and for a decade the Swedish government was steered by a regency council dominated by the marsk Torgils Knutsson. Birger came of age in 1302. He assumed control of the government, while Eric and Valdemar assumed the control over their duchies. Both Torkel Knutsson and the dukes were given seats on Birger's royal council.

== Alliance between Norway and Sweden ==
A new period of conflict started on September 1302, when King Haakon V of Norway met King Birger and the Dukes Eric and Valdemar in Solberga by the Göta älv at the Swedish-Norwegian border, and an agreement was reached. Haakon's one-year old daughter Ingeborg was betrothed with Duke Eric, then 20 years old. Haakon had earlier changed the order of succession in Norway so that Ingeborg's male issue could inherit the throne. In return, Birger agreed to a military alliance against Denmark and took the outlaws under his protection. On Haakon's part, this meeting was an attempt to end his isolation, but Birger's motives for the alliance are harder to understand. It has been suggested that the Swedish initiative actually did not come from Birger, but from Duke Eric or Torgils Knutsson. However, this alliance would not last for long.

Birger fell out with his brothers in 1304 and confiscated their fiefs in Sweden. The dukes fled to Denmark, and having received no support there, to Norway. King Haakon received the dukes well, giving Eric, his future son-in-law, South Bohuslän with the castle of Ragnhildarholm as a fief. From this stronghold, the dukes launched attacks on the Swedish side, burning Lödöse and gaining control of the Göta älv. Birger launched a successful counterattack with Danish help, after which an agreement was reached. The dukes regained their Swedish fiefs but were forced to submit to Birger and acknowledge his children as heirs to the throne. When Count Jacob ceded North Halland to Haakon in 1305, that territory was also granted to Eric.

== Håtuna games ==
In 1306, after Duke Eric and Valdemar had been at a wedding feast in Bjälbo, they met Birger at the kings manor in Håtuna. After the brothers had met in Håtuna, Eric and Valdemar brought Birger to Nyköping, and took him as a prisoner for several years.

Birger was imprisoned from 1306 to 1308, he got freed after he had made plenty of promises, one of them being that Birger would give away half of his power over Sweden to his brothers in exchange of getting peace and truce with them.

== Latter phase ==
In 1317, Birger Magnusson lured his brothers Eric and Valdemar to Nyköping under the premise of a Banquet, imprisoned them and then let them starve to death. It is unclear when and where the brothers died. This action was done in revenge of what Birgers brothers had done against him in 1306, when Birger got imprisoned. In the following uproar, forces loyal to Eric and Valdemar defeated those loyal to king Birger, who was forced to flee, first to the island of Gotland and later to Denmark. His son Magnus was captured and executed, and Eric's son Magnus Ericsson was elected king in 1319.

== See also ==
- Coup against Torkel Knutsson

== Sources ==
- Larrea, Beñat Elortza (13 March 2023). Polity Consolidation and Military Transformation in Medieval Scandinavia: A European Perspective, c.1035–1320. BRILL. ISBN 978-90-04-54349-2.
- Helle, Knut (2003-09-04). "Growing inter-Scandinavian entanglement". The Cambridge History of Scandinavia. Cambridge University Press. p. 411–420. doi:10.1017/chol9780521472999.022. ISBN 978-1-139-05357-0.
- Bagge, Sverre (2007). "Aims and means in the inter‐Nordic conflicts 1302–1319". Scandinavian Journal of History. 32 (1): 5–37. doi:10.1080/03468750701191503. ISSN 0346-8755.
