= Coup against Torkel Knutsson =

1305 political overthrow in Sweden

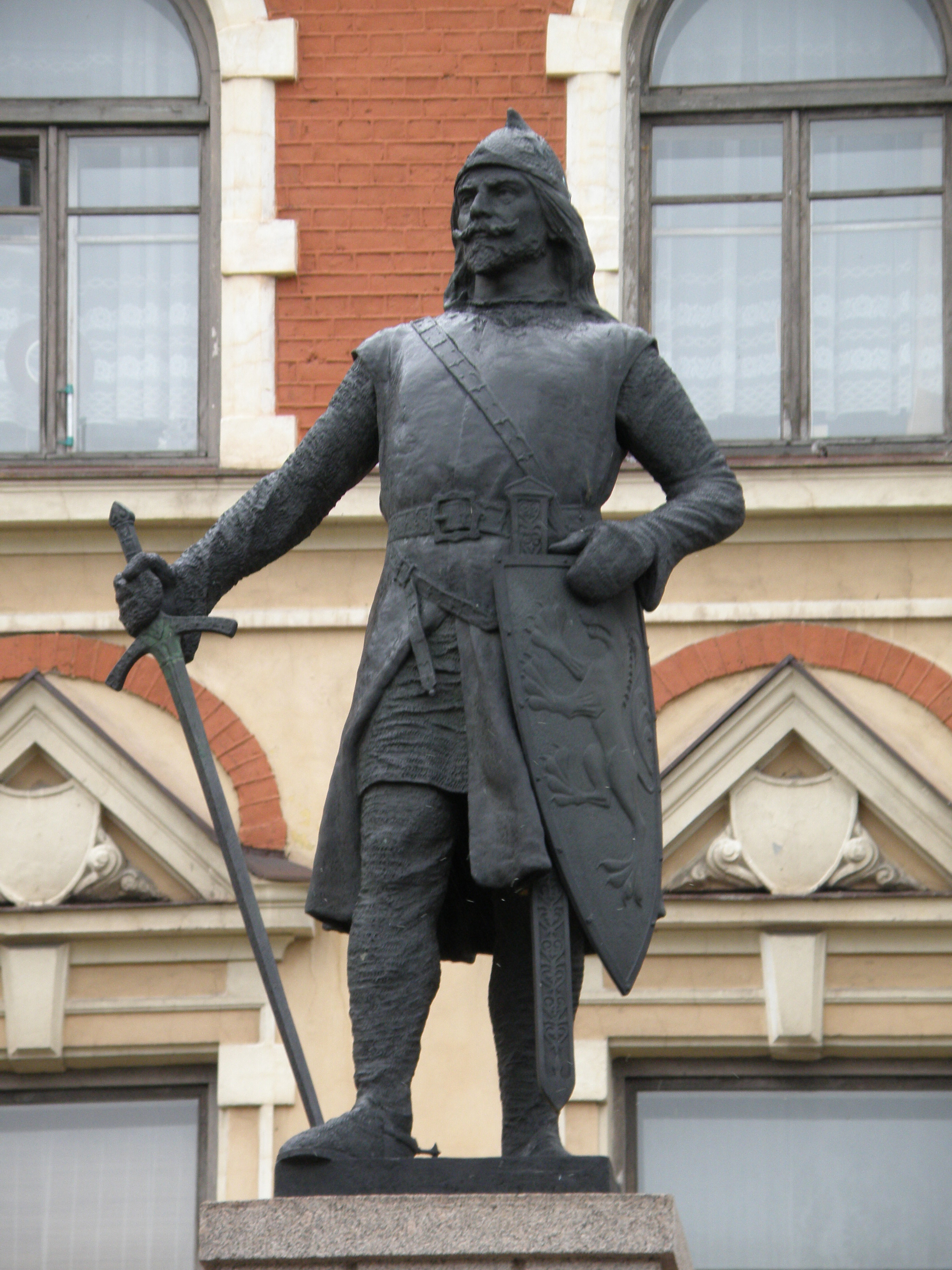
Statue of Knutsson in Vyborg, Russia

The Coup against Torkel Knutsson (Swedish: Kuppen mot Torgils Knutsson) was a successful coup against the then very influential Torkel Knutsson by the Swedish king, Birger, and his brothers Eric and Valdemar in 1305. Torkel was later executed in 1306.

== Background ==
Torkel Knutsson held large amounts of power in Sweden at the time of the coup, however, in the shadows, the king, Birger Magnusson began plotting with his brothers, Eric and Valdemar. Birger had grown tired of Torkels great influence and supposedly saw him as a bigger threat than his brothers, despite the fact that Torkel had shown great loyalty to the king when the brothers had previously rebelled.

The most probable reason as to why Torkel was seen as such a large threat was that he was a very capable leader and highly respected. During his time as regent, Torkel had greatly expanded Sweden's borders. During the Third Swedish Crusade, which he led, he forced the Novgorodians to cede parts of Karelia to the Swedes.

== Coup ==
In December 1305, after the king, his brothers, and the church had allied against him, his farm in Lena was surrounded by a force of warriors along with the king along with his brothers. Torkel was quickly arrested due to him not having a life guard. Allegedly, Torkel offered no resistance while he was getting arrested. Torkels castle at Aranäs was also soon burned to the ground. He was taken to Stockholm with his feet tied under the belly of the horse he was sitting on. After Torkel had been taken to Stockholm Duke Valdemar quickly moved to dissolve the marriage between his daughter and Torkel.

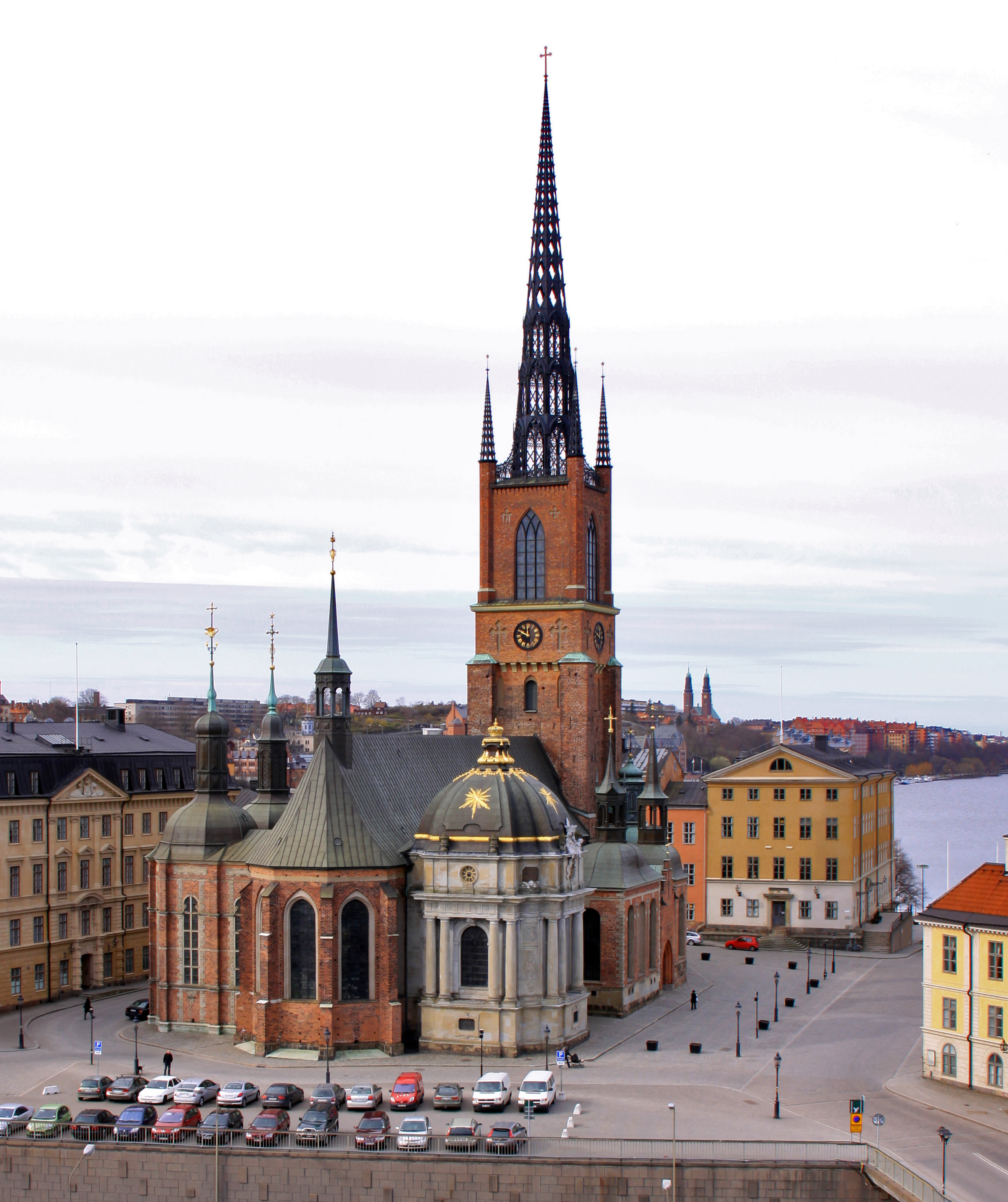
Riddarholmen Church, Stockholm, Sweden

=== Trial and execution ===
Although it is unknown whether Torkel, was sentenced to death, what the accusations were, or the detailed course of the matter, it is likely that the two brothers, after the death of Torkel, received support from angered clergy members against him. Afterwards, Torkel was told by a messenger that Birger has decided that he shall be executed. It is known that Torkel would later be beheaded on Södermalm on 10 February 1306. Torkel became somewhat of martyr and saint, and an altar was raised at the location where the execution took place, mass was said there, and a cross was also placed next to his grave. His kinsmen would later request for his body to be reburied at Riddarholmen instead, which was granted by the king, and Torkel would be buried in Gråmunkekapellet instead.

== Aftermath ==
After the coup, Birger lost one of his largest supporters and he would be imprisoned by his brothers only a short while after during the Håtuna games.
