= Bohus Bang =

1566 explosion in Bohus

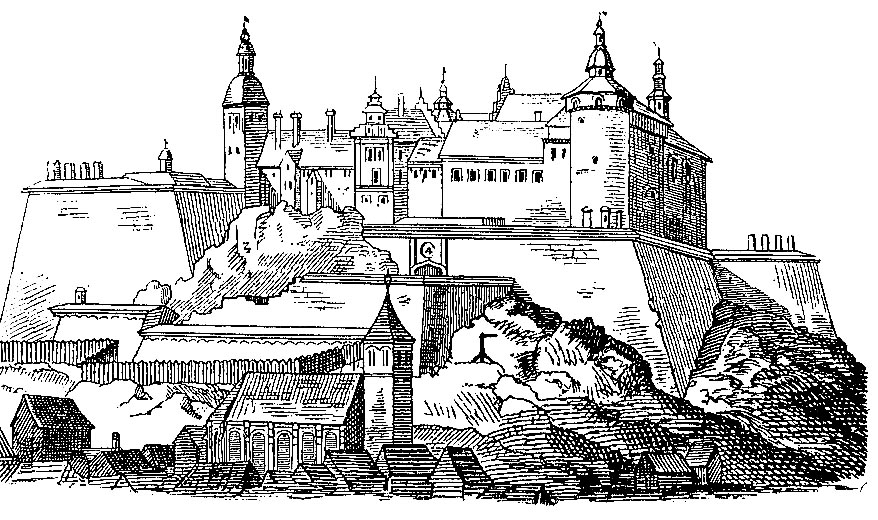
Bohus Fortress as it appeared in 1658.

The Bohus Bang (Swedish: Bohusiska Smällen), as it is traditionally called in Swedish historiography, was a devastating explosion which occurred at Bohus Fortress in March 1566, during an assault by Swedish forces. The explosion was deliberately triggered by the fortress's Danish-Norwegian defenders in order to destroy the so-called 'Red Tower', which had been captured by the Swedes.

== Background ==
Bohus Fortress was the principal stronghold, and indeed namesake of, the province of Bohuslän, which prior to the 1658 Treaty of Roskilde was part of the Kingdom of Norway. Bohus was also one of the two crucial fortresses, the other being Old Älvsborg in Swedish Västergötland, controlling traffic through the estuary of the Göta Älv River. This estuary was especially important for the Swedes because Halland and Skåne were part of Denmark at the time, and so the mouth of the Göta Älv was Sweden's only point of access to the North Sea.

In 1563, the Northern Seven Years War broke out between Sweden and Denmark-Norway, and Danish-Norwegian forces managed to seize control of Älvsborg in a lightning attack. With both Älvsborg and Bohus in Danish-Norwegian hands, the Göta Älv was closed to Swedish vessels, and as the Danish Belts were also now impassable to Swedish vessels, Sweden was thus cut off from the North Sea and by extension from the world beyond the Baltic Sea (and even within the Baltic Swedish trade was heavily constricted, as Poland-Lithuania and Russia were both hostile as well). The resulting loss of trade was crippling to the Swedish economy, and it thus became imperative for the Swedes to regain access to the North Sea by either retaking Älvsborg or capturing Bohus Fortress instead.

Bohus was therefore besieged no fewer than six times during the war; during five of these the garrison was commanded by the Danish officer Jens Holgersen Ulfstand. The largest of the attacks on the fortress was made in spring 1566.

== The 1566 Siege ==
On 5 March the Swedish army broke camp and marched west from Alingsås under the command of Nils Andersson Boije. Among his senior officers were two prominent aristocrats, Nils Sture and Erik Stenbock. On 20 March the siege train arrived at Bohus and on the 23rd the bombardment of the fortress began from the hill of Fontinberget to the north. The Swedish artillery fired some 2820 rounds, successfully making a breach in the walls, and Nils Boije gave the order for the assault at 6 AM on either 26 March or 27 March (accounts differ as to the date of the attempted storming).

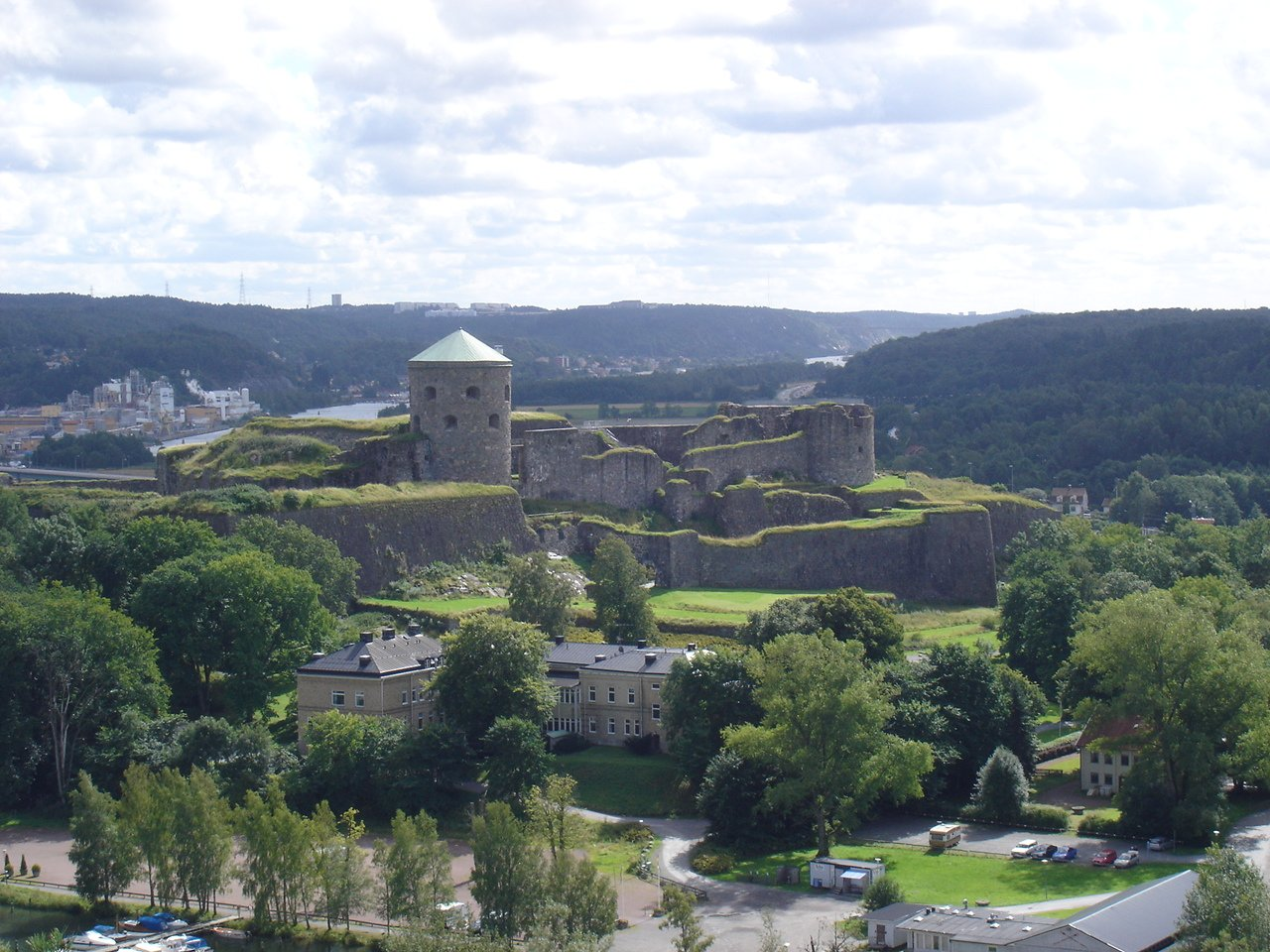
Bohus Fortress from the northwest. This is roughly the view the Swedish gunners would have had of the fortress when they bombarded it in 1566.

The Swedes assaulted the breach with ten fänikor (units of several hundred soldiers men each), but were thrown back three times by the defenders. On the fourth attempt the Swedes successfully forced the breach and then seized the so-called "Red Tower" (Swedish: Röde Torn) and planted a Swedish flag at the top.

Two of the defenders, Hans Sund and Jørgen Mekelberg volunteered to try to detonate the Red Tower's gunpowder magazine in a suicide attack, and the commander Jens Holgersen Ulfstand promised to provide for their families. Sund and Mekelberg succeeded in rolling a powder cart down to the magazine and then igniting it, causing a massive explosion which blew the Red Tower apart. A Danish chronicler wrote that 'the Swedes were thrown into the sky like crows or other birds, and not one of them came from there alive". It is reckoned that around 250 Swedish soldiers were killed in the explosion.

The explosion stopped the Swedish assault in its tracks, and the attackers were forced to retire and regroup. Despite their losses the Swedes continued the siege, but in the meantime Danish reinforcements under Daniel Rantzau were dispatched from Halland. Rantzau reached the Göta älv on 30 April, whereupon the invaders lifted the siege and withdrew to Västergötland. According to Danish reports, the Swedes had lost some 2300 men during the siege, while the Danish-Norwegian garrison had only lost 150, though its provisions and ammunition had been almost completely exhausted by the time the siege ended.

== Aftermath ==
The Swedish king, Erik XIV, was frustrated by his army's failure to take Bohus, and became convinced that the only explanation for the defeat was treachery within the Swedish ranks.

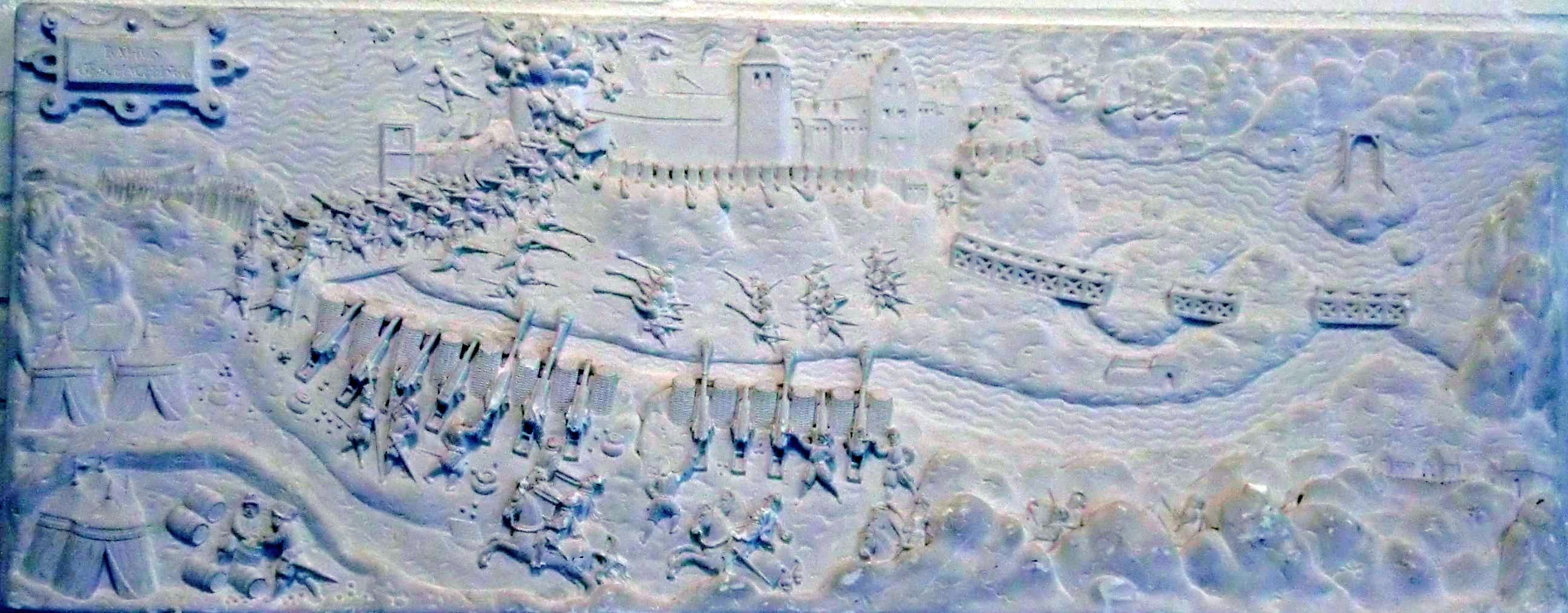
The Bohus Bang. Plaster copy of the marble relief from Fredrick II's sarcophagus in Roskilde Cathedral.

Erik had already been suspicious of the influential Sture Family, and used the failure of the Bohus siege as a pretext to have Nils Sture arrested for suspected treason. Nils was personally killed by King Erik in the dungeons of Uppsala Castle as part of the May 1567 Sture Murders. A lesser-known scapegoat for the debacle was the military quartermaster Bryngel Bengtsson, who was executed for embezzlement of the besieging army's provisions. As for Nils Boije, the overall commander, he was dismissed from his post and replaced by Charles de Mornay, but avoided further punishment, likely because he had previously distinguished himself by the successful capture of Varberg Fortress in 1565.

The Danish king, Frederick II, was delighted by news of the successful defence of Bohus. The 'Bohus Bang' is one of several scenes from the Northern Seven Years War depicted in marble relief on his sarcophagus in Roskilde Cathedral.

The Danish commander Ulfstand kept his promise to Hans Sund, and the farm Röset on Hisingen was granted to his descendants in perpetuity. It is not known if any equivalent grant was made to the relatives of Jørgen Mekelberg.

== See also ==
- Bohus Fortress
- Vyborg Bang
- Northern Seven Years War
