= Sten Sture's war against the Totts =

War between Tott dynasty and Sten Sture

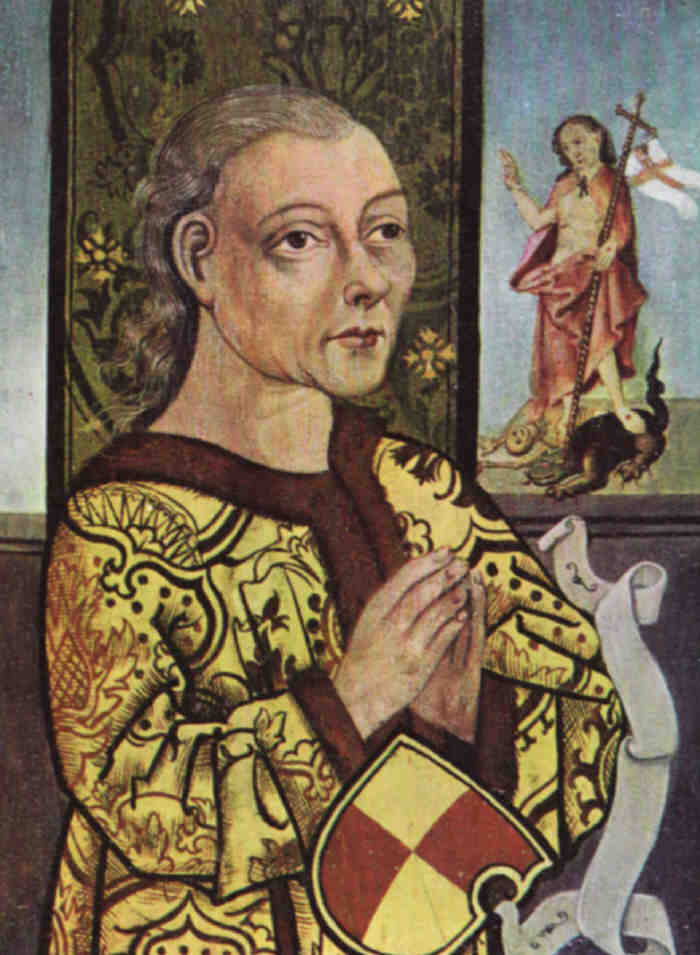
- Portrait of Ivar Axelsson Tott from the late 1400s.
Date	1487
Location	Sweden (Borgholm, Stegeborg, Raseborg)
Result	Swedish victory
Territorial changes	Borgholm and Öland are ceded to Sweden; Gotland is ceded to Denmark

Belligerents
(History of Sweden (800–1521)) Sweden; Sture faction	Tott dynasty

Commanders and leaders
(History of Sweden (800–1521)) Sten Sture the Elder (History of Sweden (800–1521)) Knut Eskilsson Banér (History of Sweden (800–1521)) Knut Posse	Ivar Axelsson Tott; Katarina Eriksdotter (surrendered); Erland Kagge (surrendered)

Units involved
Unknown	Raseborg's garrison Stegeborg's garrison Borgholm's garrison Visborg's garrison

Strength
Large amount of men 15 ships	Unknown

Casualties and losses
Unknown	Unknown

Sten Sture's war against the Totts (Swedish: Sten Stures kamp mot Tottarna or the Fight between Sten Sture and Ivar Axelsson (Kampen mellan Sten Sture och Ivar Axelsson) refers to a conflict between forces under Sten Sture the Elder and the Tott family in 1487.

== Background ==
Sten Sture the Elder

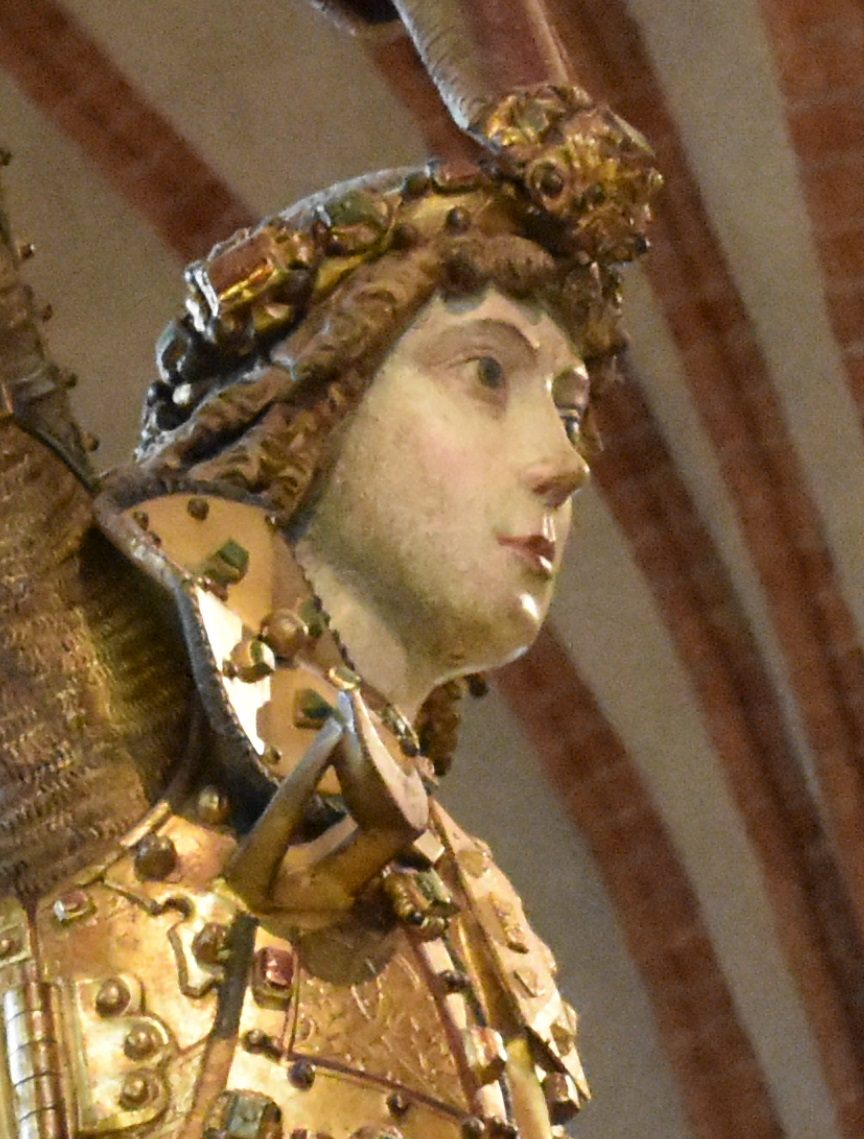
The face of St. George generally agreed to be a youth portrait of Sten Sture the Elder

Since the mid-1450s, the powerful Tott family had controlled several provinces and estates around the Baltic Sea, with Ivar Axelsson Tott being the master of Gotland. The Tott's could act more independently than other lords at the time, which gradually caused tensions between Ivar Axelsson and Sten Sture to increase. Ivar had previously attempted to depose Sten Sture in 1483, but this attempt ended in failure. The tensions quickly broke into open conflict after Ivar refused to stop harassing Dutch ships, and when it erupted, the Tott's held Gotland, along with Visborg, Öland, along with Borgholm, as well as Stegeborg, Kalmar, and Raseborg.

== War ==
Hostilities began in January 1487. A large army in Östergötland was mobilized by Sten Sture to fight the Tott's. After making it to Kalmar, he marched across the ice onto Öland where he besieged Borgholm. Ivar Axelsson defended the fortress, but when the ice melted and 15 Swedish ships began blocking the sea route to the fortress, Ivar escaped the fortress during nighttime. His wife was left behind, but she capitulated weeks later in exchange for privileges for her and her children.

Knut Eskilsson Baner and Knut Posse besieged Stegeborg and Raseborg respectively, the former fell on May 24 and Raseborg was conquered by Knut Posse. Ivar Axelsson surrendered after four ships under Knut Posse began to cruise outside of Visborg. Visborg and Gotland were handed over to Denmark, while Borgholm and Öland were ceded to Sweden after pressure by the Danish king.

== Aftermath ==
As a result of the war, the power that the Tott's held was crushed, with them never being able to regain it. Ivar Axelsson would later die the same year in his fortress Lillöhus, near modern-day Kristianstad.
