= Posse (surname) =

Posse is a German and Swedish surname. Notable people with the name include:

- Abel Posse, Argentine writer
- Amelie Posse, Swedish writer
- Arvid Posse, (1820–1901), Prime Minister of Sweden
- Arvid Mauritz Posse, (1792–1850), Swedish Prime Minister for Justice and Marshal of the Realm
- Hans Posse (1879–1942), special envoy of the Führermuseum
- Knut Posse (d. 1500), Swedish general
- Konstantin Posse, (1847–1928), Russian mathematician, student of Pafnuty Chebyshev
- Martín Posse (b. 1975), Argentine football manager and former player
- Nicolás Posse (b. 1965), Argentine politician and industrial engineer
- Vladimir Posse (1864–1940), Russian socialist journalist
