= Russo-Swedish War (1495–1497) =

First war between Russia and Sweden

Russo-Swedish War of 1495–1497
- Part of the Russo-Swedish wars
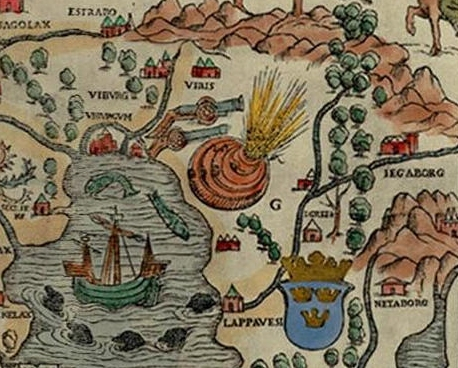
- The 1495 Vyborg Bang, as depicted by Olaus Magnus on the Carta marina
Date	1495–1497
Location	Finland; Gulf of Finland; Russia
Result	see § Result
Territorial changes	Status quo ante bellum

Belligerents
Grand Principality of Moscow	Kingdom of Sweden

Commanders and leaders
Ivan III; Daniil Shchenya; Vasily Kosoy; Vasily Shuisky; Andrey Chelyadnin	Sten Sture the Elder; Svante Nilsson; Knut Jönsson Posse

The Russo-Swedish War of 1495–1497, known in Sweden as the Stures' Russian War (Swedish: Sturarnas ryska krig) and in Russia as the First Swedish War (Russian: Первая Шведская война), was a border war between the Grand Principality of Moscow and the Kingdom of Sweden. Although the war was relatively short, and did not lead to any territorial changes, it has significance as the first war between Sweden and Moscow. Sweden earlier fought wars against the Novgorod Republic, before Novgorod was formally annexed to Moscow in 1478 – an event that led to the emergence of a unified Russian state.

== Background ==
=== Finnish–Karelian border ===
During the High Middle Ages, the Kingdom of Sweden had expanded across the Baltic Sea and conquered the region now known as Finland, and thereby came into contact with the Republic of Novgorod. The border between Sweden and the Republic of Novgorod was fixed by the 1322 Treaty of Nöteborg, which defined it as beginning at Viborg Castle on the Gulf of Finland and then running north, up the middle of the Karelian Isthmus and across Savonia to terminate at the Gulf of Bothnia, probably in the area of the Pyhäjoki River, although the treaty is rather vague with regard to the sparsely populated northern segment of the border.

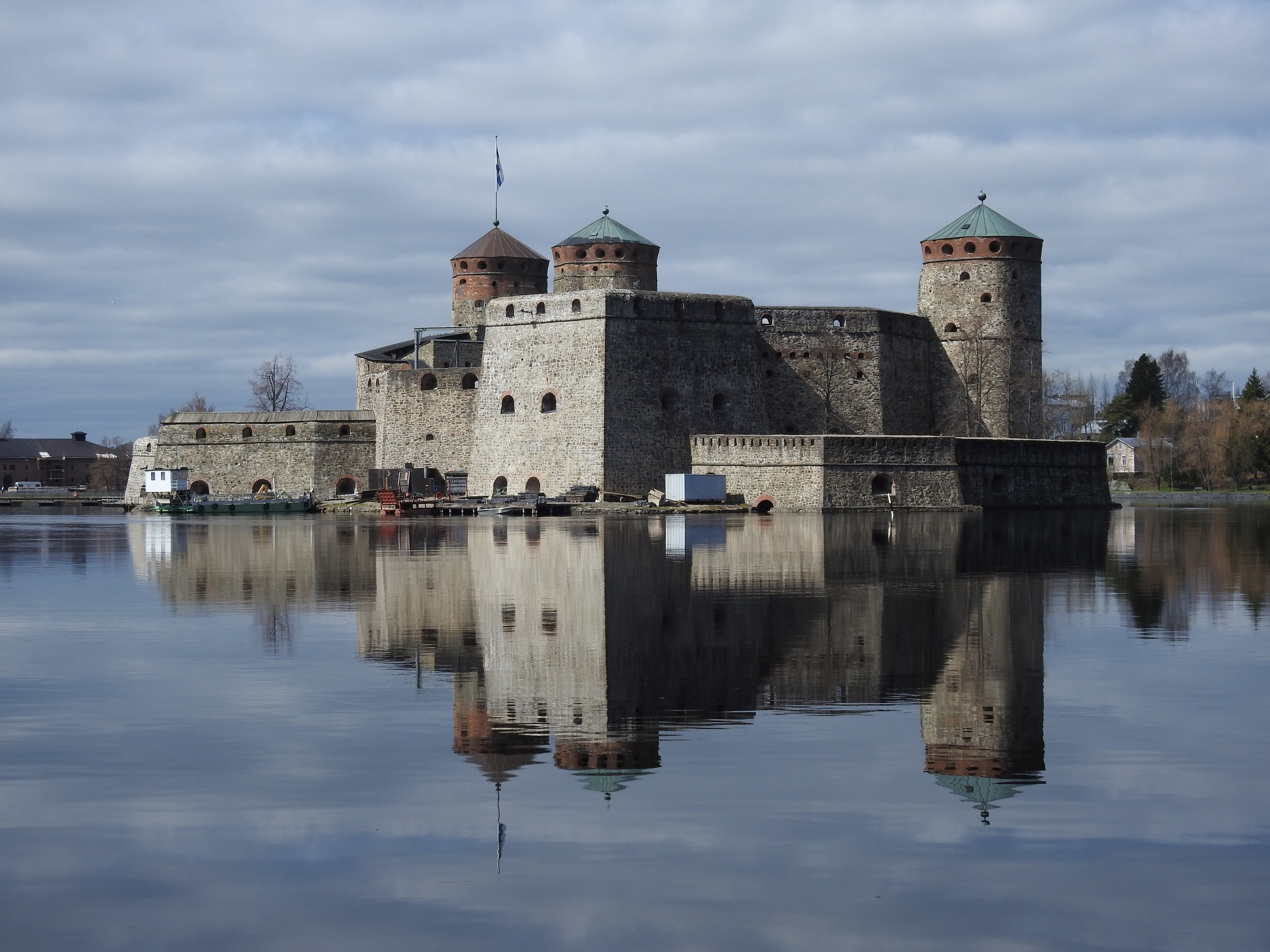
Olavinlinna Castle. Its construction in 1475 in eastern Savonia, on territory assigned to Novgorod by the Treaty of Nöteborg, was one of the main casus belli for the war.

Despite the signing of the Treaty, conflicts recurred periodically between Sweden and Novgorod through the fourteenth and fifteenth centuries. The Novgorodians were aggrieved by Swedish settlement on their side of the border, particularly in northern Ostrobothnia and eastern Savonia; the building of a Swedish castle at Olavinlinna (Swedish: Olofsborg) in 1475 was especially provocative.

However, Novgorod was not in a position to seek redress for its grievances as the republic was by then in terminal decline. In 1472 it was defeated by its southeastern neighbour, the Grand Principality of Moscow, and forced to accept vassal status, and in 1478, Grand Prince Ivan III formally dissolved the republic and annexed Novgorod to the grand principality.

=== Sweden and the Kalmar Union ===
In 1397 Sweden had, together with the Kingdoms of Denmark and Norway, formed the tripartite union known as the Kalmar Union. However, by the late fifteenth century its position in the Union had been thrown into question. From 1471 it was ruled by a regent (Swedish: riksföreståndare), Sten Sture the Elder and was de facto independent, but theoretically it was still part of the Union, a large proportion of its political class favoured close ties with Denmark–Norway. Successive Danish–Norwegian kings encouraged this unionist sentiment to try to force Sten to acknowledge royal sovereignty and to re-integrate Sweden fully into the Union.

In 1493, King Hans attempted to put further pressure on Sten by concluding an alliance with Grand Prince Ivan, promising that if he managed to take control of Sweden he would restore the Russo-Swedish border to the line stipulated by the Treaty of Nöteborg. Sten thus found himself menaced by hostile powers to both east and west.

For his part, Ivan did not entirely trust the promise of territorial concessions from Hans. Calculating that the Swedes would be too preoccupied with the threat of a Danish–Norwegian invasion to deal with a Muscovite incursion into Finland, he decided to seize the vital Swedish border fortress at Viborg and thus present both the Swedes and Danes with a fait accompli.

== War ==
In late 1495, Ivan sent Princes Daniil Shchenya and Vasily Shuisky to lay siege to Viborg Castle (now in Vyborg, Russia), whose commander Knut Jönsson Posse happened to be married to one of Sten Sture's cousins. After a siege of three months, the Muscovites attempted to storm the castle in late November, but a massive explosion killed a large number of the attackers and stopped the assault in its tracks, and the siege was lifted soon afterward. The explosion went down in Swedish and Finnish folklore as 'the Viborg Bang'.

The Muscovites subsequently switched tactics, and rather than trying to seize Swedish castles they instead attempted to force them into submission by ravaging Finland. Over the winter of 1495-6 Muscovite forces under Vasily Kosoy and Andrey Chelyadnin devastated the country around Tavastehus (Finnish: Hämeenlinna), while other Muscovite raiding parties managed to get all the way to the gates of Åbo (Finnish: Turku), which was a major humiliation for Sten.

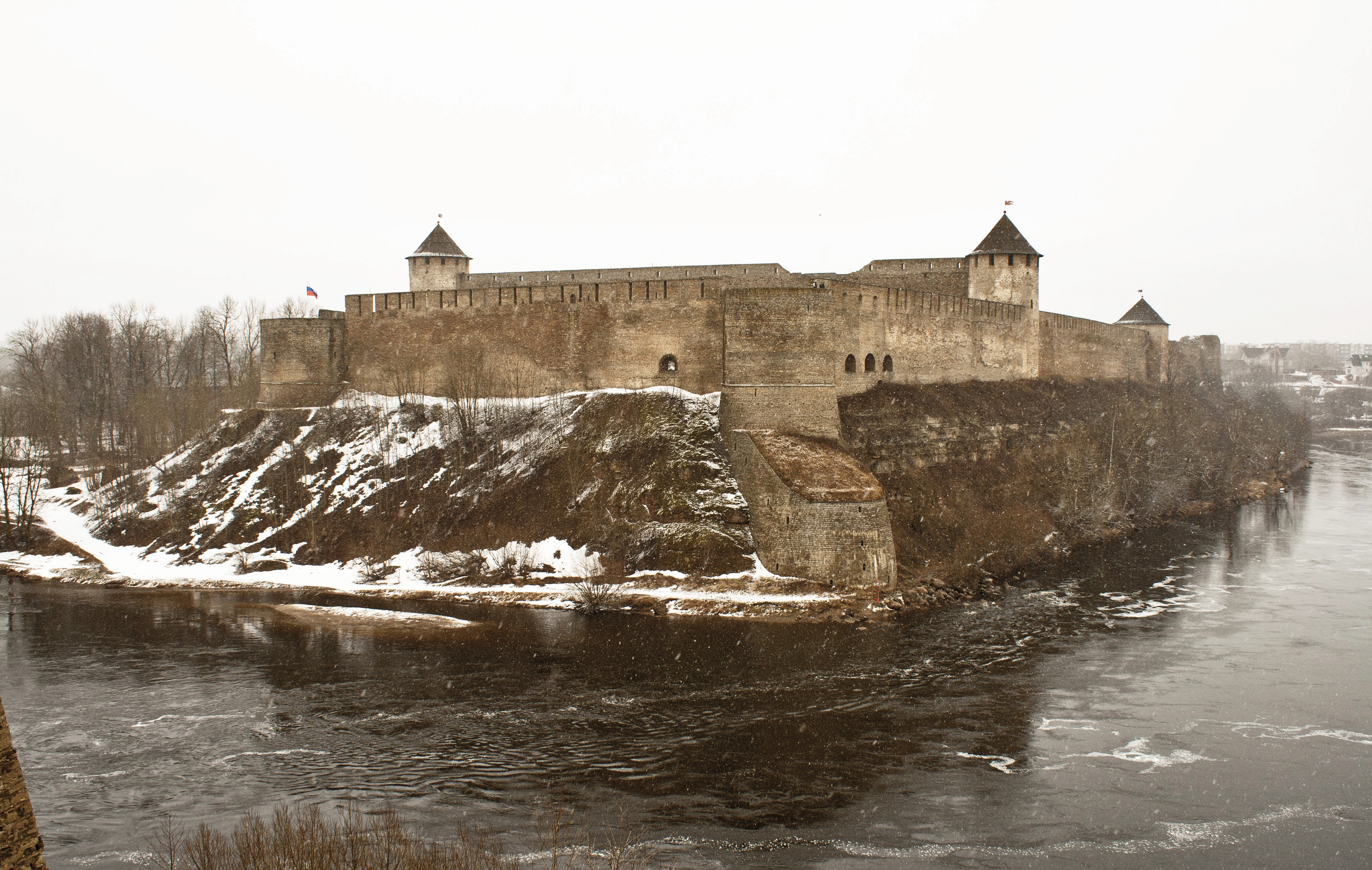
Ivangorod Fortress as it appears today.

The Swedish regent responded by declaring the conflict to be a holy war, as the Muscovites, being Orthodox Christians, were considered heretics by the Catholic Swedes. In summer 1496 he succeeded in getting Pope Alexander VI to issue a papal bull officially recognising the war as a crusade against heretics, which was a propaganda boost for Sten and enabled him to impose extra taxes to fund the war effort. These taxes were however very unpopular in Sweden, especially for the Swedish Church, which was already suspicious of Sten for his efforts to encroach upon its traditional freedoms and blamed him for the outbreak of the war with Moscow.

In August a Swedish force under the command of Svante Nilsson sailed across the Gulf of Finland to attack Ivangorod, a castle which Ivan III had built to protect Ingria against the Livonian Order in what is now Estonia and Latvia. The castle was successfully captured and razed, whereupon Svante returned to Åbo to await reinforcements from Sweden.

Sten Sture himself arrived in Finland in early autumn 1496 with a fresh army, planning to overwinter at Åbo and then mount a campaign into Ingria in 1497. However, upon arrival he fell out with Svante Nilsson, who promptly sailed to Sweden and aligned himself with the unionist opposition against Sten. Given Svante's status as the general who had captured Ivangorod, this defection was a major blow to Sten, and in November he was forced to return to Sweden himself to address the gathering unrest against him. He also offered to make peace with Moscow, and a six-year truce was agreed upon on 3 March 1497, bringing the war to an end.

== Result ==
In modern historiography, there are different assessments of the war. Several works determine that the war ended with a Swedish victory. However, Russian historian Alexander Filyushkin disagrees with them, determining that it was a draw. Another historian, Yuri Alekseev, expresses a similar opinion, he points out that the war did not lead the parties to a decisive result, but clarifies that the war may have ended in a small favor for the Russians. Finnish historian Lena Huldén says that Russia "lacked success" in the war.

== Sources ==
- Adolfsson, Mats (2007). Svenska uppror / [2] Fogdemakt och bondevrede : 1500- 1718. Internet Archive. Stockholm : Natur och Kultur. ISBN 978-91-27-35690-0.
- Moose, Christina (2005). Great events from history. The Renaissance & early modern era, 1454-1600. Salem Pr Inc. ISBN 978-1587652141.
- Alexeev, Yuri (2009). Походы русских войск при Иване III [Campaigns of Russian troops under Ivan III] (in Russian). St. Petersburg University Press. ISBN 978-5-288-04840-1.
- Filyushkin, Alexander (2018). Первое противостояние России и Европы [The first confrontation between Russia and Europe] (in Russian). Series: Что такое Россия? (What is Russia?). Новое литературное обозрение. ISBN 978-5-4448-1029-3.
- Palme, Sven Ulric, Sten Sture den äldre, AB Wahlström & Widstrand 1950, Stockholm
- Suvanto, S: Suomen poliittinen asema Sten Sturen vanhemman valtakautena vuosina 1483–1497 (Finland's political position during Sten Sture the Elder's Rule, 1483–1497), Suomen historiallinen seura 1952, Helsinki
- Jaakkola, J: Suomen myöhäiskeskiaika II (Finland's Late Middle Ages), Werner Söderström OY 1959
- Suomen kansan historia I (History of the Finnish people), Otava 1964, Helsinki
- Julku, K: Suomen itärajan synty (The emergence of the eastern Finnish border), Pohjoissuomen historiallinen yhdistys 1987, Rovaniemi
- Finlands historia I, Schildts Förlags AB 1992, Esbo
- Harrison, D: Gud vill det! Nordiska korsfarare under medeltiden, Ordfront förlag 2005, Stockholm
- Sveriges historia 1350–1600, Norstedts 2010, Stockholm
- Huldén, Lena [in Swedish] (2008). Med blod och svärd: 1000-1520 [WIth blood and sword: 1000-1520] (in Swedish). Schildt. ISBN 9789515018205.
- Brockington, William S. (2022). "Danish-Swedish Wars". EBSCO Information Services.
