= Third Swedish Crusade =

13th-century military campaign

- Part of the Northern Crusades and the Swedish–Novgorodian Wars
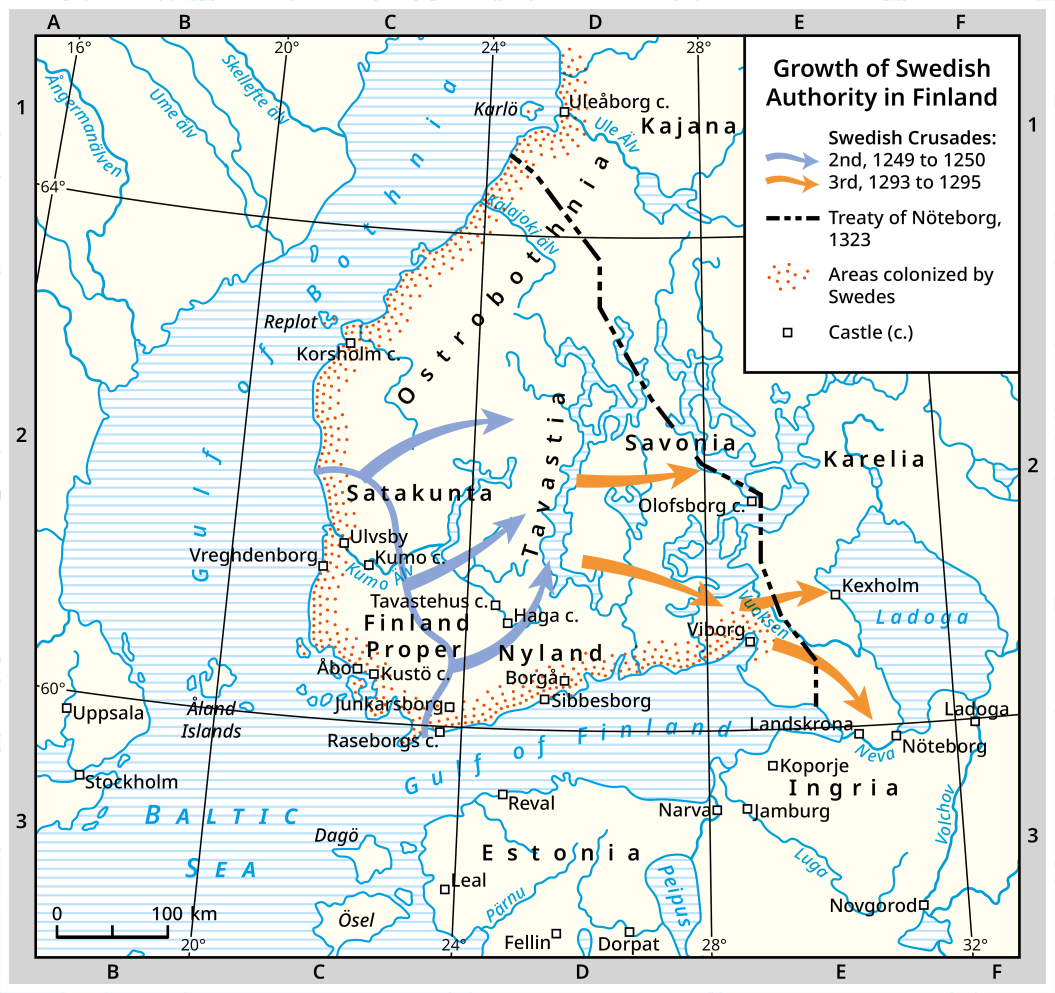
- Swedish eastern expansion in Finland, 1249–1323
Date	1293–1295
Location	Finland
Result	Swedish victory
Territorial changes	Swedish border is further expanded eastwards

Belligerents
Sweden	Novgorod; Pagan Karelians

Commanders and leaders
Birger Magnusson; Torkel Knutsson; Sigge Lake †; Bishop Petrus	Roman Glebovich

Strength
Unknown	Unknown

The Third Swedish Crusade to Finland was a Swedish military expedition against the pagan Karelians from 1293 to 1295 in which the Swedes successfully expanded their borders eastwards and gained further control of their lands in Finland. After the crusade, Western Karelia remained under Swedish rule until the Treaty of Nystad in 1721.

== Background ==
The Third Swedish Crusade followed the possibly mythical First Crusade and the Second Crusade to Finland. Viborg Castle was established in 1293 on the site of a destroyed Karelian fort as the easternmost outpost of the medieval Kingdom of Sweden.

The name of the expedition is largely anachronistic, and it was a part of the Northern Crusades. According to Erik's Chronicle (Erikskrönikan) the reason behind the expedition was pagan intrusions into Christian territories. According to Erik's Chronicle, the Swedes conquered 14 hundreds from the Karelians.

Karelians had also been engaged in a destructive expedition to Sweden in 1257 which led Valdemar, King of Sweden (1250–1275) to request Pope Alexander IV to declare a crusade against them, which he agreed.

Birger Magnusson, King of Sweden (1290 to 1318), stated in a letter of 4 March 1295 that the motive of the crusade was long-time banditry and looting in the Baltic Sea region by Karelians, and the fact that they had taken Swedes and other travellers as captives and then tortured them.

== 1293 ==
In the spring, a large fleet sailed to Finland under the command of Torkel Knutsson. Their goal was to move Sweden's border further east. The timing was well chosen, since the Tatars had been attacking both Moscow and Novgorod.

The target of the Swedish attack was the harbour and marketplace at Suomenvedenpohja, later known as Vyborg. The place is located at the western outlet of the Vouksen, a now-dried arm, and is the key to the West Karelians' trade and exchange with the outside world, even before the arrival of the Swedes there was an older Karelian fortification there. A Swedish hegemony over the place would mean that Sweden and the Catholic Church's control over West Karelia would be secured.

This campaign is not particularly well described in the chronicles. The Swedes set up a stronghold at Suomenvedenpohja, under apparently peaceful circumstances. There are indications that the Swedish side was also building a new stronghold at Ladoga, at the place where today's Taipale is located. The mount is named Korela, but it would not remain for much longer. In 1310, the Novgorodians built a fortified settlement on the foundation of Korela.

The Swedish army sailed home in the autumn and left a garrison in the new stronghold. We do not know who Viborg's first chieftain was, but the Rim chronicle says that he "dared to see an angry heathen in his sight", which probably means that he was a brave man.

== 1294 ==
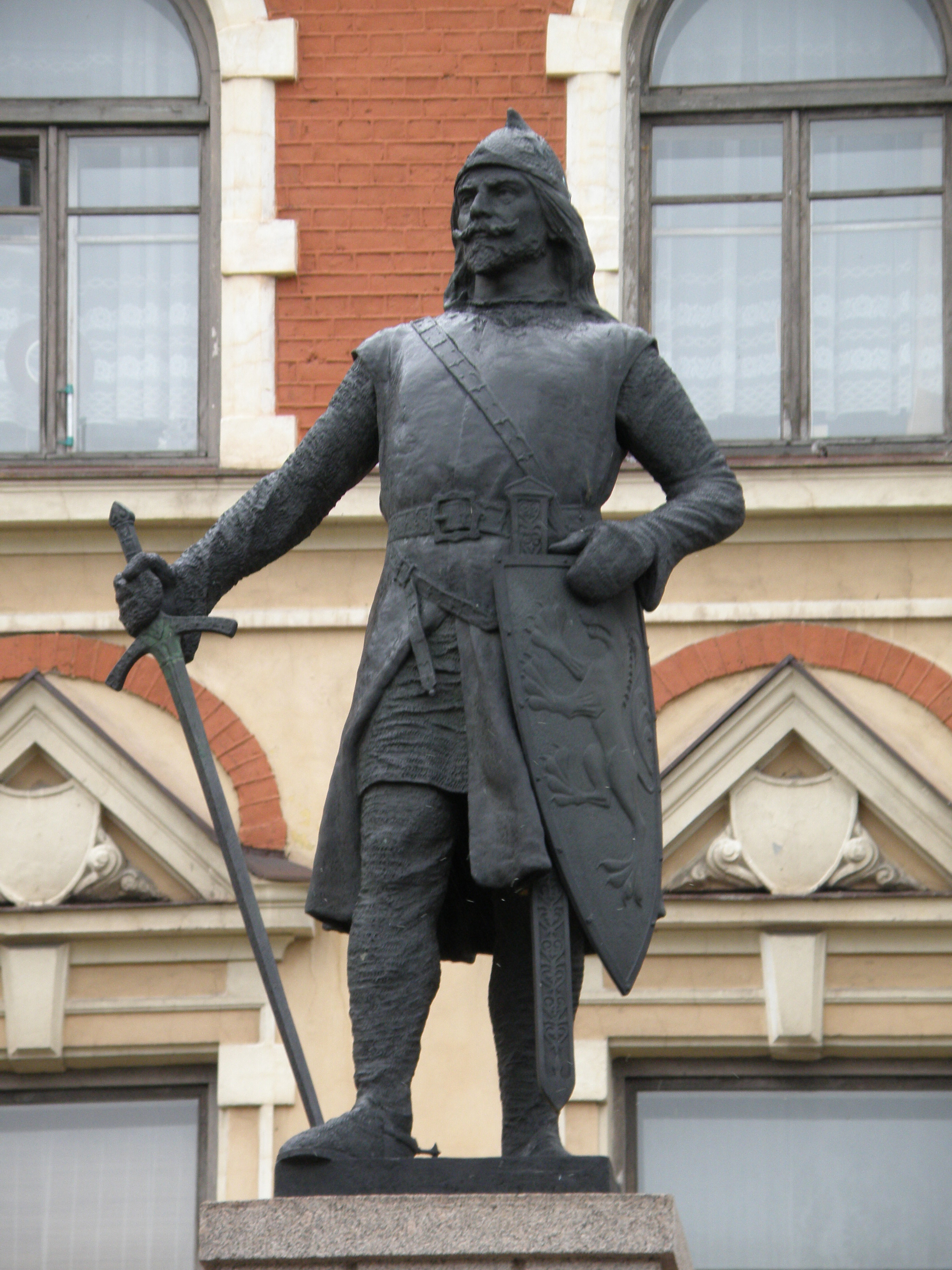
Torkel Knutsson statue in Vyborg

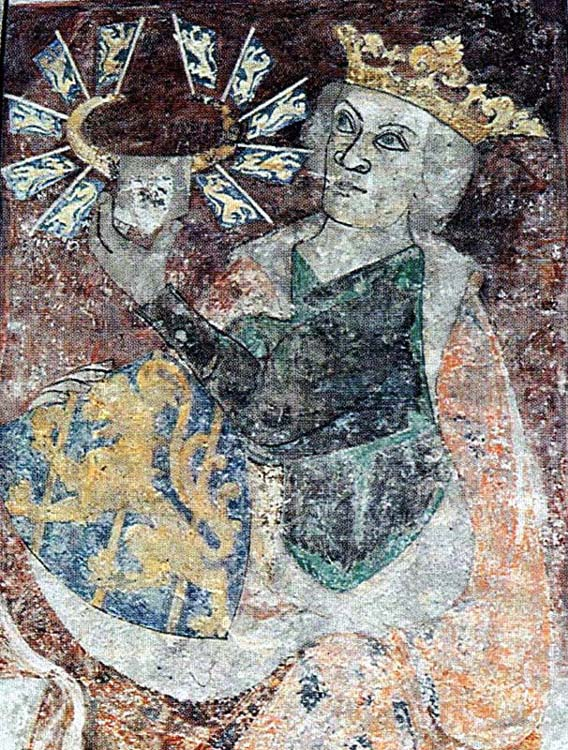
Birger Magnusson (r. 1280–1318)

=== Siege of Viborg ===
In March 1294, the Novgorodian troops led by Roman Glebovich (son of Gleb Rostislavich of Smolensk) reached Viborg and quickly moved against one of the towers in the fortress, they put six large trebuchets which in turn threw boulders against the walls, and quickly organized an assault across the ice against the fortress. The Novgorodians led the assault against Viborg on 30 March, but the weather saved the Swedes, as a mild and warm wind came from the south-west which partly melted the ice and broke it, which made an assault impossible without boats.

It is likely that within the defenders there were praises to Saint Olaf and Saint Mary, the Swedes saw the weather changes as the saints confirming Viborg as being Swedish. According to the chronicle, one of the commanders named Ivan Klekatjevitch died. After the failed assault, the Novgorodians were forced to retreat.

=== Swedish counterattack ===
Later in the spring, a fleet arrived from Sweden and soon they went on the offensive. Now the goal was Kexholm. If the Swedes were able to settle there well, the Ladoga Karel would also fall under Swedish control. After an assault, Kexholm was conquered and the Swedes established a garrison in the fortress under the command of Sigge Lake. The main part of the army would then return to Viborg and then Sweden.

== 1295 ==
The attack on Kexholm was a killing blow against Novgorod, it is likely that the garrison that the Swedes defeated in 1294 consisted of Novgorodians and the ties between Ladoga Karelia and Novgorod are stronger than those between West Karelia and Novgorod.

Before the ice conditions allowed for Swedish reinforcements, an army from Novgorod besieged Kexholm. In the fortress, supplies quickly ran out, and when starvation became too severe, the garrison made a desperate attempt to break through the Novgorodian lines in which during the beginning the Swedes were victorious, but due to their exhaustion the defenders quickly fell along with their commander, Sigge Lake. Only two Swedes managed to escape with the others being killed or captured.

The news of the defeat at Kexholm probably did not create any major panic in Sweden. They were very satisfied with the previous years' successes in the east, which had radically strengthened Swedish self-esteem. However, the limit had not yet been reached for the Swedish expansion to the east and almost 30 years of war would be fought. The war would be waged with varying intensity. No source tells us anything about war events along Finland's eastern border during the period 1296 to 1299. It may therefore be reasonable to assume that the fighting is down to the year 1300, when it begins again in full force.

== Aftermath ==
The Crusade led by Torkel Knutsson led to the Swedish border in Finland being extended further eastwards, with the Karelians defeated they began paying taxes to the Swedes and were Christianized.

The Swedish regent in 1300 sent another army that built a fortress called Landskrona on an island in the Neva River. The Swedes initially repelled a siege of the fortress but after leaving a garrison behind it was seized by an army from Novgorod in the following year and razed.

== See also ==
- Neva campaign – War between Sweden and Novgorod

== Other sources ==
- Linna Martti, ed. (1989) Suomen Varhaiskeskiajan Lähteitä (Historian Ystäväin liitto ry) ISBN 9789519600611.
