= Viborg Bang =

1495 explosion in Viborg

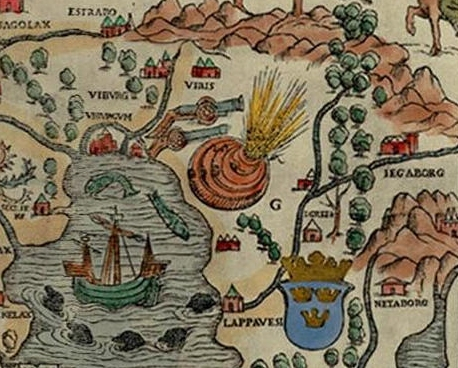
Olaus Magnus depicted the Viborg Bang on his Carta Marina.

The Viborg Bang (Swedish: Viborgska Smällen, Finnish: Viipurin pamaus), as it is traditionally called in Swedish historiography, was a possibly legendary explosion which occurred at Viborg Castle in November 1495. It occurred during an assault on the castle by forces of the Grand Duchy of Moscow and is supposed to have had a crushing effect upon the morale of the besiegers, causing the attack to fail.

== Background ==
The explosion took place during the Siege of Viborg, the opening engagement of the Russo-Swedish War of 1495-7. The war was essentially a border dispute between the Kingdom of Sweden, which at the time extended across the Baltic Sea to encompass what is now Finland and parts of Russia, and the Grand Duchy of Moscow. Sweden was at the time led by the regent Sten Sture the Elder, under whom the kingdom found itself in an ambiguous position, de facto independent but theoretically still part of the Kalmar Union along with the Kingdoms of Denmark and Norway. The Danish-Norwegian kings made periodic efforts to re-integrate Sweden into the Union, and in the early 1490s King Hans attempted to put pressure on Sten by concluding an alliance with Sweden's eastern neighbour Moscow, then ruled by Grand Prince Ivan III. Ivan calculated that Sten would be too preoccupied by the threat from Denmark-Norway to deal with a Muscovite incursion into Swedish Finland, and in late 1495 sent an army to seize the vital border castle at Viborg.

The garrison at Viborg was commanded by Knut Jönsson Posse, an aristocrat and seasoned commander who was also a strong supporter of Sten Sture, his wife being one of the regent's cousins. In late November, the Muscovites attempted to storm the castle.

== The Bang ==
According to traditional Swedish accounts of the siege, Posse rigged one of the castle's gunpowder magazines to explode and then deliberately weakened the defences in that sector in order to encourage the Muscovites to attack. When the besiegers duly stormed the weakened area of the walls, Posse detonated the magazine, causing a massive explosion which killed a large number of Muscovite soldiers and prompted the survivors to abandon the assault and lift the siege. If the story is true, then this would be one of the earliest recorded instances of the use of explosive mines in European siege warfare.

Some versions of the story claim that the explosion had such a dramatic effect upon Muscovite morale because the assault took place on St Andrew's Day (30 November), and the superstitious soldiers interpreted the flash of light as a miraculous apparition of the St Andrew's Cross. This retelling was clearly inspired by the existing Swedish legend of the appearance of a golden cross in the heavens during St Erik's apocryphal Finnish crusade.

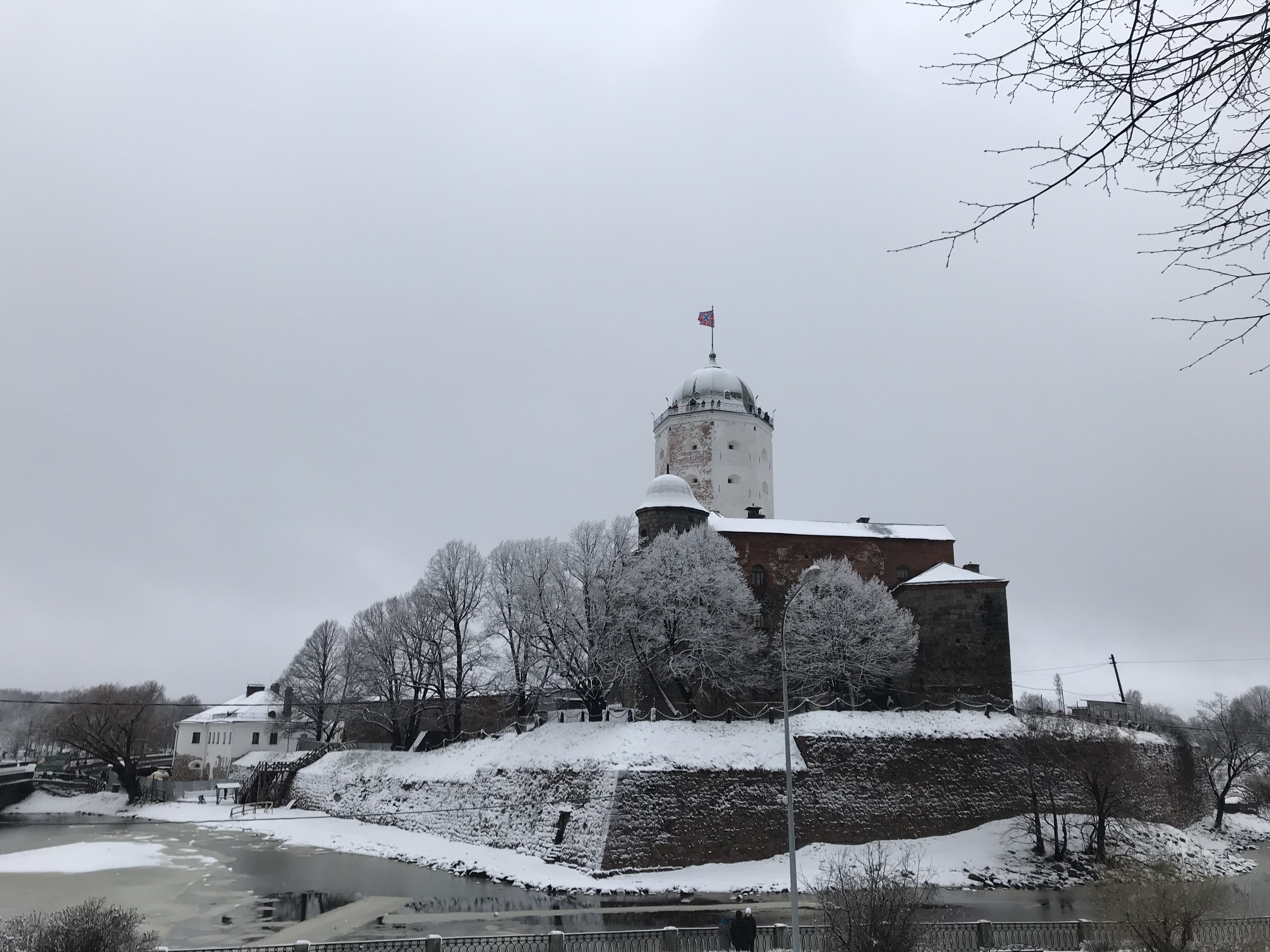
Viborg Castle as it appears today.

Other accounts have it that the Muscovites were so terrified by the explosion because they believed it to be the work of black magic. Indeed, Danish propaganda seized on the story of the Viborg Bang to claim that Posse must be in league with the Devil; Posse was already loathed in Denmark because he had played a leading role in the great Swedish victory over the Danes at Brunkeberg in 1471.

Despite the fame of the Viborg Bang, there is some doubt as to whether it actually occurred in the way described in the legend. Posse's letters reporting on his successful defence of Viborg make no reference to any such explosion, and nor does the near-contemporary Sture Chronicle, which simply claims that Posse slew a large number of Russians at Viborg, but without specifying the circumstances. There are no direct references in surviving source material to a massive explosion in connection with Viborg prior to 1539, when the Swedish polymath Olaus Magnus depicted it on his famous map the Carta Marina, and the actual term 'Viborg Bang' was not used until much later.

== See also ==
- Bohus Bang
- Russo-Swedish War (1495-1497)
- Knut Jönsson Posse

== Sources ==
- Ericson, Lars (2003). Martin Hårdstedt; Per Iko; Ingvar Sjöblom; Gunnar Åselius (eds.). Svenska slag. Värnamo. pp. 33–40.
- Larsson, Lars-Olof (1997). Kalmarunionens tid: Från drottning Margareta till Kristian II. Stockholm. pp. 358–62.
- "Knut Posse". Svenskt biografiskt lexikon.
