= Knut Posse =

Swedish general (died 1500)

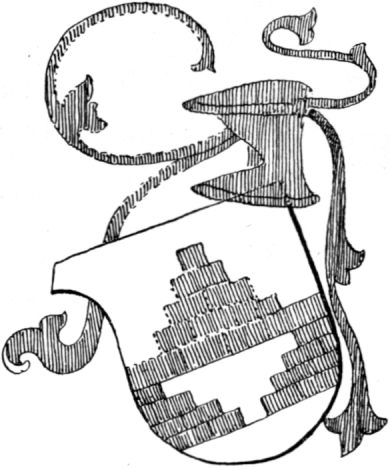
- Knut Posse's coat of arms
- Born: early 1440s Stockholm, Sweden
- Died: March 25, 1500; Kastelholm Castle, Åland
- Burial place: Turku Cathedral
- Relatives: Posse family
- Military career
- Allegiance: Sweden
- Rank: General
- Commands: Commandant of Stockholm
- Conflicts: Dano-Swedish War (1470–1471); Battle of Brunkeberg; Sten Sture's war against the Totts (1487); Russo-Swedish War (1495–1497); Siege of Viborg (1495); Assault on Vatikivi

Knut Jönsson Posse (Finnish: Nuutti Posse; died 25 March 1500) was a Swedish general in Sweden and Finland remembered for the Viborg Bang (1495) and for his surprise attack on the Danish Army at the Battle of Brunkeberg (1471).

== Early life ==
Knut Posse was born at an unknown date, no later than the first half of the 1440s. His parents were Jöns Lagepose and Märta Knutsdotter (Tre rosor). He is first mentioned as a child in 1452, in a letter of indulgence for parents and their sons.

== Military career ==
Knut Posse was appointed bailiff of Stockholm Castle in 1466 and in 1472 was bailiff at Hämeenlinna Castle. In 1490 he was appointed courtier at Kastelholm Castle, and in 1495, Posse was governor of Viborg Castle.

=== Battle of Brunkeberg ===
In 1471, Regent Sten Sture ordered Posse to load the garrison of Stockholm Castle onto boats to ready a surprise attack on the Danish and German Army of King Christian I of Denmark. His order was to attack the Danes in the rear from Stadsholmen. The Danes would then be attacked on three sides: Sten Sture would attack from the south, Nils Sture would flank the Danes and attack from the rear, and Posse would attack the Danes from the east flank. The Danish were completely surprised by Posse's attack. Soon after the battle started, Christian I sent more troops to reinforce their position near Sankta Klara kloster. The Danish Armies were no match for Posse's men, whom he led from the front. Posse's legs were hit by several Danish arrows.

=== Vyborg Bang ===
From 1495 to 1497, Posse was governor of Viborg Castle, and commanded the garrison during the 1495 siege by forces of the Grand Principality of Moscow. He successfully defeated the much larger Russian army by luring the attackers onto the walls and detonating an explosive mine under their feet, in what became known as the Viborg Bang (Swedish: Viborgska Smällen; Finnish: Viipurin pamaus).

== Personal life and death ==
Posse married Birgitta Gustafsdotter (Sture), daughter of councillor Gustaf Algotsson (Sture) and Märta Ulfsdotter (Sparre af Hjulsta and Ängsö) in her second marriage. She was previously the wife of David Bengtsson Oxenstierna. Their marriage was childless.

Paulus Juusten wrote in his episcopal chronicle that Posse was "rebus bellicis strenuus, in consiliis sagacissimus" (energetic in matters of war, the wisest in counsel).

Posse died in 1500 at Kastelholm Castle. He was buried at Turku Cathedral.
