= Torkel Knutsson =

Swedish lord (died 1306)

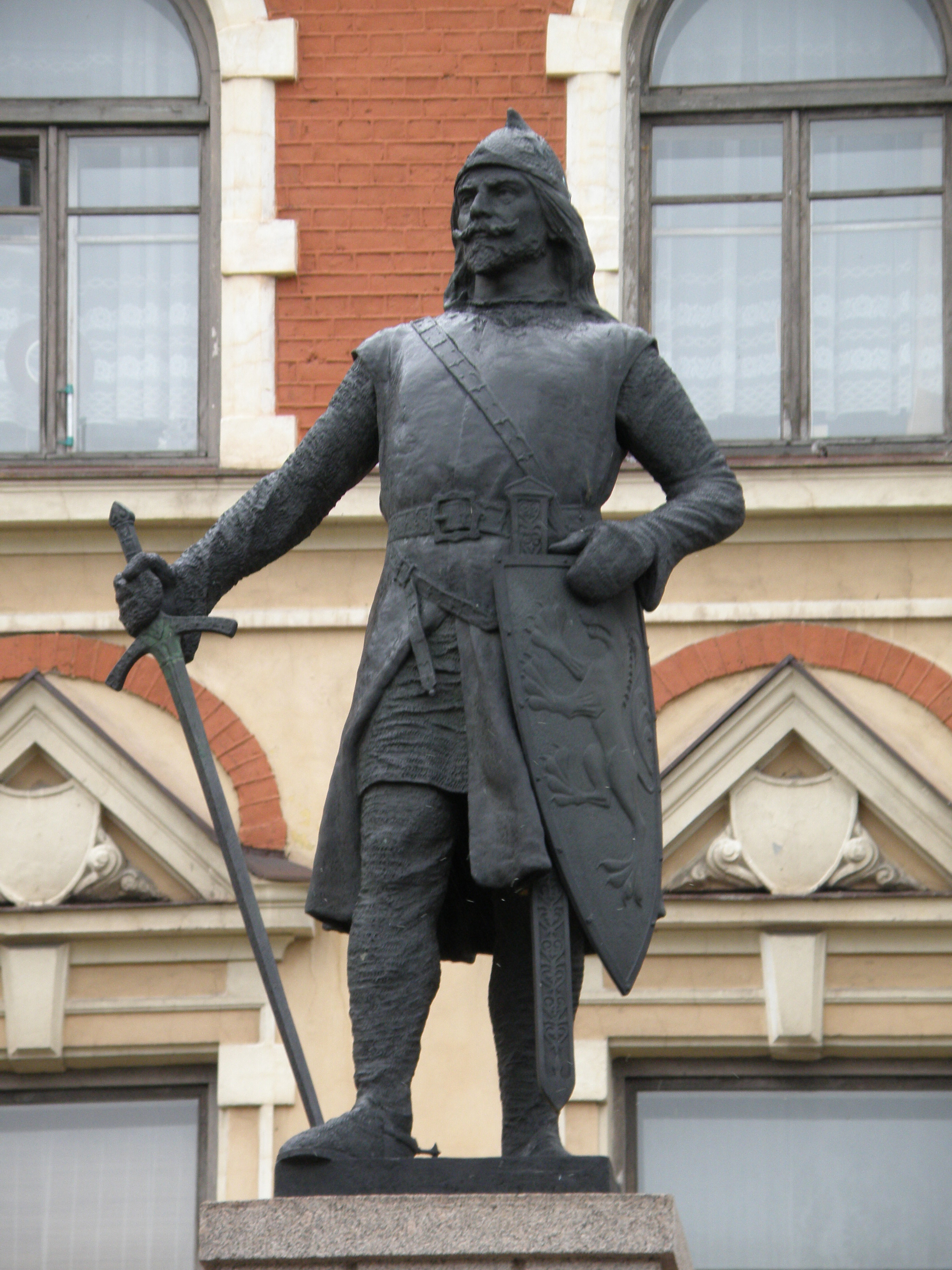
Statue of Knutsson in Vyborg, Russia.

Torkel (Tyrgils or Torgils) Knutsson (died 1306) was Lord High Constable of Sweden, member of the Privy Council of Sweden (Riksråd), and virtual ruler of Sweden during the early reign of King Birger Magnusson (1280–1321).

== Biography ==
Torkel's coat of arms

Torkel hailed from an old noble family of West Geatish ancestry and was related to the House of Bjälbo (Folkungaätten). He was first mentioned in 1282. In documents from 1288, he is mentioned as a knight and a member of the privy council (Riksråd).

=== Career ===
Before his death, King Magnus Ladulås (c. 1240 – 1290) ordered his kinsman, Torkel Knutsson, the Constable of the Realm, to be the guardian of his son Birger. When King Magnus Ladulås died, Torkel became regent for the underage Birger Magnusson (1280–1321).

When Tavastland had been attacked by the Republic of Novgorod, in 1292, Torkel led the Third Swedish Crusade against Novgorod, in 1293 and conquered parts of Karelia, where he founded the stronghold of Vyborg Castle. In 1299–1300, he led an attack against the Novgorodians, and he founded the Landskrona fortress on Okhta river at the influx of Neva.

The old trade treaties with Lübeck were re-established, on condition that the town did not provide Novgorod with weapons or provisions. Torkel showed the same concerns about Swedish domestic politics. During his regency, the law of Uppland was established. He acted as Birger Jarl had done in the conflict against the church, in order to abolish the clergy's tax exemption. The clergy's discontent became apparent in 1303.

In the struggles between King Birger Magnusson and his brothers, Erik Magnusson, Duke of Svealand (c. 1282 – 1318) and Valdemar Magnusson, Duke of Finland (c. 1282 – 1318), Torkel was faithfully on the king's side. At Torkel's castle Aranäs, in 1304, the two dukes had to sign a declaration that they would neither in Sweden, nor abroad, work against the king nor cause him harm. In spite of this declaration, the two dukes fled abroad and with the support of the Norwegian king Haakon V of Norway, they attacked Västergötland. Torkel helped the king conquer the castle of Nyköping, which belonged to Duke Eric, and in Kolsäter (1305), he forced the two dukes to sign a declaration that they would not cause any harm to Torkel either.

When the power of the dukes was on the rise again, Torkel had to reconcile with the church, and he ordered a charter on the renewal of the church's old rights, in 1305. However, Torkel was finally struck by the vengeance of his enemies. The dukes managed to win the trust of the king and poisoned the king's mind against Torkel. In December 1305, King Birger and the dukes arrived at Torkel's estate of Lena (where formerly the Battle of Lena had taken place) in Västergötland, and arrested Torkel who was taken to Stockholm in chains. In February 1306, the marshal was decapitated. His body was interred at the place of execution. It was later moved and buried at the Franciscan church in Stockholm.

=== Family ===
Torkel was married twice. His first wife, whose origins are unknown, gave him a daughter Kristina Torgilsdotter, who married Torkel's godson and later enemy Duke Valdemar. She appears to have been repudiated by the duke upon her father's execution, as Valdemar is soon reported to have married with Ingeborg Eriksdottir of Norway. Torkel's second wife was countess Hedvig of Ravensberg.

== Remembrance ==
Torkel's powerful personality and tragic end has been the matter of poetry, in e.g. B. v. Beskow's tragedy Torkel Knutsson. A statue of Torkel (by Ville Vallgren) was raised, in 1908, on the square Raatihuoneentori (Sw. Rådhustorget) in Viipuri (Ru. Vyborg), then part of the Grand Duchy of Finland.

== Other sources ==
- Lagerqvist, Lars O. (1982) Sverige och dess regenter under 1000 år (Stockholm: Albert Bonniers Förlag) ISBN 91-0-041538-3
