= List of wars between Russia and Sweden =

This is a list of wars between Russia, Sweden and their predecessor states.

== Wars between Sweden and the Novgorod Republic ==
Date	Conflict	Kingdom of Sweden and allies	Novgorod Republic and allies	Result
1164	Battle of the Voronezhka River	(History of Sweden (800–1521)) Kingdom of Sweden	Novgorod Republic	Novgorodian victory
1236–1237	Tavastian uprising	(History of Sweden (800–1521)) Kingdom of Sweden	Tavastians: Novgorod Republic; Karelians	Swedish victory
1238–1239 or c. 1249–1250	Second Swedish Crusade	(History of Sweden (800–1521)) Kingdom of Sweden	Tavastians: Novgorod Republic	Swedish victory
1240	Battle of the Neva	(History of Sweden (800–1521)) Kingdom of Sweden: Finns; Tavastians; Norwegians	Novgorod Republic	Novgorodian victory
1293–1295	Third Swedish Crusade	(History of Sweden (800–1521)) Kingdom of Sweden	Novgorod Republic	Swedish victory
1300–1301	Neva campaign	(History of Sweden (800–1521)) Kingdom of Sweden	Novgorod Republic	Novgorodian victory
1311–1314	Häme War	(History of Sweden (800–1521)) Kingdom of Sweden	Novgorod Republic	Inconclusive
1318	Attack on Åbo	(History of Sweden (800–1521)) Kingdom of Sweden	Novgorod Republic	Inconclusive
1321–1323	Kexholm War	(History of Sweden (800–1521)) Kingdom of Sweden	Novgorod Republic	Inconclusive: Treaty of Nöteborg
1338–1339	Sten Bielke's war against Novgorod	(History of Sweden (800–1521)) Kingdom of Sweden	Novgorod Republic	Swedish victory
1348–1351	Magnus Eriksson's crusade	Kingdom of Sweden	Novgorod Republic	Novgorodian victory
1377	Attack on Oulu	(History of Sweden (800–1521)) Kingdom of Sweden	Novgorod Republic	Swedish victory
1395	Storming of Yam	(History of Sweden (800–1521)) Kingdom of Sweden	Novgorod Republic	Novgorodian victory
1396	Northern Ladoga Campaign	(History of Sweden (800–1521)) Kingdom of Sweden	Novgorod Republic	Inconclusive
1404	Swedish-Novgorodian conflict	(History of Sweden (800–1521)) Kingdom of Sweden	Novgorod Republic	Inconclusive
1408–1409	Swedish-Novgorodian conflict	(History of Sweden (800–1521)) Kingdom of Sweden	Novgorod Republic	Inconclusive
1411	Tiversk campaign	(History of Sweden (800–1521)) Kingdom of Sweden	Novgorod Republic	Swedish victory
1415	Campaign at the Gulf of Bothnia	(History of Sweden (800–1521)) Kingdom of Sweden	Novgorod Republic	Novgorodian victory
1444	Karl Knutsson's campaign against Novgorod	Kalmar Union (History of Sweden (800–1521)) Sweden (State of the Teutonic Order) Teutonic Order; Livonian Order	Novgorod Republic; Pskov Republic	Swedish victory
1448	Novgorod's war against Karl Knutsson	(History of Sweden (800–1521)) Kingdom of Sweden	Novgorod Republic	Inconclusive

== Wars between Sweden and Tsarist Russia ==
Date	Conflict	Sweden and allies	Russia and allies	Result
1475–1476	Russo–Swedish War (1475–1476)	(History of Sweden (800–1521)) Kingdom of Sweden	Grand Duchy of Moscow	Swedish victory
1479–1482	Russo-Swedish War (1479–1482)	(History of Sweden (800–1521)) Kingdom of Sweden	Grand Duchy of Moscow	Inconclusive
1495–1497	Russo-Swedish War (1495–1497)	Kingdom of Sweden	Grand Duchy of Moscow	Disputed
1499	Border conflict at Nyslott	Kingdom of Sweden	Grand Duchy of Moscow	Swedish victory
1554–1557	Russo-Swedish War (1554–1557)	Kingdom of Sweden	Tsardom of Russia	Inconclusive
1558–1582	Livonian War	Kingdom of Sweden; Livonian Confederation; Polish-Lithuanian Commonwealth; Denmark–Norway; Zaporozhian Cossacks; Principality of Transylvania (after 1577)	Tsardom of Russia Kingdom of Livonia	Swedish allied victory
1590–1595	Russo-Swedish War (1590–1595)	Kingdom of Sweden	Tsardom of Russia	Disputed
1610–1617	Ingrian War	Kingdom of Sweden	Tsardom of Russia	Swedish victory
1656	Samogitian Uprising (1656)	Kingdom of Sweden	Samogitian rebels: Tsardom of Russia	Uprising crushed
1656–1658	Russo-Swedish War (1656–1658)	Kingdom of Sweden	Tsardom of Russia	Swedish victory
1700–1721	Great Northern War	Swedish Empire; Holstein-Gottorp (1700–1714); Warsaw Confederation (1704–1709); Ottoman Empire (1710–1714); Crimean Khanate (1710–1714); Cossack Hetmanate (1708–1714); Dutch Republic (1700); England (1700); Scotland (1700); Ireland (1700); (Kingdom of Great Britain) Great Britain (1719–1720)	Tsardom of Russia; Cossack Hetmanate; Kalmyk Khanate; (Electorate of Saxony) Saxony (1700–1706, 1709–1719); Duchy of Courland (1700–1701); Polish–Lithuanian Commonwealth (1701–1704, 1709–1719); Sandomierz Confederation (1704–1709); Denmark–Norway (1700, 1709–1720); (Kingdom of Prussia) Prussia (1715–1720); (Electorate of Brunswick-Lüneburg) Hanover (1715–1719); (Kingdom of Great Britain) Great Britain (1717–1719); Montenegro (1711–1712); Moldavia	Russian coalition victory
1741–1743	Russo-Swedish War (1741–1743)	Sweden	Russian Empire	Russian victory
1788–1790	Russo-Swedish War (1788–1790)	Sweden	Russian Empire Denmark–Norway	Inconclusive, favourable outcome for Sweden
1808–1809	Finnish War	Sweden	Russian Empire	Russian victory

== See also ==
- Finnish–Novgorodian wars – 11th-14th century European wars in the Baltic region
- Swedish–Novgorodian Wars – A series of conflicts between the 12th and 14th centuries.
- History of the Russo-Turkish wars – Series of conflicts between 1568 and 1918
- List of armed conflicts involving Poland against Russia
- List of wars involving Russia
- List of wars involving Sweden
- Russo-Finnish wars
- Russo-Persian Wars – Series of conflicts between 1651 and 1828
- Swedish intervention in Persia
- Invasion of Åland

== Works cited ==
- Pashuto, Vladimir (1968). Внешняя политика Руси [The foreign policy of Rus'] (in Russian). Moscow: Nauka.
- Liptai, E. (1984), Magyarország hadtörténete [Military history of Hungary] (in Hungarian), vol. 1, Zrínyi Katonai Kiadó, ISBN 963-326-320-4
- Sundberg, Ulf (1998). Medeltidens svenska krig [Medieval Swedish Wars] (in Swedish) (1st ed.). Stockholm: Hjalmarson & Högberg. p. 458. ISBN 9189080262.
- Kotljarchuk, Andrej (2006). In the Shadows of Poland and Russia: The Grand Duchy of Lithuania and Sweden in the European Crisis of the Mid-17th Century. Stockholm University. p. 347. ISBN 978-91-89315-63-1.
- Shkvarov, Alexei (2012). Россия и Швеция. История военных конфликтов 1142-1809 [Russia and Sweden. The history of military conflicts 1142-1809] (in Russian). Saint-Petersburg: RME Group Oy:Алетейя. ISBN 978-5-91419-754-1.
- Carlsson, G. (1925). "Tord Röriksson Bonde". sok.riksarkivet.se. National Archives of Sweden.
- Harrison, Dick (2002). "Härskare i Finland" [Ruler in Finland]. Karl Knutsson: en biografi [Karl Knutsson: a biography] (in Swedish). Historiska Media. ISBN 9789189442580.
- Nordberg, Michael [in Swedish] (1996). I kung Magnus tid: Norden under Magnus Eriksson: 1317-1374 [In the time of King Magnus: The North under Magnus Eriksson: 1317-1374] (in Swedish). Stockholm: Norstedt. ISBN 9119521227.
