= Magnus Eriksson's crusade =

1348-51 War between Sweden and Novgorod

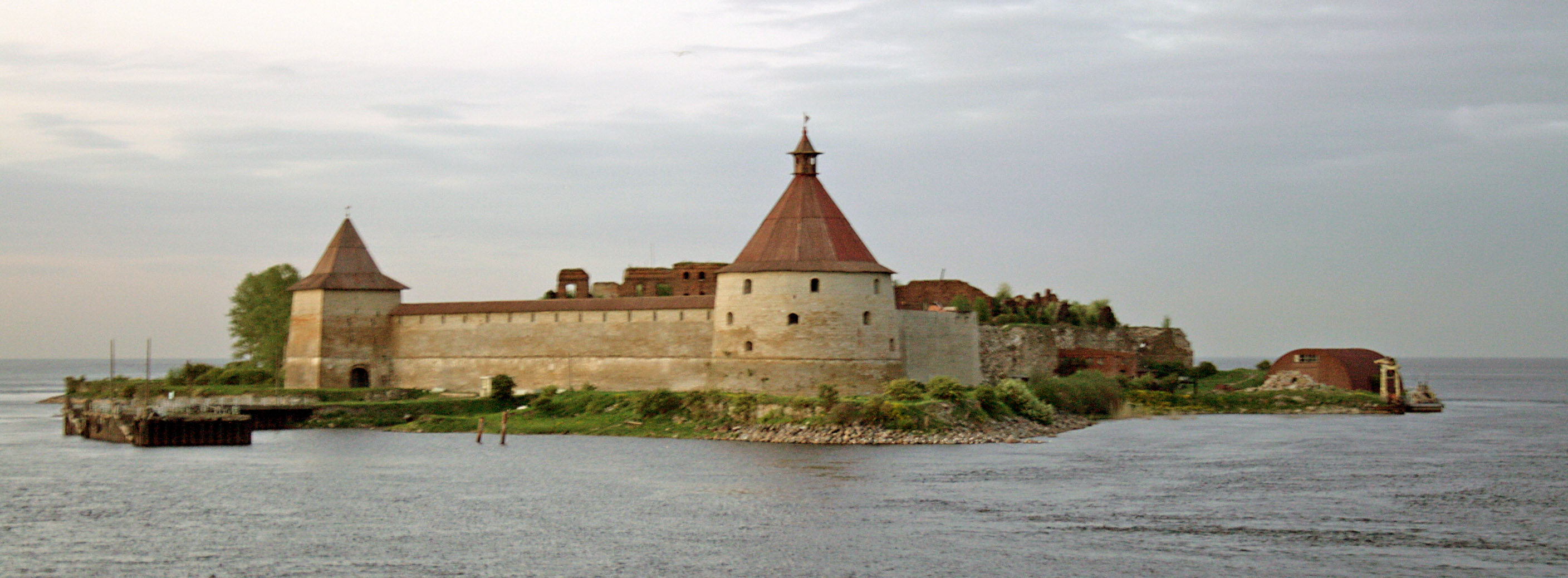
- Modern-day view of Nöteborg (Shlisselburg)
Date	June 1348 – April or May 1351
Location	Ingria, Finland
Result	Novgorodian victory
Territorial changes	Status quo ante bellum

Belligerents
Sweden	Novgorod; Principality of Moscow; Pskov Republic

Commanders and leaders
Magnus Eriksson	Ontsifor Lukinitj; Yakov Khotov; Mikhail Fefilatov; Abraham (POW)

Units involved
Nöteborg garrison Viborg garrison	Nöteborg garrison

Strength
Unknown	At least 1,400 men

Casualties and losses
500 killed	3 killed Several captured

Magnus Eriksson's crusade, also called Magnus Eriksson's war against Novgorod (Swedish: Magnus Erikssons krig mot Novgorod), was a war that occurred from summer 1348 to spring 1351 between Sweden, under King Magnus Eriksson, and Novgorod, and was part of the ongoing series of conflicts during the Swedish–Novgorodian Wars.

In 1348, envoys were sent to Novgorod to challenge them to a theological debate between Catholicism and Orthodoxy. After this was rejected, Magnus invaded Novgorod, where he was defeated in a battle at Schabtschin or Zjabtje according to the Suzdalian Chronicle, suffering 500 killed and some captured. Nevertheless, he continued towards Nöteborg (modern-day Shlisselburg), capturing it on 6 August. After the capture, he left a garrison in the fortress and departed. The fortress was recaptured in February or March of 1349.

Later, in 1350, according to a later source, "King Magnus' Will", Magnus went on another campaign. He won several victories but was unable to attack Nöteborg due to the garrison's size. Instead, he began planning a trade blockade against Novgorod while Novgorodian troops raided Viborg in March 1351. In April or May 1351, a peace treaty or truce was signed, ending with a victory for Novgorod.

== Background ==
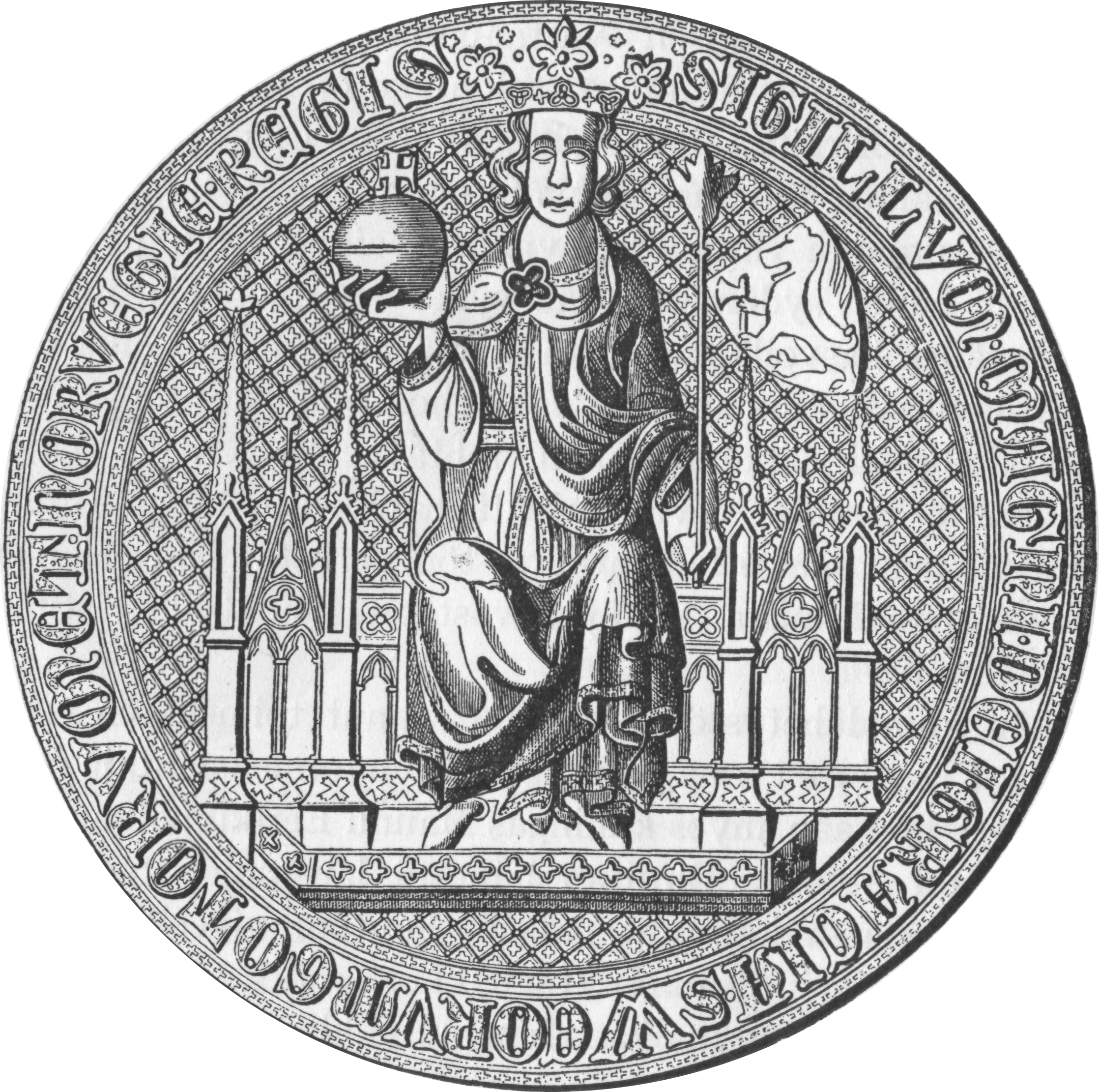
Royal seal of Magnus Eriksson

The Treaty of Nöteborg was signed between Sweden and Novgorod in 1323, in which the two sides agreed to a fixed boundary that divided the Karelian Isthmus. The new border cut through the heartland of the Karelians, with Novgorod inviting Lithuanian service princes to strengthen its hold on Karelia. These service princes relied on contributions from the local population, which did not make Novgorodian rule any more popular. Despite this, Novgorod did not make serious attempts at Christianizing the Karelian population. However, in 1337, a Karelian uprising in Korelsky Gorodok led to the killing of Russian merchants and all Christians in general, and marked the beginning of another war between Sweden and Novgorod, as the Karelians called for Swedish intervention. Two years later, the two sides agreed to renew the treaty.

In 1346, according to Icelandic annals, Novgorodian troops attacked Swedish territory, which would serve as a justification for the crusade. Additionally, it may have been intended as a follow-up to the Third Swedish Crusade, and was possibly inspired by Bridget of Sweden.

In 1348, Magnus Eriksson sent envoys to challenge the Novgorodians to a theological debate with his philosophers over whether Catholicism or Orthodoxy was the true faith, saying that the loser would adopt the winner's religion. This was rejected, even with the threat of war, as the Novgorodians told Magnus' envoys to take the issue to Constantinople, angering Magnus. After, they met with Magnus near Orekhov to negotiate. However, Magnus refused, telling the Novgorodian envoys: "I have no grievance whatever against you", implying that their refusal had not upset him. Nevertheless, he later demanded, "Adopt my faith, or I will march against you with my whole force". The Novgorodians promptly withdrew as Magnus began leading his forces up the Neva to besiege Nöteborg. According to förbindelsedikten his army also consisted of Danish and German support troops.

== Crusade ==
=== 1348–1349 ===
As the first military action of the crusade, Magnus' forces carried out forceful baptisms onto the Ingrian population, exposing those who refused to violence. According to Russian sources, they were only carried out on Pagans. Once these baptisms were reported, Novgorod mobilized with military support from Pskov. A smaller force (druzhina) of 400 men led by Ontsifor Lukinitj, Yakov Khotov, and Mikhail Fefilatov was sent to intercept the Swedes. Both sides met in battle at Schabtschin or Zjabtje in Vod according to the Suzdalian Chronicle, and according to the Novgorod Chronicle, the Swedes and Novgorodians lost 500 and 3 men respectively. Several Swedes were also captured, though the number is not specified.

Despite the defeat (which is not named in Swedish sources), the Swedes continued their march towards Nöteborg (modern-day Shlisselburg), where they began besieging it on 24 June. During the siege, the Novgorodians made a successful sortie, but the Swedes were too strong and eventually captured it on 6 August. The capture of the fortress has also been blamed on deception. In the aftermath, the Swedes took around 500 Novgorodians captive, releasing most of them after shaving their beards and baptizing them, except for a few more prominent people including the fortress’s commander, Abraham. Kuzma Tverdislavitj was also captured, who was a noble. The capture of the fortress meant total Swedish control of the Neva River.

After capturing Nöteborg, Magnus departed back to Sweden, leaving a small garrison in the city. Other sources estimate the garrison was larger, in total 800 men. Due to the importance of Nöteborg, a Novgorodian army of 1,000 men approached the city soon after and besieged it on their own. This is because neither Prince Ivan nor troops from Pskov wanted to help. Additionally, after the capture of Nöteborg, the Swedes tried and failed to capture Kexholm (present-day Priozersk).

After a prolonged siege, assisted by Muscovite troops, Nöteborg was recaptured with minimal losses for the Novgorodians on 24 February or 9 March of 1349 after having been set on fire and stormed. The Swedish garrison had suffered from starvation and lack of reinforcements. In the aftermath, many Swedes were killed and captured. Novgorodian raiding parties also went north. Further details on what happened in 1349 are sparse. However, in a letter from 2 July 1349, Magnus allowed Lübeck and other cities to continue trading with Livonia and Gotland, on the condition that they avoid trading with Novgorodians, Russians, and people from Pskov.

=== 1350–1351 ===
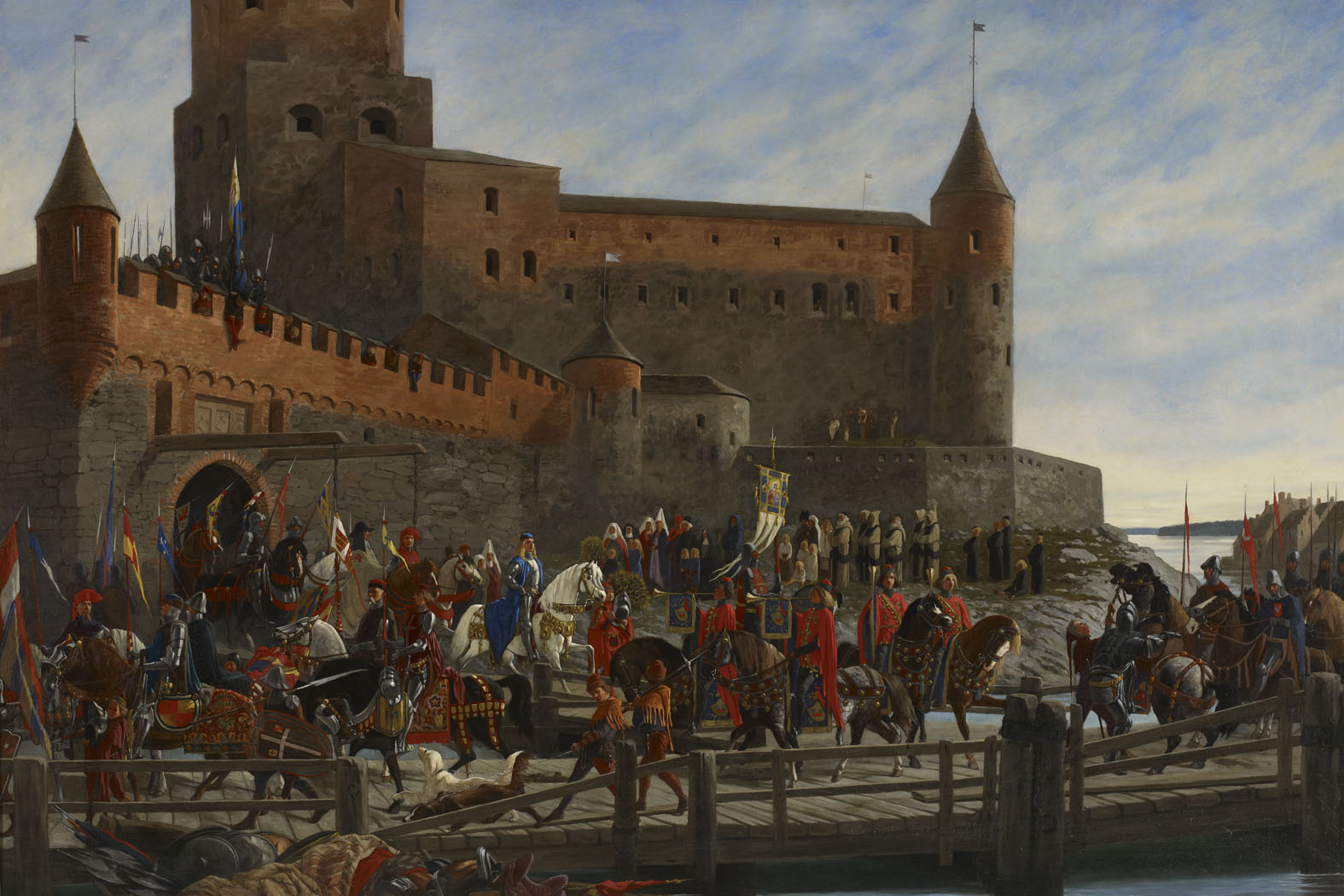
Depiction of Viborg as it was in 1448 during Karl Knutsson's departure from it.

During 1350, mobilizations began in Sweden, which had also been impacted by the Black Death. Magnus most likely hired foreign mercenaries to go on a new campaign. Due to low funds, Magnus was forced to raise taxes to pay for the mercenaries. Magnus also received full support from the Pope, even if the taxes were unpopular among the people. During the beginning of the campaign, Magnus won large victories, but was unable to attack Nöteborg since the garrison was too large. Later, after withdrawing to Ladoga, the Swedish army was surrounded by a larger Novgorodian force in Lovkaån. However, the Swedes managed to escape, even though the fleet was scattered by a storm. The source describing the events of this campaign, "King Magnus' will", was written much later, making it potentially unreliable. However, Dick Harrison says it is not unlikely that the campaign did occur.

In early 1351, Magnus worked to establish a blockade of trade to Novgorod. In the spring, Novgorodian forces under the command of Simeon of Moscow raided Finland. They later made it to Viborg (present-day Vyborg) on 21 March, razing the outskirts. However, they were unable to breach the walls, and soon retreated. They also exchanged prisoners with the Swedes at Dorpat (present-day Tartu). In the spring or summer of the same year, Pope Clement VI in a bull dated 14 March agreed to let Magnus borrow half of the funds needed for a new crusade against Novgorod. Additionally, he told the archbishops and bishops in the north to preach the crusade and for the Teutonic Order to support it.

The pope described the conversion of the Izhorians and Karelians as the goal of the crusade, but the financial support given to Magnus was intended to allow him to fight Russians, "enemies of the Catholic faith", because they threatened missionary work. Bridget of Sweden also distinguished between the groups by applying the term "pagans" (paganos) to the Izhorians and Karelians, while using the term "infidels" (infideles) for the Russians.

== Aftermath ==
Exactly when a peace treaty was signed is unknown. However, around May 1351, Magnus returned to Sweden. It is likely that he would not have left the Baltic unless the war was over. Thus, according to Michael Nordberg, a likely time when peace or a truce was signed is around April or May 1351. The treaty was based off the previous Treaty of Nöteborg in 1323. However, no treaty has been preserved. Because of the lack of a preserved treaty, Nordberg concludes that neither side won. Nevertheless, other historians disagree, claiming a Novgorodian victory. Historian John Howard Lind has labeled the crusade a disaster and a failure for the Swedes, with a similar remark from Danish medieval historian Carsten Selch Jensen, stating it was a heavy defeat for the Swedes.

== See also ==
- Third Swedish Crusade – 13th-century military campaign
- Neva campaign – War between Sweden and Novgorod
- Karl Knutsson's campaign against Novgorod – War between Sweden and Novgorod
