= Tiversk campaign =

War between Sweden and Novgorod

- Part of the Swedish–Novgorodian Wars
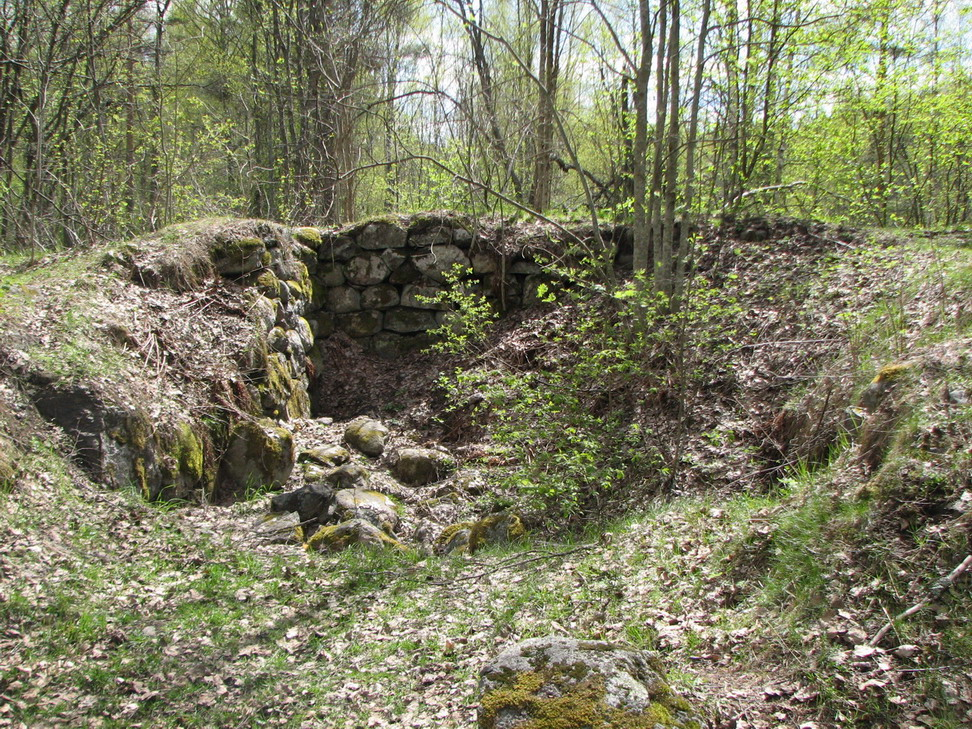
- Ruins of Tiversk
Date	1411
Location	Tiversk, Viborg
Result	Swedish victory
Territorial changes	Tiversk is destroyed

Belligerents
(History of Sweden (800–1521)) Sweden	Novgorod

Commanders and leaders
(History of Sweden (800–1521)) Tord Röriksson Bonde	Simeon Olgerdovich; Paul †

Units involved
(History of Sweden (800–1521)) Viborg garrison	Tiversk garrison

Strength
Unknown	At least 30

Casualties and losses
Many killed and captured	At least 1 killed

The Tiversk campaign (Swedish: Tiverskkampanjen) refers to a war between Sweden and Novgorod in 1411, it was originally a Swedish attempt to destroy Tiversk but it would later develop into a larger conflict.

== Background ==
Since 1399, the eastern border of Sweden had remained relatively peaceful, there were possible border skirmishes that took place, but no larger confrontations had developed. The Swedish passive policy on the border with Novgorod can be explained by the many wars it had to fight on other fronts, and on the Novgorodian side how they had to concentrate on the Teutonic Order.

== Campaign ==
In 1411, the Swedes attacked the Novgorodian fortress of Tiversk, this was likely identical to the modern day Tiurula and it acted as a border fortress for Novgorod. The Swedes captured and destroyed the fortress. The Swedes were likely being led by the commander of Viborg, Tord Röriksson Bonde.

The Novgorodians quickly responded to the Swedish attack, and only three days later after hearing of their attack, an army begins marching to raid Swedish areas. Under the leadership of Simeon Olgerdovich, the Novgorodians attacked and "burned villages, cut down many Swedes and captured others". 30 participating Voivode are mentioned by name in the Novgorod Chronicle.

On 26 March, the Novgorodians arrived outside of Viborg. However, the walls of the fortress were too strong for them and they satisfied themselves by razing the town and raiding the local lands around Viborg. This attack would be the fourth time that Viborg was threatened in its history by an enemy force. According to the Novgorod Chronicle, the Novgorodian revenge expedition only cost them one life, that being Paul of Nutna Street. The Novgorodians would later retreat away from Viborg with many prisoners of war, after the siege's failure.

== Aftermath ==
The city of Uleå would later be subject to raids from Novgorod in 1415, and in 1431 the Novgorod chronicle names an expedition against the kajans in Northern Finland, but the Swedish–Novgorodian border would remain in a state of relative calm until 1444.
