= Finnish–Novgorodian wars =

11th-14th century European wars in the Baltic region

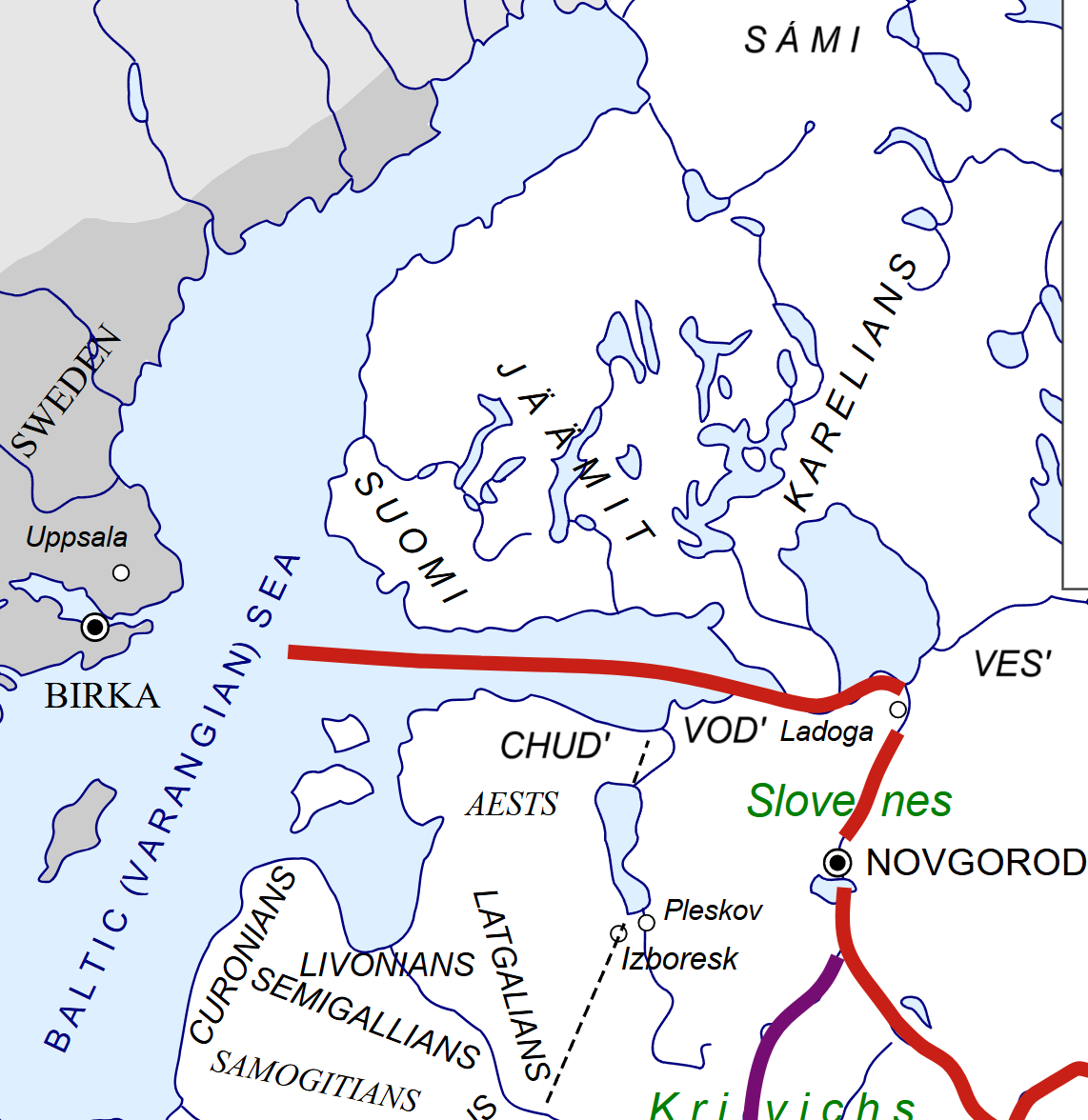
Map of the Baltic region in the 10th century. Jäämit, Yem' and Yam' are all thought to refer primarily to the Tavastians of south-central Finland, but the meaning could be broader.

The Finnish–Novgorodian wars or battles between Novgorod and the Yem' (Russian: Войны Новгорода с емью, romanized: Vojny Novgoroda s yem'yu) were a series of conflicts between Finnic tribes in eastern Fennoscandia and the Republic of Novgorod from the 11th or 12th century to the early 14th century.

The terms used in Russian chronicles to refer to Novgorod's enemy, the Yem' (Емь, also transcribed as Em') or Yam' (Ямь), are unclear and may have referred to several different groups, although the chronicles usually situate them at the northern coast of Lake Ladoga. Etymologically, Yem' is thought derive from the Finnish word Häme, which means Tavastia. Some of the groups identified as Yem' may have been the inhabitants of Tavastland in south-central Finland, the West Finns in general, (Note: About the association of the term Yem' with Finns, see Suomen varhaiskeskiajan lähteitä. Historian aitta XXI. Gummerus kirjapaino Oy. Jyväskylä 1989. ISBN 951-96006-1-2.) or a sub-group of Karelians on the northern coast of the Ladoga who descended from western Finns who had moved to the area earlier.

== Sources ==
The only known written sources on the Yem'–Novgorodian wars are contained in Russian chronicles, especially the Novgorod First Chronicle (NPL). The Synod Scroll, the earliest surviving copy of the Novgorod First Chronicle, mentions twelve armed clashes involving the Yem' between 1042–1311. (Note: Under the years 1042, 1123, 1142, 1143, 1149, 1186, 1191, 1227, 1228, 1240, 1256, and 1311.) However, the Synod Scroll has a gap on years 1273–1298, and only scattered entries between 1330–1352. A later version of the First Chronicle contains two additional entries about the Yem' on years 1292 and 1342. The entry from 1342 has been a subject of much debate, as it uses an anomalous term Yemtsan and places the Yem' somewhere in White Karelia.

The Primary Chronicle (PVL), written in Kiev, mentions the Yem' or Yam' three times, with only one being a chronicle entry. The Suzdalian Chronicle, written Novgorod-Suzdal, mentions those 13th-century attacks against the Yem' which involved Suzdalian princes.

== 11th century ==
The earliest possible mention of hostilities is from the Primary Chronicle, which records in passing that the Novgorodian Prince Vladimir Yaroslavich was at war with the Yam' (Ямь) in the year 1042. A shorter version of this passage appears in the NPL. Cross & Sherbowitz-Wetzor (1953) remarked: "The Yam' were a Finnish tribe occupying at this period the region between Lake Ladoga and the Northern Dvina, into which they seemed to have been forced by the pressure of Slavic colonization." The Yam' are also mentioned in the Primary Chronicle in a list of peoples that at some unspecified point paid tribute to Rus', but they disappear from sources later on. (Note: At the time of the conflict, Sweden still controlled access to the Baltic Sea. The Primary Chronicle does not mention the Karelians or Izhorians who lived between Russians and Finns. Furthermore, the said Vladimir attacked Constantinople in 1043, making it unlikely that he was fighting on the other side of the continent only a year earlier.)

== 12th century ==
The Novgorod First Chronicle mentions Prince Vsevolod Mstislavich leading a Novgorodian campaign against the Yem people during the Great Fast in the spring of 1123. (Note: Their motives are unclear. While the Great Fast would have been a deliberate self-imposed abstention from eating food, a curious mention "but the march was terrible; [a loaf of] bread cost one nogata" (twenty nogatÿ equalled one grivna) might indicate the Novgorodians experienced a famine in 1123, and raided the Yem to steal their food. The chronicle leaves any further developments of the conflict open, including the whereabouts of the fight.)

The NPL reports that Yem pillaged Novgorodian territory in 1142, but were defeated near Ladoga with 400 casualties; (Note: Alternately, '400' refers to the number of men of Ladoga who defeated the Yem incursion.) Remarkably, the Chronicle claims that the Ladogans "let no one escape"; every single Yem' attacker was supposedly killed. Finnish historian Mari Isoaho (2006) assessed that this narrative employs hyperbole, comparing this entry with the 1149 Yem' raid account, as well as another story of the same year (1142): three merchant ships heading for Novgorod are attacked by 60 Swedish ships led by a prince and a bishop, but nevertheless the merchants emerged victorious while killing 150 Swedes and capturing three ships (in addition to the three they had). Isoaho added:

This account uses exactly the same kind of hyperbole as the Neva account of 1240. Here too, the Swedes are presented as a superior power with a large number of ships, while their bishop participates in the expedition side by side with the prince. Thus the accounts contained in the Novgorod I Chronicle can hardly be regarded as reliable and neutral in describing the confrontations between the armies of Sweden and Novgorod in Karelia and around Lake Ladoga. In 1149 the Novgorodians and the Votyans encountered intruding forces from Em and killed them all.

In the following year (1143), the Korel people (Note: It is unclear whether the Korel people were supposed to be under Novgorodian influence at the time of this first mention in the NPL under the year 1143. On later occasions, the Korel people were always allies or co-belligerents of the Novgorodians, first against the Yem people (under the years 1191 and 1228), later against the Nemtsy (probably troops of the Livonian Order, the Duchy of Estonia, and/or the Bishopric of Ösel–Wiek, under the years 1241 and 1253).) were at war with Yem', but were forced to flee, losing two ships.

The NPL reports a raid occurring in the winter of 1149, with 'several thousand' Yem troops attacking the Votians or Vod' people, mentioned in the chronicle for the first time. It goes on to narrate that the Novgorodians heard of the Yem raid on the Vod people, and they decided to dispatch about 500 troops "with the Vod people against them, and did not let a man escape." (Note: The Votians were a Finnic tribe living between the Narva and Neva rivers; their descendants are almost extinct in the early 21st century. Whether the Votians were in alliance with (or paying tribute to) the Novgorodians prior to this Yem raid, is unknown.) Isoaho (2006) noted the strong similarities with the entry for the year 1142 (and the Swedish entries of 1142 and 1240), concluding that this is not a reliable historical account of what supposedly happened in the year 1149, but a hyperbolic story.

A Novgorodian called "Vyshata Vasilyevich" reportedly led his troops in a raid against the Yem' people in 1186, returning in good health with booty.

The First Novgorodian Chronicle narrates that in 1191, Korel' people (Karelians) accompanied Novgorodians in an attack against the Yem'. This time the fighting is said to have taken place "in their land" (землю ихъ, meaning the land of the Yem'), the first such entry in Russian chronicles. The assailants "burned the country and killed the cattle".

The mid-16th-century Chronicon episcoporum Finlandensium by Bishop Paulus Juusten also mentions the Novgorodians burning Turku (Åbo) in 1198, at the time of Bishop Folquinus, but it has been shown that this information is based on incorrect reading of the year 1318, (Note: In Roman numerals, 1198 is written as MCXCVIII, while 1318 is MCCCXVIII.) which is the year of a well-known Attack on Turku by Novgorodians.

After 1191, the NPL contains no information on further Yem'–Novgorodian conflicts for several decades until 1227 (6735).

== Swedish and Papal involvement ==
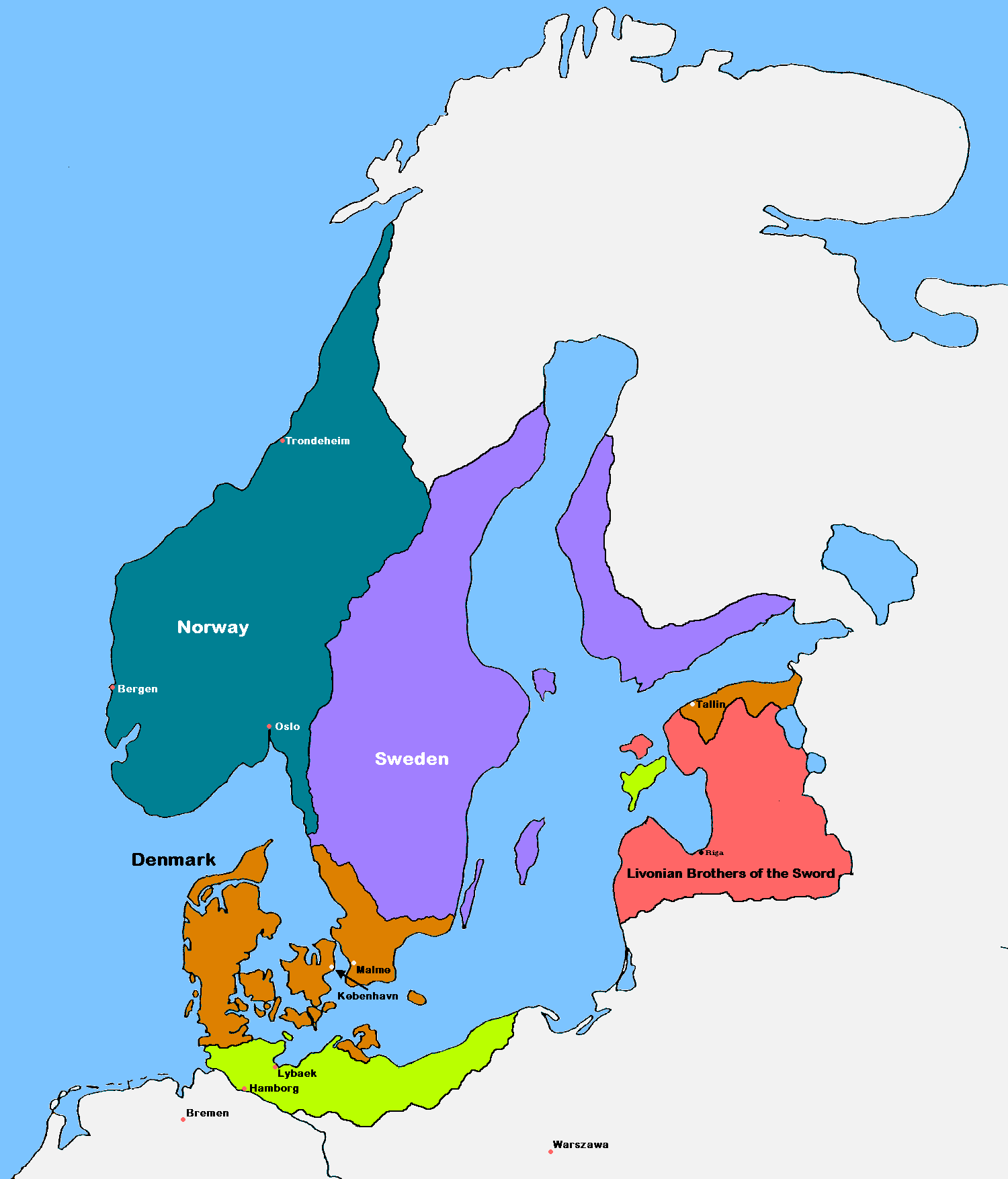
Sources suggest that by 1220, Sweden had established a foothold in Southwest Finland, while Novgorod had extended its influence over parts of Karelia. But many details, such as the status of the Yem', remain unclear.

At the same time, Sweden and Novgorod were in conflict as well. Pope Alexander III, in his letter to the Archbishop of Uppsala and Jarl Gottorm of Sweden in 1171 (or 1172), perhaps refers to the Finns' struggle against Novgorod by demanding Sweden take over Finnish fortresses in exchange for protection. In the late 15th century, historian Ericus Olai claimed that Bishop Kol of Linköping (died c. 1196) had been the "Jarl of Finland" (Dux Finlandiae), (Note: The Latin word "Dux" came to mean "Duke" only in the late 13th century and was used in the meaning of Jarl earlier.) possibly leading Swedish troops temporarily situated in Finland. He may have been in a military role similar to that of Jon Jarl, who allegedly spent nine years overseas fighting against Novgorodians and Ingrians at the end of the 12th century. (Note: Ericus Olai may also have made a mistake, since Jon Jarl is apparently buried in the Cathedral of Linköping, thus making him the Jarl of Finland instead of Bishop Kol.)

According to several 15th-century sources, the so-called First Swedish Crusade took place in 1150. (Note: Several historians from the early 20th century onwards have tried to date the crusade to 1155, with some contestable lines of argument. See Heikkilä, Tuomas. Pyhän Henrikin legenda. Karisto Oy Hämeenlinna 2005. ISBN 951-746-738-9.) The crusade is only known from later legends that presented the expedition (if it ever took place) as a Christian mission, headed by a saintly king to baptize heathens. However, it seems to have followed the exceptionally edgy 1140s with both the Yem and Swedes fighting against Novgorod. Some historians have seen it as a direct reaction to the failed Yem expedition in 1149, associating it with the co-operation mentioned by the Pope 20 years later.

In 1221, Pope Honorius III was again worried about the situation after receiving alarming information from the Archbishop of Uppsala. He authorized the unnamed Bishop of Finland to establish a trade embargo against the "barbarians" that threatened the Christianity in Finland. The nationality of the "barbarians", presumably a citation from Archbishop's earlier letter, remains unknown, and was not necessarily known even by the Pope. However, as the trade embargo was widened eight years later, it was specifically said to be against the Russians.

== 13th century ==
Another conflict between Yem and Novgorod took place in the 1220s. After having secured his power in Novgorod by 1222, Grand Prince Yaroslav II of Vladimir organized a series of attacks against Estonia, Yem and Karelia.

=== 1220s campaign accounts ===
The Novgorod First Chronicle (NPL) briefly reports a conflict in the year 1227 (6735):

Knyaz Yaroslav went with the men of Novgorod against the Yem people; and ravaged the whole land and brought back countless plunder.

By contrast, the Laurentian Codex (Lav.) mentions Yaroslav holding a campaign against the Yam' in the winter of the year 1226 (6734), with many more details:

The same winter Yaroslav, son of Vsevolod left Novgorod over the sea against Yem where no else Russian prince had been able to dwell; and he conquered the land and returned to Novgorod praising God with many prisoners. When those who were accompanying him could not handle all the prisoners, they killed some of them but released many more.

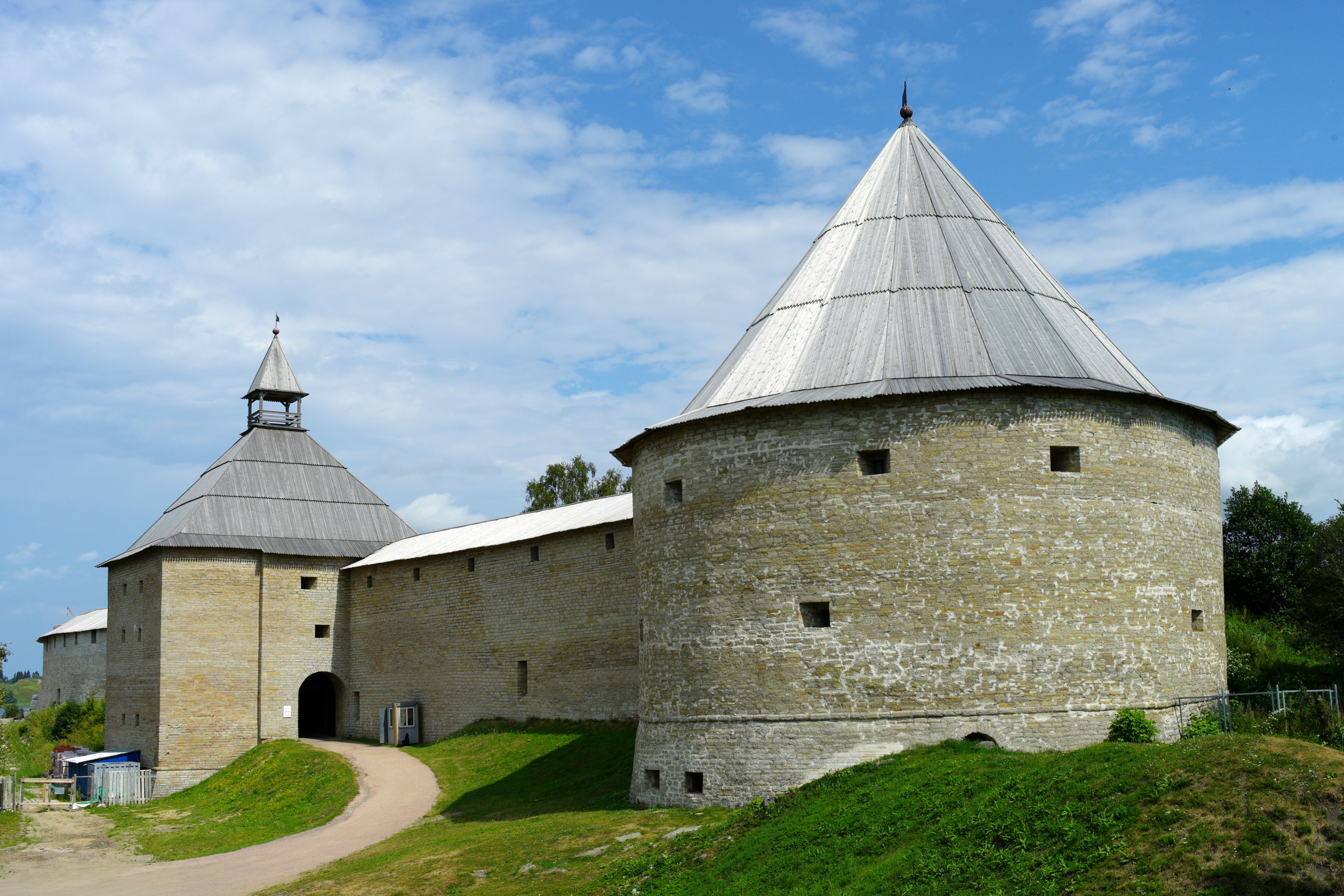
The bailiff of Ladoga castle (here in its 15th-century appearance) repelled the Yem forces in 1228.

The Yem retaliatory expedition in summer 1228 (6736) against Ladoga, allegedly with more than 2000 men (Note: The figure sounds high. The usual Swedish ledung had just 2500 men which would mean that less organized Yem were able to establish a similar naval force. Total population in Finland at the time is estimated to have been 50 000 at the maximum. See Suomen museo 2002 (ISBN 951-9057-47-1), page 85.) ended in disaster, as described by the Novgorod First Chronicle.

The Yem came to Lake Ladoga to war, and word about that came to Novgorod on the Ascension Day of the Christ (6.8). And Novgorodians took their barges and rowed to Ladoga with prince Yaroslav. Vladislav, the bailiff at Ladoga, and the people of Ladoga did not wait for the Novgorodians, but went after them (Finns) in boats where they were fighting, met with them and fought them; and then came night, and they (people of Ladoga) landed on an island, but Finns were on the coast with prisoners; for they had been fighting close to the lake near the landing place, and in Olonets. The same night they asked for peace, but the bailiff and the people of Ladoga did not grant it; and they killed all the prisoners and ran into forests, after abandoning their ships. Many of them fell there, but their boats were burned. -- And of those who had come, 2000 or more were killed, God knows; and the rest (who had not fled) were all killed.

=== Assessment ===
The war seems to have been the end of independent Yem-Novgorodian conflicts. Based on Papal letters from 1229, the unknown Bishop of Finland took advantage of the chaotic situation by taking over non-Christian places of worship and moving the see to a "more suitable" location. On the bishop's request, the Pope also enforced a trade embargo against Novgorodians on the Baltic Sea, at least in Visby, Riga and Lübeck. A few years later, the Pope also requested the Livonian Brothers of the Sword send troops to protect Finland. Whether any knights ever arrived remains unknown.

Seppo Zetterberg (1987) argued that the conflicts between the Yem' and Novgorodians were a factor contributing to the Second Swedish Crusade around 1249, in which Sweden allegedly conquered Tavastia, the homeland of the Yem'. Under Swedish rule, the wars continued to rage in Finland as a part of Swedish-Novgorodian Wars.

According to Janet L. B. Martin (2007), Novgorod managed to "[extend] its authority over Karelian and Em' tribes in southern Finland (...) in the first decades of the thirteenth century, (...) and thus improved its own position along the northern coast of the Gulf of Finland."

On the other hand, Anti Selart (2015) reasoned that the 1228 Novgorodian campaign against the Yem' (Tavastians) "was a failure because a quarrel took place within the Novgorod army caused by disaffection with the prince."

== Aftermath ==
In subsequent years, the Tavastians (Yem') still appeared to act as an independent, pagan people. A papal letter of 1237 by Pope Gregory IX alleges that there was a Tavastian uprising against Sweden (rather than against Novgorod) in the winter of 1236–1237, in which the Tavastians supposedly committed apostasy against Christianity and reverted to their pagan beliefs. Traditionally, historians understood the Pope's accusation that certain "enemies of the cross", which had supposedly instigated the Tavastians to rebel, included Novgorod, although Selart pointed out the papal letter says no such thing. It is also unclear when the so-called Second Swedish Crusade by Birger Jarl took place: before or after this papal letter was written, nor what its connection (if any) was to the 1240 Battle of the Neva.

In 1240, the Swedes launched a campaign to the Neva River, where they were defeated in the Battle of the Neva by the Russians, led by Prince Alexander Nevsky. This expedition and battle are only documented in Russian sources. According to the hagiographic text Life of Alexander Nevsky and various chronicles, the Swedes were accompanied by the Murmane (Norwegians), the Yem, and the Sum (Suomi, Finns from Southwestern Finland). However, the entries in the Pskov Chronicle and related chronicles do not mention the Murmane, Sum, or Yem, only referring to the Swedes. John H. Lind finds it unlikely that the Norwegians joined the expedition, as King Haakon Haakonsson of Norway was occupied suppressing an uprising of Skule Bårdsson at the time. This also casts doubt on the participation of the Sum and Yem. Lind suggests that the list of enemies may have been exaggerated by duplicating names from later entries, due to the great symbolic significance ascribed to the Battle of Neva.

The first reliable mention of Yem and Sum being part of Swedish forces dates back to 1256, when the Swedes began constructing a fortress in Narva with the Yem, Sum, and Didman (identified in literature as Dietrich von Kyvel, a Danish vassal). The Swedes also launched the so-called Second Swedish Crusade to around this time, establishing their rule in Tavastia (Häme). While the crusade has traditionally been dated to 1249–1250, many scholars now believe it predated the Neva expedition, occurring as early as 1238–1239.

The Yem are no longer mentioned in Novgorodian sources after the early 14th century. After this time, various Germanic peoples—such as the Swedes, Norwegians, and Gutes (or Geats)—are collectively referred to by the single ethnonym Nemtsy. The same term is also applied to Finnic peoples, including the Yem, who have been incorporated into the Swedish realm. Similarly, after the Treaty of Nöteborg in 1323, Swedish sources cease to distinguish between Russians and Karelians.

== See also ==
- Early Finnish wars
- List of wars involving Finland

== Bibliography ==
=== Primary sources ===
- Primary Chronicle (PVL; c. 1110s).
  - Cross, Samuel Hazzard; Sherbowitz-Wetzor, Olgerd P. (1953). The Russian Primary Chronicle, Laurentian Text. Translated and edited by Samuel Hazzard Cross and Olgerd P. Sherbowitz-Wetzor (PDF). Cambridge, Massachusetts: The Mediaeval Academy of America. p. 325. (First edition published in 1930. The first 50 pages are a scholarly introduction.)
  - Thuis, Hans (2015). Nestorkroniek. De oudste geschiedenis van het Kievse Rijk (in Dutch). Nijmegen: Uitgeverij Vantilt. p. 304. ISBN 9789460042287.
  - Ostrowski, Donald; Birnbaum, David J. (7 December 2014). "Rus' primary chronicle critical edition – Interlinear line-level collation". pvl.obdurodon.org (in Church Slavic). Archived from the original on 28 April 2025.
- Synod Scroll (Older Redaction) of the Novgorod First Chronicle (NPL; 13th–15th century).
  - Izbornyk (2001). "Новгородская Первая Летопись" [Novgorod First Chronicle]. Izbornyk (in Church Slavic). Nauka. – digitised 1950 Nauka edition of the Novgorod First Chronicle (NPL), including both the Synodal (Synodalnyy) or "Older Edition" (Starshego Izvoda, St.) and the mid-15th-century Archaeographic Commission's edition (Komissionnyy) or "Younger Edition" (Mladshego Izvoda, Ml.)
  - Michell, Robert; Forbes, Nevill (1914). The Chronicle of Novgorod 1016–1471. Translated from the Russian by Robert Michell and Nevill Forbes, Ph.D. Reader in Russian in the University of Oxford, with an introduction by C. Raymond Beazley and A. A. Shakhmatov (PDF). London: Gray's Inn. p. 237.

=== Scholarly literature ===
- Isoaho, Mari (2006). The Image of Aleksandr Nevskiy in Medieval Russia: Warrior and Saint. Leiden: Brill. p. 428. ISBN 9789047409496.
- Isoaho, Mari (2017-10-01). "Yksityiskohdista kokonaisuuteen : Häme Novgorodin kronikoissa" [From details to the big picture : Häme in Novgorod chronicles]. Historiallinen Aikakauskirja (in Finnish). 115 (3): 346–356. doi:10.54331/haik.140437. ISSN 0018-2362.
- Mägi, Marika (15 May 2018). In Austrvegr: The Role of the Eastern Baltic in Viking Age Communication across the Baltic Sea. BRILL. ISBN 978-90-04-36381-6.
- Martin, Janet (2007). Medieval Russia: 980–1584. Second Edition. E-book. Cambridge: Cambridge University Press. ISBN 978-0-511-36800-4.
- Murray, Alan (2009). The Clash of Cultures on the Medieval Baltic Frontier. Ashgate Publishing. ISBN 978-0754664833.
- Line, Philip (2007). Kingship and State Formation in Sweden. BRILL. ISBN 978-9004155787.
- Péderi, Tamás (2017). "The Role of Economy in the Early Wars of Novgorod". Specimina Nova Pars Prima Sectio Medaevalis. 9. University Library of Pécs: 123–134. doi:10.15170/spmnnv.2017.09.06. ISSN 1588-8002.
- Selart, Anti (2015). "Chapter 3: Livonia and Rus' in the 1230s and 1240s". Livonia, Rus' and the Baltic Crusades in the Thirteenth Century. Leiden/Boston: BRILL. pp. 127–170. doi:10.1163/9789004284753_005. ISBN 978-90-04-28475-3.
