= Tiversk =

Coordinates: 60°50′10″N 29°49′00″E

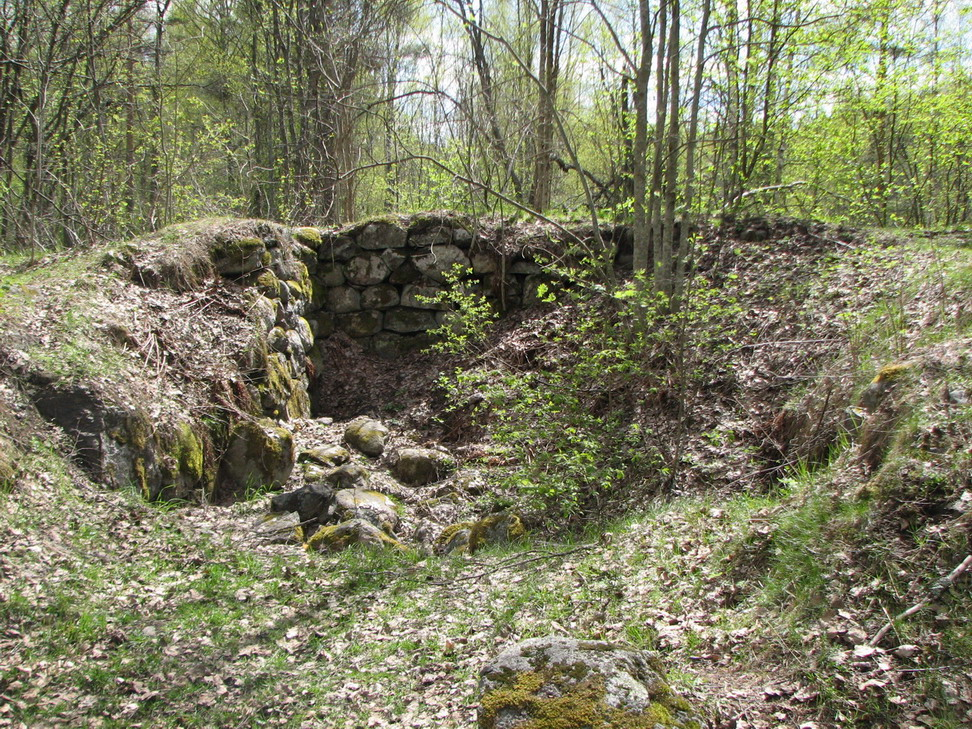
The ruins of Tiversk.

Tiversk or Tiurinlinna (Finnish: Tiurinlinna, Russian: Тиверск or Тиверский городок) is a site of ancient Karelian settlement and a ruined fortification near Melnikovo (Räisälä in Finnish) in the Karelian Isthmus. The fortification has been in use in different stages in history and it has also been described as a village. The site used to be an island of the River Vuoksi, which became a peninsula after 1857, near rapids. The island is approximately 240 metres (790 feet) long and 80 metres (260 feet) wide.

The oldest findings indicating settlement on the site are dated between 500BC–300AD. Several researchers have come to the conclusion that the site served as a fortification in the 11th century and possibly even earlier. Anatoly Kirpichnikov asserts that the fortification was founded in the late 1330s. Archaeologists have found stone foundations of 19 buildings which varied in size between 4 by 5 metres (13 by 16 feet) and 8 by 7 metres (26 by 23 feet). There has also been one much larger building with a floor area of 300 square metres (3,200 square feet) and a hearth in the middle of the building.

The Treaty of Nöteborg established a Novgorodian-Swedish border in the immediate vicinity and left the fort on the Novgorodian side. Kirpichnikov believes that Karelian Vallittu who ruled the Korela Fortress started building Tiversk after the treaty. The fort is mentioned for the first time in the Nikon Chronicle in 1404 when the settlement was granted to Prince Yury of Smolensk as an appanage. Seven years later, the fort was sacked and destroyed by the Swedes during one of the Swedish-Novgorodian Wars.

The site of Tiversk was first identified and described by Jacob Groot in 1847. The remnants were excavated in 1888–1891 by Hjalmar Appelgren, Theodor Schwindt and Alfred Hackman, in 1971 by Anatoly Kirpichnikov, and in 1971–1974 by Svetlana Kochkurkina. Most remnants are dated the end of the 13th to the beginning of the 15th centuries. In 1890, archaeological works revealed a treasure trove of 13th–15th century Arabic silver coins. Some remnants dated 10th–early 12th century have also been discovered. The ramparts and stone walls of the settlement were 4.5 to 7 metres (15 to 23 feet) thick.
