= Sten Bielke's war against Novgorod =

War between Sweden and Novgorod

Sten Bielkes war against Novgorod
- Part of the Swedish–Novgorodian Wars
Date	1338–1339
Location	Karelia, Ingria
Result	Swedish victory
Territorial changes	Status quo ante bellum

Belligerents
(History of Sweden (800–1521)) Sweden; Rebels from Korela	Novgorod

Commanders and leaders
(History of Sweden (800–1521)) Sten Turesson Bielke (History of Sweden (800–1521)) Peter Jonsson	Narimantas; Feodor; Michail Koporanin †

Units involved
(History of Sweden (800–1521)) Forces from Viborg	Forces from Kopore

Strength
Unknown	Likely large

Casualties and losses
Many captured and killed	Light

Sten Bielke's war against Novgorod (Swedish: Sten Bielkes krig mot Novgorod) was a war between Sweden and Novgorod lasting from 1338 to 1339. It started when the Novgorodians attempted to take revenge on Karelian rebels that had fled to Viborg in 1337.

== Background ==
The Lithuanian prince Narimantas had received Russian Karelia, parts of Ingria, and the city of Ladoga in 1333. His regime was supposedly very unpopular, and in 1337 some non-Christian Karelians caused a violent uprising in Korela supported by the commander of Viborg and killed many Russians, after which they escaped and took refuge in Viborg.

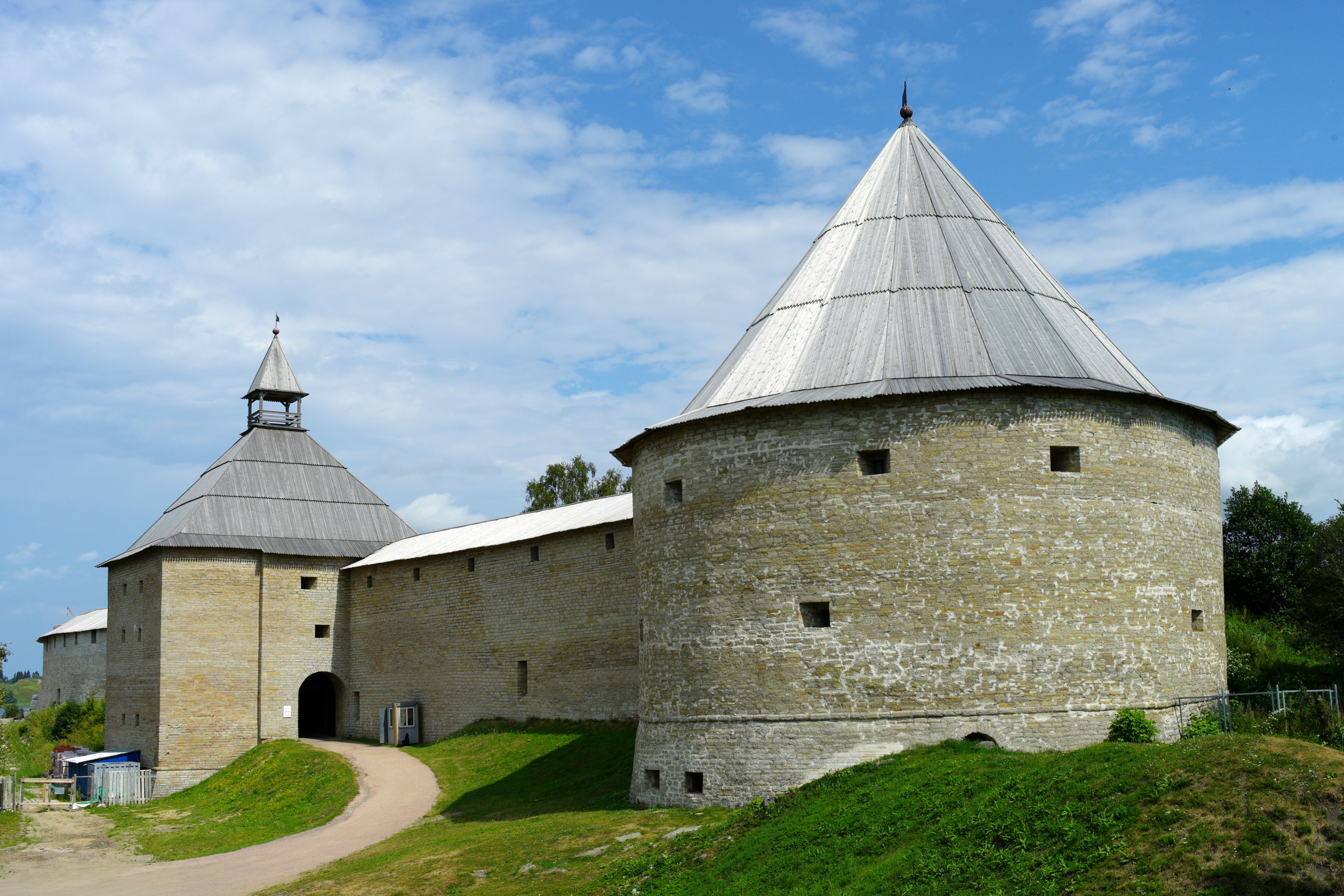
Ladoga Fortress, more commonly referred to as Staraya Ladoga.

== War ==
In the spring of 1338, the Novgorodians would march out under the command of the Posadnik Fedor Vasilevich to take revenge on the rebels situated in Viborg. They went along the Neva. However, they would be intercepted at Nöteborg and negotiations would quickly develop between the Novgorodians and Viborg's commander, Sten Turesson Bielke. The negotiations would however fail and the Novgorodians would return to Novgorod. soon after forces from Viborg went ravaging in Ladoga and Novgorodian Karelia. Although the Swedes failed to conquer Ladoga Fortress, they instead set fire to it. The Swedes went as far as Onega.

After the Swedish attack into Karelia and Ladoga, the Novgorodians responded by raiding the districts around Nemetski and Karelian towns, they would also devastate the countryside, burning the crops and killing many cattle. They would later return with many captives as well.

Later in the year, another Swedish expedition goes against Ingria, the Swedes ravaged the town of Toldoga and went further into "the country of the Vod people" but due to their caution took nothing from it. The expedition eventually ended in a decisive defeat for the Swedes who were repulsed by troops from Kopore under the command of Fedor Vasilevich. During the main battle, Michail Koporanin, who was according to the Novgorod Chronicle a "good man" was killed by the Swedes. The Swedes also wounded the horse of Feodor, but he remained unharmed.

== Aftermath ==
The fighting between Sweden and Novgorod dragged on until the winter of 1338, when envoys from Viborg arrived in Novgorod and achieved a peace treaty with them. They claimed that Sten Turesson Bielke had acted on his own accord without approval from the king of Sweden. The peace treaty was based on the earlier treaty signed in 1323.
