= Häme War =

War between Sweden and Novgorod

- Part of the Swedish–Novgorodian Wars
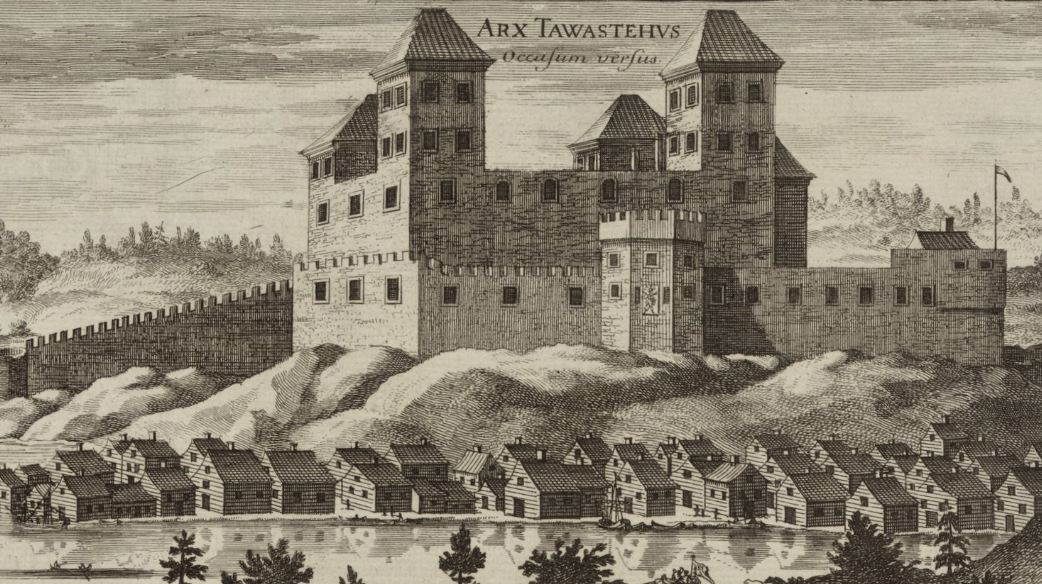
- Castle of Tavastehus from the west, by Johannes van den Aveelen in the 17th century.
Date	Early 1311 – 1314
Location	Finland
Result	See result
Territorial changes	Status quo ante bellum

Belligerents
Sweden; Korela rebels	Novgorod

Commanders and leaders
(History of Sweden (800–1521)) Birger Magnusson (History of Sweden (800–1521)) Eric Magnusson (History of Sweden (800–1521)) Valdemar Magnusson (History of Sweden (800–1521)) Tuke Jonsson	Dimitri Romanovitj; Jurij Danilovitj; Konstantin †

Units involved
(History of Sweden (800–1521)) Tavastehus garrison	Ladoga garrison

Strength
Unknown	Unknown

Casualties and losses
Unknown	Unknown

The Häme War (Swedish: Tavastehuskriget) was a war between the Kingdom of Sweden and the Novgorod Republic from 1311 to 1314.

== Background ==
The Swedish eastern policy had become very passive because of the long fight between the Swedish king, Birger Magnusson, and his brothers Eric and Valdemar which had plagued Sweden since 1304. However, in 1311, the Novgorodians attack Finland and thus began a new conflict between Sweden and Novgorod.

== War ==
=== 1311 ===
In the beginning of 1311, the Novgorodians, under the command of Dmitri Romanovich, attacked Tavastia. They quickly occupied the Kupets river after having crossed the sea and burned villages and captured the people living there. and after having gone along the coast they began marching towards Tavastehus. When a Swedish troop began pursuing the Novgorodians, the son of Ilya Stanimirovich, Konstantin, was killed. The Novgorodians would then occupy the entire "Black river" and then follow along this river to the fortress of Tavastehus.

==== Siege of Tavastehus ====
When the Novgorodians reached Tavastehus, they quickly captured the town, with the defenders falling back into the fortress. The forecourt was quickly razed by the Novgorodians due to it being made out of wood. The Swedish defenders asked the Novgorodians for peace, but the Novgorodians quickly refused. Instead, they initiated a siege of the fortress. The besieging Novgorodians had a hard time reaching the fortress itself, as it was built on a tall cliff. After a three-day long siege, the Novgorodians lifted their siege and began marching home.

The Dukes Eric and Valdemar took revenge for the attack by attempting to closing off the trade to Narva, but this ended in failure.

=== 1312—1314 ===
In the beginning of 1312, a conflict between MIchael of Moscow and Novgorod broke out. In Sweden, however, the long lasting fighting between Birger and his brothers had ended, and Birger began establishing an expansive eastern policy. He thus decided to begin arming a new army for the following year.

In 1313, an expedition under the command of Tuke Jonsson went towards the Ladoga region. Since the Ladoga posadnik along with the soldiers inside Ladoga had gone out to fight, the Swedes under Tuke managed to burn down Ladoga. The Novgorod Chronicle describes the reason for this action as "for our sins"

In 1314, rebels in Korela manage to take advantage of the crisis in Novgorod and they killed their Russian "oppressors" and called in the Swedes. However, soon afterwards, Jurij Danilovitj manages to crush the uprising and drive the Swedes away from Ladoga.

== Aftermath ==
Active hostilities ended in 1315. The outcome of the war is not clear, since the invasions of the Novgorodians were repulsed with losses for them, but the attempts of the Swedes to capture Kexholm ended in failure.
