= Battle of the Neva =

1240 battle of the Swedish–Novgorodian Wars

Coordinates: 59°48′27″N 30°36′15″E

- Part of the Swedish–Novgorodian Wars
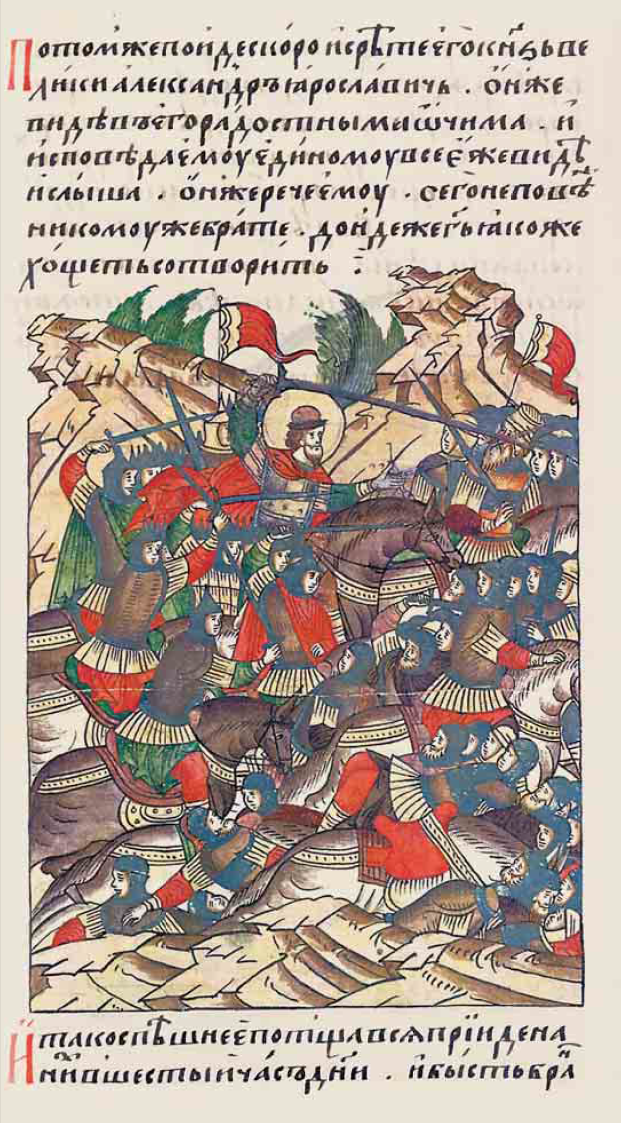
- Depiction of the battle in the late 16th century illuminated manuscript of Ivan the Terrible
Date	15 July 1240
Location	Neva River, Russia
Result	Novgorodian victory

Belligerents
Novgorod Republic: People of Ladoga	Kingdom of Sweden: Finns; Tavastians; Norwegians

Commanders and leaders
Alexander Yaroslavich (Note: Nicknamed Nevsky ('of the Neva') for the battle.)	Ulf Fase (arguably); Spiridon †

Casualties and losses
Novgorod First Chronicle: 20 killed	Novgorod First Chronicle: "great number"

The Battle of the Neva (Russian: Невская битва, romanized: Nevskaya bitva; Swedish: slaget vid Neva; Finnish: Nevan taistelu) was fought between the Novgorod Republic, along with Karelians, and the Kingdom of Sweden, including Norwegian, Finnish and Tavastian forces, on the Neva River, near the settlement of Ust-Izhora, on 15 July 1240. The battle is mentioned only in Russian sources, and it remains unclear whether it was a major invasion or a small-scale raid. In Russian historiography, it has become an event of massive scale and importance.

== Background ==
Pope Honorius III (1216–1227) received a number of petitions regarding new Baltic crusades, mainly concerning Prussia and Livonia but also a report from the Swedish Archbishop concerning difficulties with their mission in Finland. At that time, Honorius responded to the Swedish archbishop only by declaring an embargo against trade with pagans in the region; it is not known if the Swedes requested further help for the moment.

In 1237, the Swedes received papal authorization to launch a crusade. Probably in 1238 or 1239, they made a successful campaign into Tavastia in Finland, known as the "Second Swedish Crusade" in later historiography. In 1240, new campaigns began in the easternmost part of the Baltic region and the Swedes advanced further east. The Swedish eastward expansion led to a clash between Sweden and Novgorod, since the Karelians had been allies and tributaries of Novgorod since the mid-12th century, and Novgorod had a monopoly over the Karelian fur trade. The Swedish expansion was stopped at the Battle of the Neva by a Novgorodian army led by Prince Alexander Yaroslavich.

== Russian sources ==
The existence of the battle is known only from Russian sources. The first source to mention the battle is the Novgorod First Chronicle from the 14th century. According to the chronicle, on receiving the news of the advancing Swedish, Norwegian, Finnish and Tavastian fleets, the 19-year-old Prince Alexander Yaroslavich of Novgorod quickly moved his small army and local men to face the enemy before they had reached Lake Ladoga. The chronicle described the battle as follows:

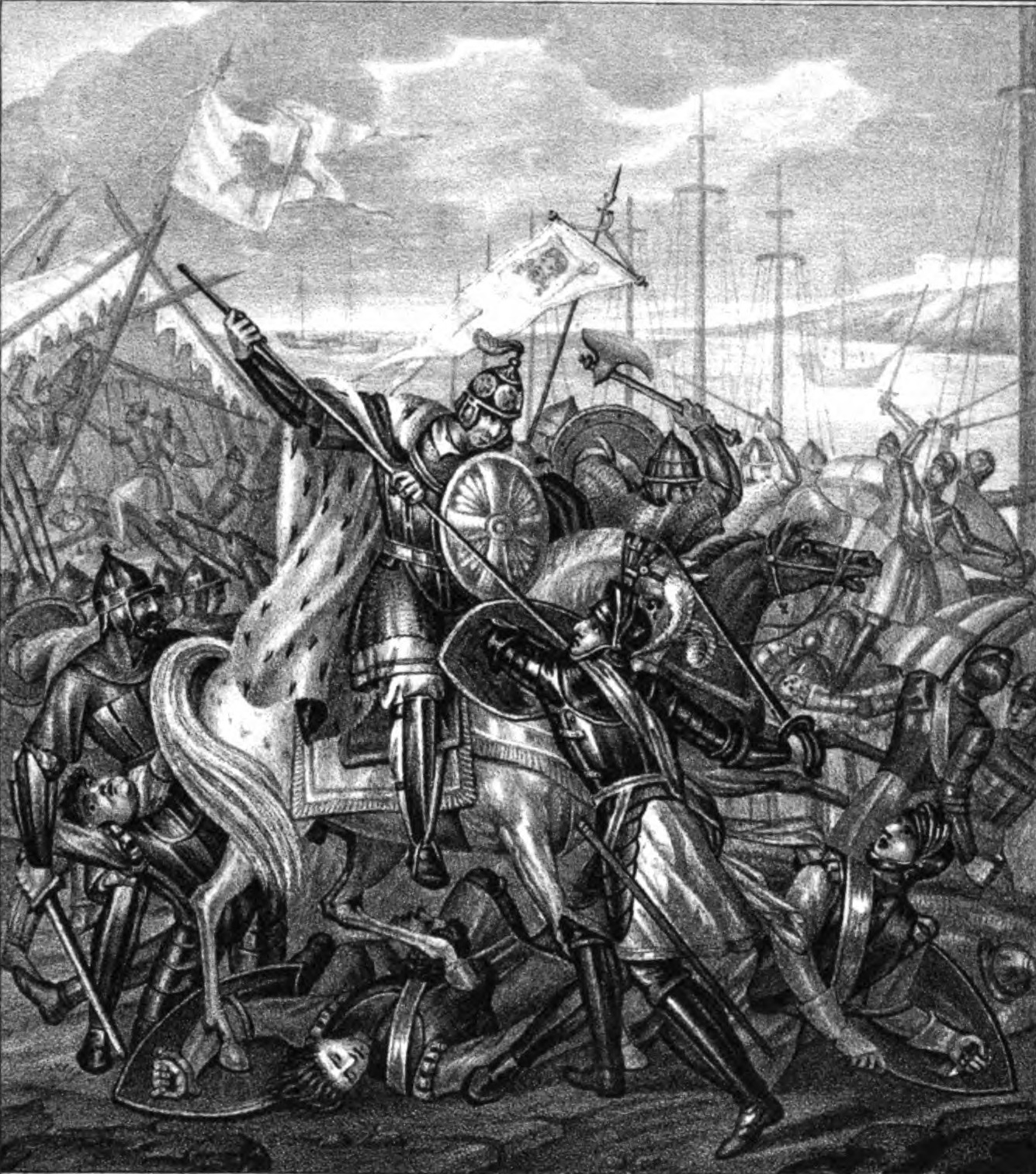
Alexander Nevsky Fighting the Swedes, by Boris Chorikov

"Swedes came with a great army, and Norwegians and Finns and Tavastians with ships in great numbers, Swedes with their prince and bishops, and they stayed on the Neva, at the mouth of the Izhora, willing to take Ladoga, and then Novgorod and all of its lands. But still protected the merciful, man-loving God us and sheltered us from the foreign people, and the word came to Novgorod that Swedes were sailing to Ladoga; but prince Alexander did not hesitate at all, but went against them with Novgorodians and people of Ladoga and overcame them with the help of Saint Sophia and through prayers of our lady, the Mother of God and Virgin Mary, 15 July, in the memory of Kirik and Ulita, on Sunday, (the same day that) the 630 holy fathers held a meeting in Chalcedon; and there was a great gathering of the Swedes; and their leader called Spiridon was killed there; but some claimed that even the bishop was slain; and a great number of them fell; and when they had loaded two ships with the bodies of high-born men, they let them sail to the sea; but the others, that were unnumbered, they cast to a pit, that they buried, and many others were wounded; and that same night they fled, without waiting for the Monday light, with shame. Of Novgorodians there fell: Konstantin Lugotinitch, Gyuryata Pinyashchinich, Namest, Drochilo Nezdylov son of the tanner, but including the people of Ladoga 20 men or less, God knows. But prince Alexander came back home with Novgorodians and people of Ladoga, all well, protected by God and Saint Sophia and all the prayers of the holy men."

A 16th-century version of the battle gave plenty of additional details, expanding the conflict to biblical proportions, but otherwise following the earlier described developments.

Prince Alexander Yaroslavich was given the epithet Nevsky ('of Neva') by a 15th century chronicler.

Two years later, in 1242, Alexander stalled an invasion of the Teutonic Order and Bishopric of Dorpat during the Battle on the Ice. Despite the victories there were no Novgorodian advances further west to Finland or Estonia.

== Swedish sources ==
There is no reference to a battle of the Neva in Swedish sources.

=== Situation in Sweden ===
After the death of King Johan Sverkersson in 1222, Sweden was in a de facto state of civil war until 1248 when Birger Jarl managed to seize power in the kingdom. Unrest was due to the struggle between those who wanted to keep the old tribal structure, the folkung party, and the king, who was assisted by the church. Folkungs, who were mainly from Uppland, stoutly resisted the centralization of power, taxation of the Swedes of Uppland, and church privileges.

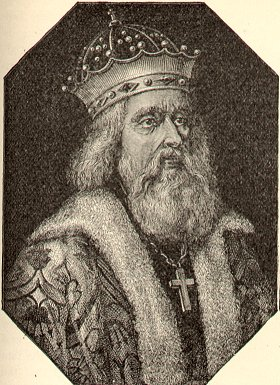
Battle of the Neva contributed to Alexander's sainthood

Furthermore, the official Sweden was on the brink of war with Norway ever since the Norwegians' infamous Värmland expedition in 1225. Relations improved only after the Treaty of Lödöse in 1249, which was forged by the newly empowered Birger Jarl.

=== Theories ===
Taking these facts into consideration, it was suggested in a 2004 book aimed at a wide readership that the Swedish expedition may have been an indirect result of the papal letter in 1237 that was sent to the Swedish Archbishop of Uppsala. The letter eloquently called for a crusade, not against Novgorod, but against Tavastians in Finland, who had allegedly started hostilities against the church. In his defunct position, the king may not have been willing or able to act, but the letter may have provided the frustrated folkungs an opportunity to regain part of their Viking Age glory. Mostly free to act without interference from the king, folkungs would have been able to raise an army of their own, get volunteers from Norway and even assistance from Thomas, the independent Bishop of Finland, who needed to constantly worry about attacks from the east. Instead of Tavastia, this mixed set of interests and nationalities would have headed for the more lucrative Neva and there met its fate at the hands of Alexander. In the possible aftermath of the said battle, the King of Norway approached his Swedish counterpart for peace talks in 1241, but was turned down at the time.

However, some recent research has fundamentally questioned the importance of the battle, seeing it as an ordinary border skirmish that was exaggerated for political purposes, thus also explaining its absence from Swedish and other western sources.

Additional theories are numerous. The dating of the Swedish Crusade to Tavastia is controversial. Traditionally dated to 1249–1250 based on the chronology of Erikskrönikan, many scholars now consider it more likely that the expedition took place in 1238–1239. (See Second Swedish Crusade § Dating controversy) This would suggest that the Swedish forces at Neva were led by Birger Magnusson (later known as Birger Jarl), eight years before his appointment as jarl.

The Pskov Chronicle and related chronicles do not mention the Norwegians, Finns, or Tavastian in their entries about the Swedish incursion to Neva. John H. Lind also finds it unlikely that the Norwegians could have joined the expedition, as King Haakon Haakonsson of Norway was occupied suppressing an uprising of Skule Bårdsson at the time. This also casts doubt on the participation of the Finns and the Tavastians. Lind suggests that the list of enemies may have been exaggerated by duplicating names from later entries, due to the great symbolic significance ascribed to the Battle of Neva.

=== Consequences ===
All in all, the first known Swedish military expedition against Novgorod after the events at the Neva took place in 1256, following folkungs' demise, peace with Norway and conquest of Finland. If the battle of the Neva had any long-term consequences, it was in Sweden's determination to take over Finland first before attempting to proceed further east.

== Legacy ==
In 2007, scholar Janet L. B. Martin wrote: "Novgorod and Sweden were competitors both for dominance over Finnic tribes north of the Novgorod lands and for control over access to the Gulf of Finland. The Swedish attack on the Neva River in July 1240 was one of a long series of hostile encounters over these issues, not, as is sometimes asserted, a full-scale campaign timed to take advantage of the Russians' adversity and aimed at conquering the entire Novgorodian realm. Nevertheless, Alexander's victory there was celebrated and became the basis for his epithet Nevsky."

== See also ==
- Battle of Lihula
- Bishop Thomas
- Second Swedish Crusade

== Bibliography ==
- Kari, Risto (2004), Suomalaisten keskiaika, WSOY, ISBN 951-0-28321-5
- Larsson, Mats G (2002). Götarnas Riken : Upptäcktsfärder Till Sveriges Enande. Bokförlaget Atlantis AB ISBN 978-91-7486-641-4
- Fonnesberg-Schmidt, Iben (2007). The popes and the Baltic crusades, 1147–1254. Brill. ISBN 9789004155022.
- Martin, Janet (2007). Medieval Russia: 980–1584. Second Edition. E-book. Cambridge: Cambridge University Press. ISBN 978-0-511-36800-4.
- Fennell, John (2014) [1983]. The Crisis of Medieval Russia, 1200–1304. Longman History of Russia. Routledge. ISBN 978-0-582-48150-3.
