= Kexholm War =

War between Sweden and Novgorod

- Part of the Swedish–Novgorodian Wars
Date	1321–1323
Location	Finland (Viborg, Korela)
Result	Treaty of Nöteborg
Territorial changes	The border between Novgorod and Sweden is established

Belligerents
(History of Sweden (800–1521)) Sweden	Novgorod Republic

Commanders and leaders
Unknown	Prince Yuri; Juri Danielovitsch

Units involved
(History of Sweden (800–1521)) Viborg garrison	Korela garrison

Strength
Unknown	6 battering rams

Casualties and losses
Heavy	Heavy

The Kexholm War (Swedish: Kexholmskriget) was a short-lived conflict between the Novgorod Republic and Sweden spanning from 1321 to 1323. It ended with the signing of the Treaty of Nöteborg, in which the border between the two countries was officially established for the first time.

Finland

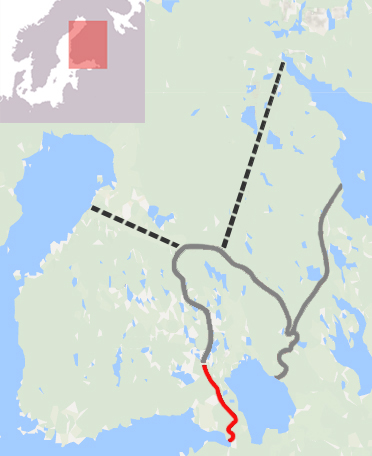
Map of Finland in 1323

== Background ==
In the mid-13th century, Sweden consolidated its rule over Tavastia and proceeded to expand into western Karelia in order to control the waterways between Lake Ladoga and the Gulf of Finland. The Novgorod Republic, a Russian city-state, relied on these waterways for its trade with Western Europe.

After the War of Deposition against Birger was over, the Swedes were once again able to resume their eastern policy with their military. Simultaneously, something had happened which made both Sweden and Novgorod want to make peace with the other. A possible reason is that the constant state of war was detrimental to trade in the region. At this time, the Teutonic Order also attacked Novgorod, which might have contributed to Novgorod wanting peace.

== War ==
=== 1321–1322 ===
Viborg and Korela fortress

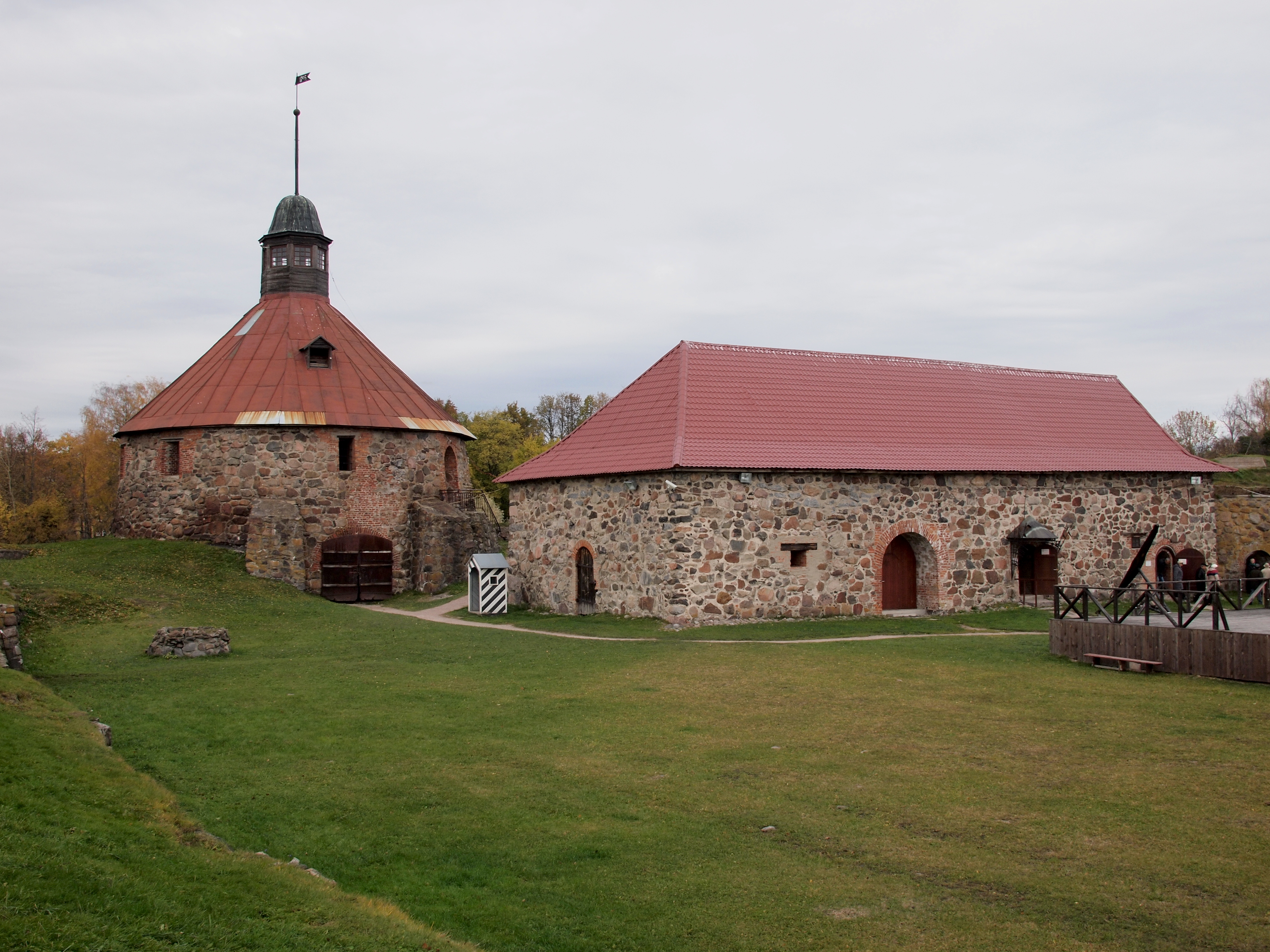
Korela fortress in Priozersk (Käkisalmi)

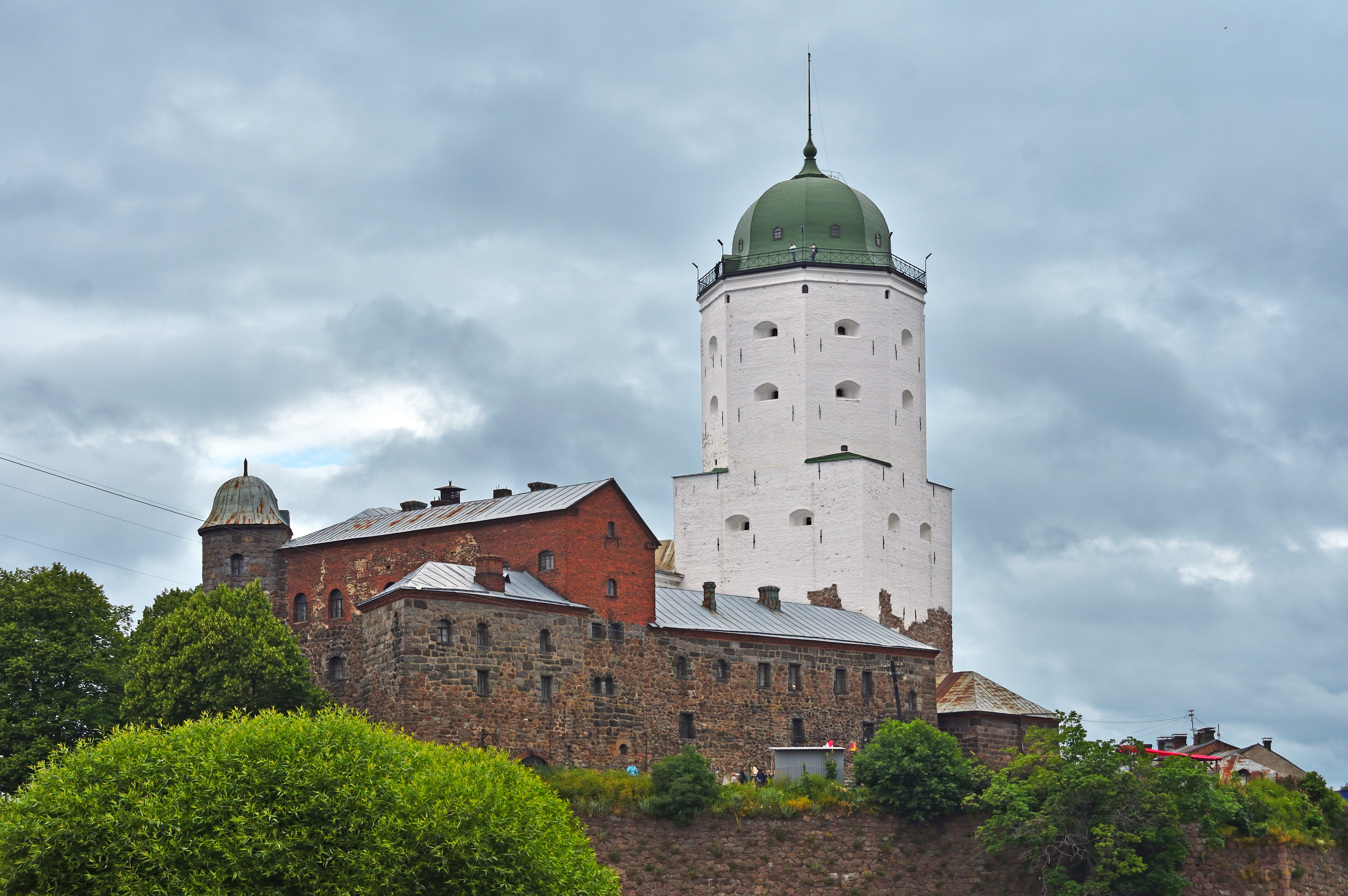
Vyborg Castle, Leningrad oblast, Russia

In 1321, Novgorodian troops attacked Viborg, not much is known about the attack except that it ended in failure for the Novgorodians and they were forced to retreat. In 1322, Prince Yuri arrived in Novgorod and ordered the people there to repair several battering rams, while they were being repaired, the Swedes attacked Korela, but this expedition ended in failure.

After this failure, Prince Yuri along with soldiers from Novgorod went to Viborg, and from the 12 August to 9 September they besieged it, the Novgorodians rammed the walls with six battering rams since the fortress was very strong. After they had broken into the town, the Novgorodians killed and hanged many of the people inside, with others being led to the low country. After having laid siege to the fortress for a month, they assaulted it, but this ended in failure, and they were forced to retreat. Despite the Novgorodians taking many prisoners, the fortress held strong.

After the failed siege of Viborg, the Novgorodians were eager to make peace, since new problems had sprung up at their southern border.

Yury of Moscow

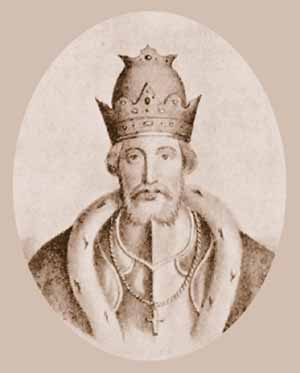
Jurij of Moscow (1303–1325)

=== 1323 and peace ===
Any fighting in 1323 is unknown, but it is at this time that representatives from both Sweden and Novgorod sat down to discuss peace. The negotiations took place at the newly established Nöteborg. The Swedish representatives were Erik Turesson, Hemming Ödgislesson, Peter Jonsson, and the priest Vämund. The Novgorodian representatives were very strong with the Prince of Novgorod himself attending. A certain Ludwig von Groten also acted as a mediator. When the negotiations were finished, the first ever "eternal peace" had been signed between Sweden and Novgorod, and the border was established for the first time in history.

== Aftermath ==
The Treaty of Nöteborg became a base of agreement between Sweden and Novgorod until the Treaty of Teusina in 1595, and all peace treaties until Teusina were listed as being additions of modifications of the aforementioned Treaty of Nöteborg.

== Sources ==
- Lind, John H. (2000). Bekker-Nielsen, Hans (ed.). "The Russian–Swedish Border according to the Peace Treaty of Nöteborg (Orekhovets-Pähkinälinna) and the Political Status of the Northern Part of Fennoscandia". Mediaeval Scandinavia. 13. Odense University Press: 100–117.
