= Swedish–Novgorodian Wars =

Medieval conflicts in Baltic region

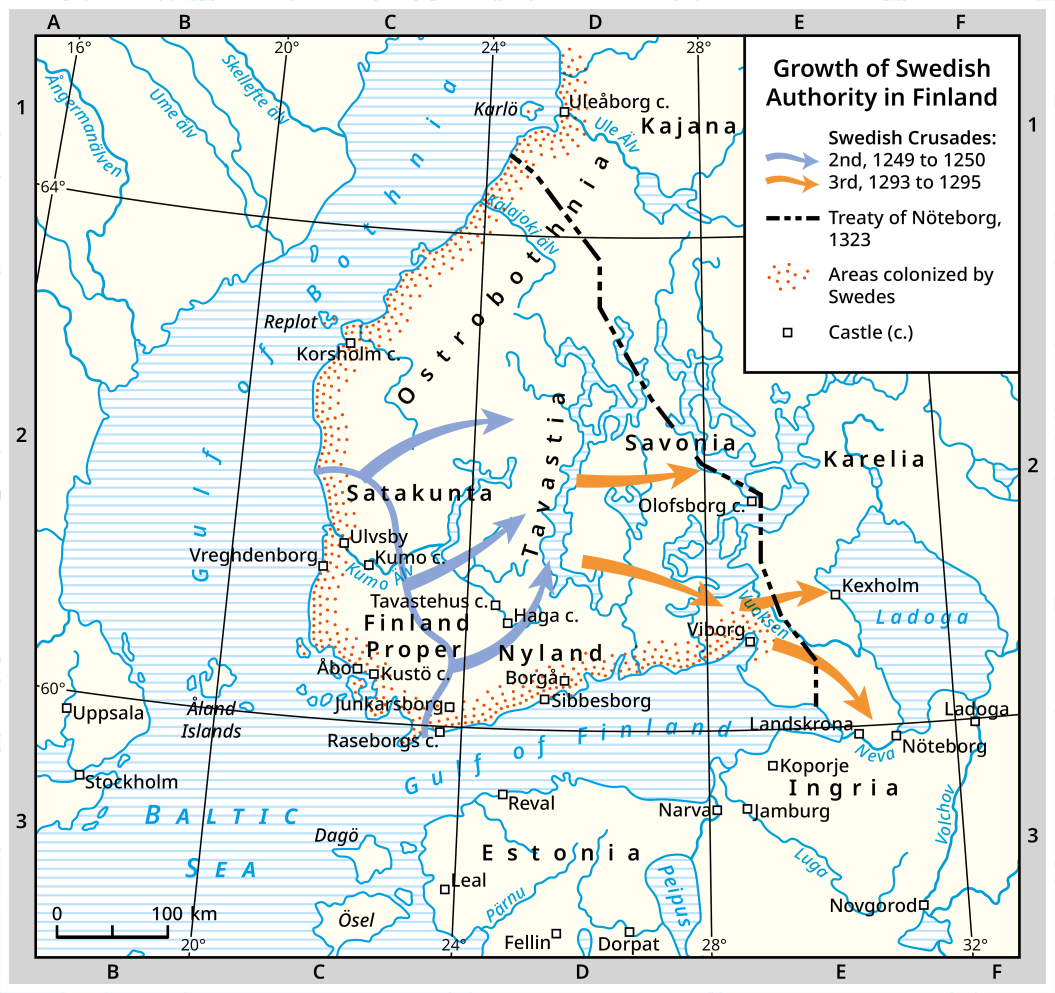
Swedish expansion in Finland during the 13th century

The Swedish–Novgorodian Wars were a series of armed conflicts in the 12th and 13th centuries between the Novgorod Republic and medieval Sweden over control of the Gulf of Finland. The area formed part of the trade route from the Varangians to the Greeks and was strategically important for commerce, later becoming significant to the Hanseatic League. The clashes between Catholic Swedes and Orthodox Novgorodians carried religious overtones, although no evidence exists of official crusade bulls being issued by the Pope before the 14th century.

== Background ==
Scandinavians maintained trade relations and other links with Novgorod from the Viking Age onwards. Merchants from Gotland operated both their own trading house (Gutagård) and Saint Olaf's Church in Novgorod. Scandinavians also conducted occasional raids on Novgorodian settlements. Eiríkr Hákonarson raided Ladoga in 997, and his brother Sveinn Hákonarson did the same in 1015.

Following the marriage of Yaroslav I, Grand Prince of Novgorod and Kiev, to Ingegerd of Sweden in 1019, Ladoga became a jarldom within the sphere of Kievan Rus'. It was administered by Ragnvald Ulfsson, who is alleged to have been the father of King Stenkil of Sweden (r. 1060–1066). Dynastic marriages between Rus' and Scandinavian royal families continued; for example, in the 1090s Stenkil's granddaughter Christina married Mstislav of Novgorod. After Mstislav's death in 1132, the Novgorod Republic seceded from Kievan Rus'.

== 12th century ==
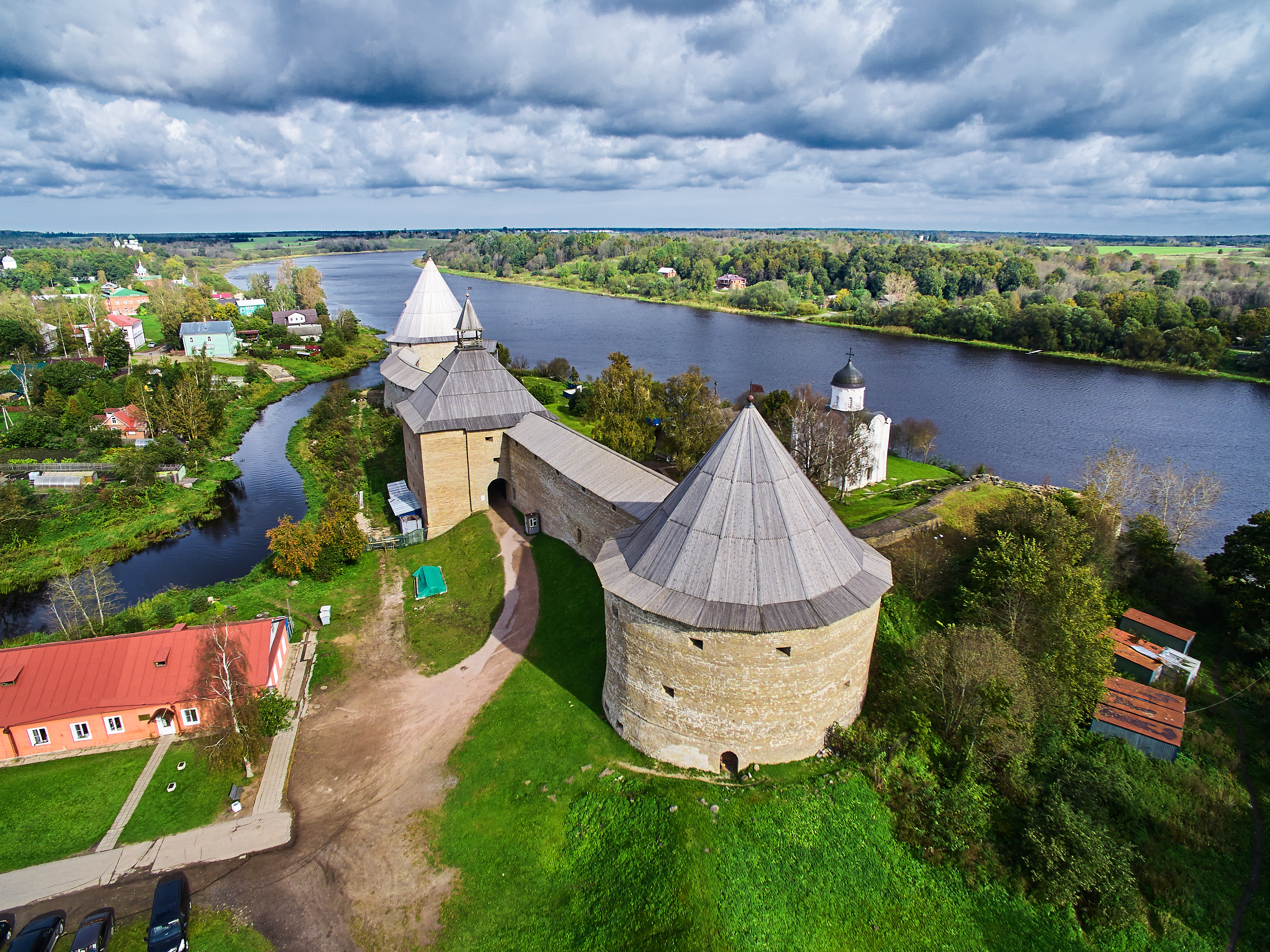
The fortress of Ladoga was built in stone in the 12th century and rebuilt about 400 years later.

Documentation for the 12th century is limited in Sweden, and East Slavic sources from this period are fragmentary.

=== In the Novgorod First Chronicle ===
Arnold Lelis (2005) noted that the Novgorod First Chronicle (NPL) records 42 instances of warfare between 1111 and 1205. Of these, 18 were conflicts with other Rus' principalities over dynastic succession, 11 with the Chud, and only 2 (in 1142 and 1164) with Swedes. The 1142 entry describes an incident involving merchants who may or may not have been "Novgorodian".

According to the sub anno 1142 entry, a "knyaz of the Svei with a bishop in sixty boats attacked merchants arriving from overseas in three vessels, killing about 150 of them." Scholars disagree on the interpretation of this passage: the identity of the merchants (Novgorodian or otherwise) is unclear, as is whether they were travelling to or from Novgorod. The account also leaves uncertain who defeated whom. Earlier historians such as Nikolay Karamzin (1826) and Vladimir Pashuto (1968) suggested that Novgorodian merchants overcame Swedish raiders. More recently, Beñat Elortza Larrea (2023) argued that the Swedish fleet intercepted and destroyed three Novgorodian merchant ships. Philip Line (2007) further observed that it remains uncertain whether the raid had official backing from the Swedish king or whether it was coordinated with the Yem people, who are recorded in the NPL as raiding Ladoga earlier in 1142 and again independently in 1149 and 1228.

The chronicle also reports under the year 1164 that a Swedish fleet of 55 ships approached Ladoga but was defeated on the river Voronai, with most of its ships captured by Novgorod. (Note: According to the Novgorod First Chronicle under the year 6672 (1164), the Svei brought 55 ships, of which 43 were captured and the rest escaped. The maximum mobilisation capacity of the Swedish ledung is estimated at about 280 ships, of which roughly a quarter could be deployed at one time. This would correspond to around 2,500 men. See Jokipii (2002), p. 5.)

=== In Erik's Chronicle ===
According to Erik's Chronicle, Karelians, supported by Novgorod, attacked mainland Sweden in the late 12th century and destroyed Sigtuna, then Sweden's most important city. However, Novgorodian sources do not mention this attack, and earlier Swedish texts describe the assailants only as "heathens", without identifying them further. The chronicle also recounts that Jon Jarl spent nine years fighting Novgorodians and Ingrians towards the end of the century. This account, however, is not corroborated by other sources.

== 13th century ==
Pope Honorius III (r. 1216–1227) received several petitions concerning new Baltic crusades, primarily focused on Prussia and Livonia, but also a report from the Swedish archbishop regarding difficulties with the mission in Finland. Honorius responded by declaring an embargo on trade with pagans in the region; it is not known whether the Swedes requested additional assistance at that time.

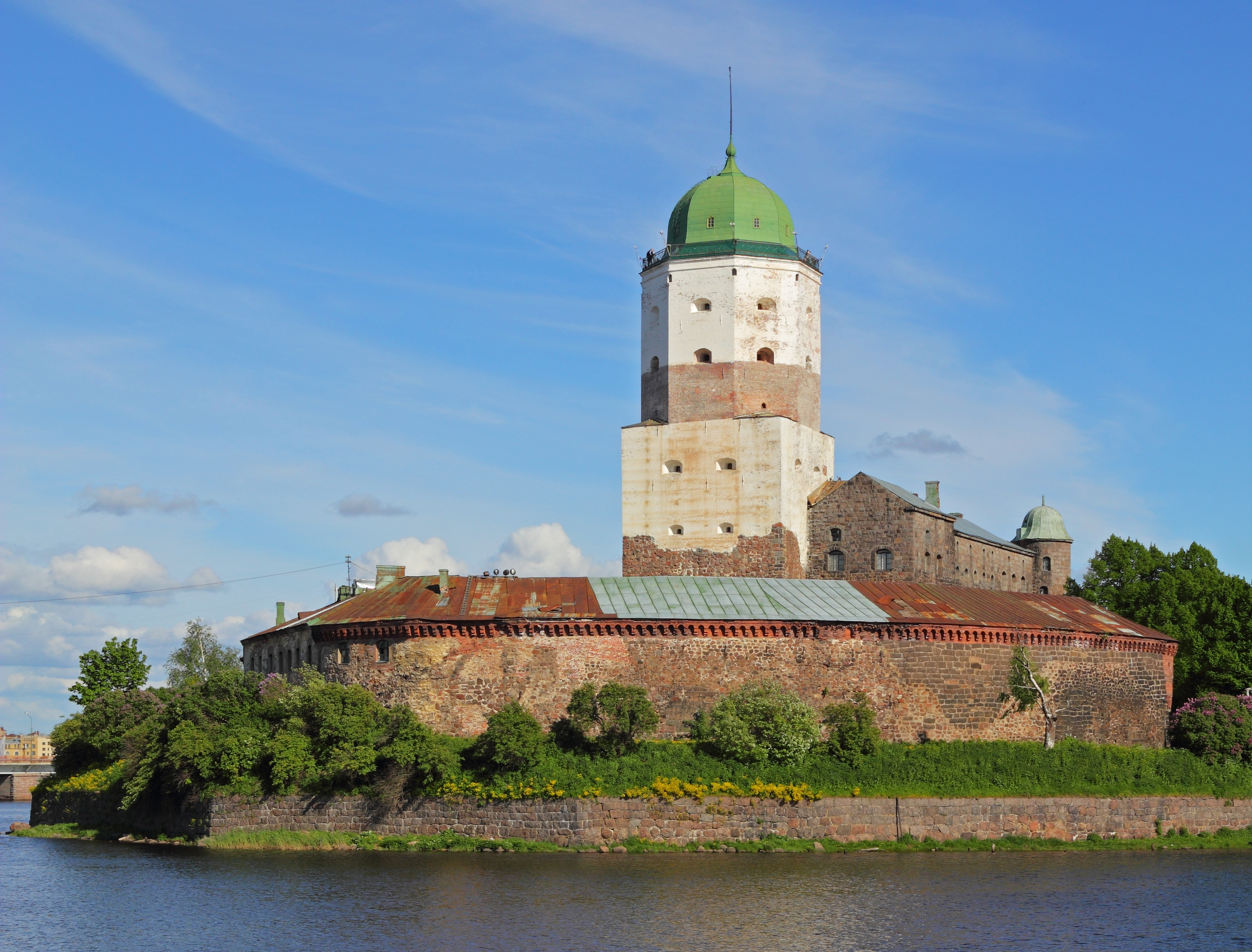
Vyborg Castle was founded by the Swedes in 1293.

The 1230s and 1240s marked the first papal involvement in Latin crusades against the Novgorod Republic. In 1237, the Swedes obtained papal authorization to launch a crusade, and in 1240 new campaigns were initiated in the easternmost part of the Baltic.

The Finnish mission's expansion eastward brought Sweden into conflict with Novgorod, as the Karelians had been allies and tributaries of Novgorod since the mid-12th century. Following a successful campaign in Tavastia, the Swedes advanced further east but were halted by a Novgorodian force led by Prince Alexander Yaroslavich, who reportedly defeated them at the Battle of the Neva in July 1240, earning the epithet Nevsky. The Novgorodian chronicle is the sole source for this engagement. (Note: The attack has sometimes been attributed to Birger Magnusson, who became jarl in 1248. The chronicle, however, names only "Spiridon" as a fallen enemy leader. Attempts have been made to identify Spiridon with Birger. The chronicle also claims that a bishop accompanying the army was killed, although no Swedish bishop is known to have died in 1240.) Novgorod opposed the crusade for economic reasons, particularly to defend its monopoly over the Karelian fur trade.

After 1240, Sweden concentrated its efforts on Finland, where it gradually consolidated control over western territories. Swedish forces did not return to the Neva until the end of the century. Earlier, in 1220, Sweden had unsuccessfully attempted to establish a foothold in Estonia at the Battle of Lihula. Novgorodian interests continued to clash with Sweden's in Finland, where Novgorodian expeditions are recorded on several occasions from the 11th century onward. A raid in the winter of 1226–1227 inflicted heavy losses on the Finns, while a Finnish retaliatory expedition against Ladoga in 1228 was defeated, contributing to Finland's eventual subjugation during the Second Swedish Crusade in 1249. In 1256, Novgorod retaliated with another major raid on Swedish Finland.

In 1293, the Swedes captured part of western Karelia and founded the fortress of Viborg, an expedition traditionally referred to as the Third Swedish Crusade. Seven years later, they established the fortress of Landskrona at the mouth of the Neva on the Okhta River, destroying Novgorodian settlements in the area. Later that year, Novgorodian troops counterattacked and destroyed Landskrona.

== 14th century ==
In 1311, the Novgorodians devastated central Finland, where the Swedes had recently built Hakoinen Castle, beginning the Häme War. In retaliation, a Swedish fleet sailed to Ladoga and set the trading post on fire. Three years later, dissatisfaction with Novgorodian rule erupted in Karelia, where locals killed Novgorodian governors and sought assistance from Sweden. After several months of conflict, Karelia again submitted to Novgorod's authority.

In 1318, Novgorod attacked Turku in southwestern Finland, burning the city, Turku Cathedral, and the episcopal castle at Kuusisto Castle. Four years later, Novgorod laid siege to Viborg and founded Oreshek, a fortress controlling the entrance to Lake Ladoga.

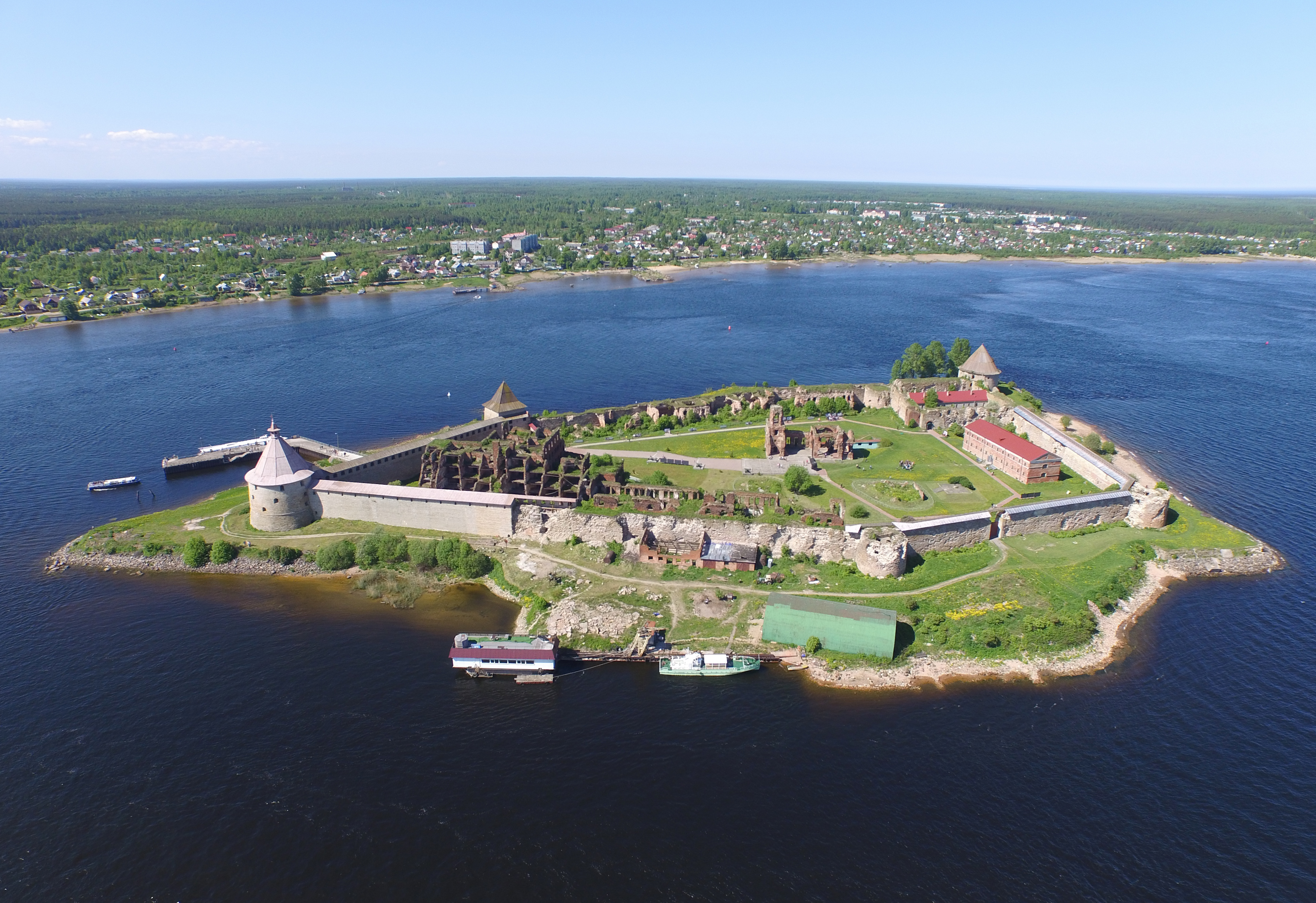
Oreshek, one of the fortresses built by Novgorodians to contain Swedish expansion.

Following the Kexholm War (1321–1323), the first treaties concluded between the belligerents were the Treaty of Nöteborg (12 August 1323) and, in 1326, the Treaty of Novgorod between Novgorod and Norway. Both agreements aimed to establish "eternal peace" in the region.

By 1328, Sweden was encouraging settlers to occupy the northern coast of the Gulf of Bothnia, defined by the treaty as belonging to Novgorod. In 1337, Karelians again rebelled against Novgorod, and King Magnus Eriksson sent troops in their support, briefly occupying Korela Fortress during Sten Bielke's war against Novgorod. The following year, Novgorod besieged Viborg, but an armistice was soon agreed.

After a decade of peace, Magnus IV resumed hostilities and demanded that the Novgorodians recognise papal authority. According to the Novgorod First Chronicle and Fourth Chronicle, the king insisted that the Novgorodians debate his "philosophers" (Catholic theologians) and that the losing side convert to the victor's faith. Archbishop Vasily Kalika of Novgorod consulted with the posadnik and other city leaders, and replied that, since Novgorod had received Christianity from Constantinople, the king should send his philosophers there to debate with the Byzantines.

After receiving this response, the king launched a crusade sending his army to Oreshek and set it ablaze, but Novgorod soon regained control. The king launched another unsuccessful attack in 1350. That same year, the Black Death reached Northern Europe, effectively halting further hostilities.

Later clashes were sporadic. Swedish attempts to assert control over the Gulf of Bothnia prompted Novgorod to begin constructing a castle near the Oulujoki delta in the 1370s. Sweden responded by establishing a fortress nearby. Novgorod attacked in 1377 but failed to capture it. The following year, Pope Gregory XI issued a crusade bull against Novgorod. Soon afterwards, Novgorodian forces withdrew from Ostrobothnia, leaving it under Swedish control.

By the late 14th century, Novgorod had established the fiefs of Korela, Oreshek, Koporye, Luga, and Ladoga as buffer territories between its core domains and Sweden. Several Lithuanian dukes noted for their military expertise—Narimantas, his son Patrikas, and later Lengvenis—were invited to govern this Ingrian duchy.

== 15th century ==
Hostilities between Novgorod and Sweden resumed in 1392 and 1411. By this time, Sweden was part of the Kalmar Union and was largely occupied with internal Scandinavian power struggles throughout the 15th century. The final recorded conflict occurred in 1445, several decades before Novgorod was incorporated into the Muscovy. Novgorod's fall did not bring lasting peace, and hostilities continued between Muscovy (later the Tsardom of Russia) and Sweden until the early 19th century.

== List of wars ==
Date	Conflict	Kingdom of Sweden and allies	Novgorod Republic and allies	Result
1164	Battle of the Voronezhka River	(History of Sweden (800–1521)) Kingdom of Sweden	Novgorod Republic	Novgorodian victory
1187	Pillage of Sigtuna	(History of Sweden (800–1521)) Kingdom of Sweden	Novgorod Republic? Karelians?	Novgorodian victory
1236–1237	Tavastian uprising	(History of Sweden (800–1521)) Kingdom of Sweden	Tavastians: Novgorod Republic; Karelians	Swedish victory
1238–1239 or c. 1249–1250	Second Swedish Crusade	(History of Sweden (800–1521)) Kingdom of Sweden	Tavastians: Novgorod Republic	Swedish victory
1240	Battle of the Neva	(History of Sweden (800–1521)) Kingdom of Sweden: Finns; Tavastians; Norwegians	Novgorod Republic	Novgorodian victory
1293–1295	Third Swedish Crusade	(History of Sweden (800–1521)) Kingdom of Sweden	Novgorod Republic	Swedish victory
1300–1301	Neva campaign	(History of Sweden (800–1521)) Kingdom of Sweden	Novgorod Republic	Novgorodian victory
1311–1314	Häme War	(History of Sweden (800–1521)) Kingdom of Sweden	Novgorod Republic	Inconclusive
1318	Attack on Åbo	(History of Sweden (800–1521)) Kingdom of Sweden	Novgorod Republic	Inconclusive
1321–1323	Kexholm War	(History of Sweden (800–1521)) Kingdom of Sweden	Novgorod Republic	Inconclusive: Treaty of Nöteborg
1338–1339	Sten Bielke's war against Novgorod	(History of Sweden (800–1521)) Kingdom of Sweden	Novgorod Republic	Swedish victory
1348–1351	Magnus Eriksson's crusade	Kingdom of Sweden	Novgorod Republic	Disputed
1377	Attack on Oulu	(History of Sweden (800–1521)) Kingdom of Sweden	Novgorod Republic	Swedish victory
1395	Storming of Yam	(History of Sweden (800–1521)) Kingdom of Sweden	Novgorod Republic	Novgorodian victory
1396	Northern Ladoga Campaign	(History of Sweden (800–1521)) Kingdom of Sweden	Novgorod Republic	Inconclusive
1404	Swedish-Novgorodian conflict	(History of Sweden (800–1521)) Kingdom of Sweden	Novgorod Republic	Inconclusive
1408–1409	Swedish-Novgorodian conflict	(History of Sweden (800–1521)) Kingdom of Sweden	Novgorod Republic	Inconclusive
1411	Tiversk campaign	(History of Sweden (800–1521)) Kingdom of Sweden	Novgorod Republic	Swedish victory
1415	Campaign at the Gulf of Bothnia	(History of Sweden (800–1521)) Kingdom of Sweden	Novgorod Republic	Novgorodian victory
1444	Karl Knutsson's campaign against Novgorod	Kalmar Union (History of Sweden (800–1521)) Sweden (State of the Teutonic Order) Teutonic Order; Livonian Order	Novgorod Republic; Pskov Republic	Swedish victory
1448	Novgorod's war against Karl Knutsson	(History of Sweden (800–1521)) Kingdom of Sweden	Novgorod Republic	Inconclusive

== See also ==
- Capture of Novgorod (1611)
- Finnish–Novgorodian wars – Conflicts between the Novgorod Republic and northern Finnic tribes in the 11th-13th centuries

== Bibliography ==
=== Primary sources ===
- Novgorod First Chronicle (NPL, c. 1275), sub anno 6650 (1142)
  - (Church Slavonic Synodal Scroll critical edition) Izbornyk (1950). "Новгородская Первая Летопись Старшего Извода (синодальный Список). В лЂто 6649 [1141] — в лЂто 6688 [1180]" [Novgorod First Chronicle of the Older Edition (Synodal Scroll). In the year 6649 [1141] — in the year 6688 [1180]]. Izbornyk (in Church Slavic). Moscow / Leningrad: Academy of Sciences of the USSR. – digitised version of the late-13th-century Synodal Scroll edition (or "Older Edition") of the Novgorod First Chronicle (Synodalnyy NPL).
  - (modern English translation) Michell, Robert; Forbes, Nevill (1914). The Chronicle of Novgorod 1016–1471. Translated from the Russian by Robert Michell and Nevill Forbes, Ph.D. Reader in Russian in the University of Oxford, with an introduction by C. Raymond Beazley and A. A. Shakhmatov (PDF). London: Gray's Inn. p. 237.
- Erik's Chronicle (c. 1330)
  - (modern English translation) The Chronicle of Duke Erik : a Verse Epic from Medieval Sweden (2012).

=== Literature ===
- Carlsson, G. (1925). "Tord Röriksson Bonde". sok.riksarkivet.se. National Archives of Sweden.
- Fonnesberg-Schmidt, Iben (2007). The popes and the Baltic crusades, 1147–1254. Brill. ISBN 9789004155022.
- Harrison, Dick (2002). "Härskare i Finland" [Ruler in Finland]. Karl Knutsson: en biografi [Karl Knutsson: a biography] (in Swedish). Historiska Media. ISBN 9789189442580.
- Larrea, Beñat Elortza (2023). Polity Consolidation and Military Transformation in Medieval Scandinavia: A European Perspective, c.1035–1320. The Northern World. Brill. p. 396. ISBN 978-90-04-54349-2.
- Lelis, Arnold A. (2005). "The View From the Northwest: the Chronicle of Novgorod as the mirror of local experience of Rus' history, 1016–1333". Russian History. 32 (3/4). Brill: 389–399. doi:10.1163/187633105X00204. ISSN 0094-288X. JSTOR 24663271.
- Line, Philip (2007). Kingship and State Formation in Sweden: 1130 – 1290. The Northern World. Brill. p. 697. ISBN 978-90-04-15578-7.
- Murray, Alan V., ed. (2009). The clash of cultures on the medieval Baltic frontier. Farnham: Ashgate. ISBN 978-0-7546-6483-3.
  - Paul, Michael C. (2009). "Archbishop Vasilii Kalika of Novgorod, the Fortress of Orekhov and the Defence of Orthodoxy". In Murray, Alan V. (ed.). The Clash of Cultures on the Medieval Baltic Frontier. Farnham, UK; Burnlington, VT: Ashgate. p. 266. ISBN 978-0-7546-6483-3.
- Pashuto, Vladimir (1968). Внешняя политика Руси [The foreign policy of Rus'] (in Russian). Moscow: Nauka.
- Shkvarov, Alexei (2012). Россия и Швеция. История военных конфликтов 1142-1809 [Russia and Sweden. The history of military conflicts 1142-1809] (in Russian). Saint-Petersburg: RME Group Oy:Алетейя. p. 576. ISBN 978-5-91419-754-1.
- Sundberg, Ulf (1998). Medeltidens svenska krig [Medieval Swedish Wars] (in Swedish) (1st ed.). Stockholm: Hjalmarson & Högberg. p. 458. ISBN 9189080262.
- Nordberg, Michael [in Swedish] (1996). I kung Magnus tid: Norden under Magnus Eriksson: 1317-1374 [In the time of King Magnus: The North under Magnus Eriksson: 1317-1374] (in Swedish). Stockholm: Norstedt. ISBN 9119521227.
