= Attack on Åbo (1318) =

Part of the Swedish-Novgorodian Wars

- Part of the Swedish–Novgorodian Wars
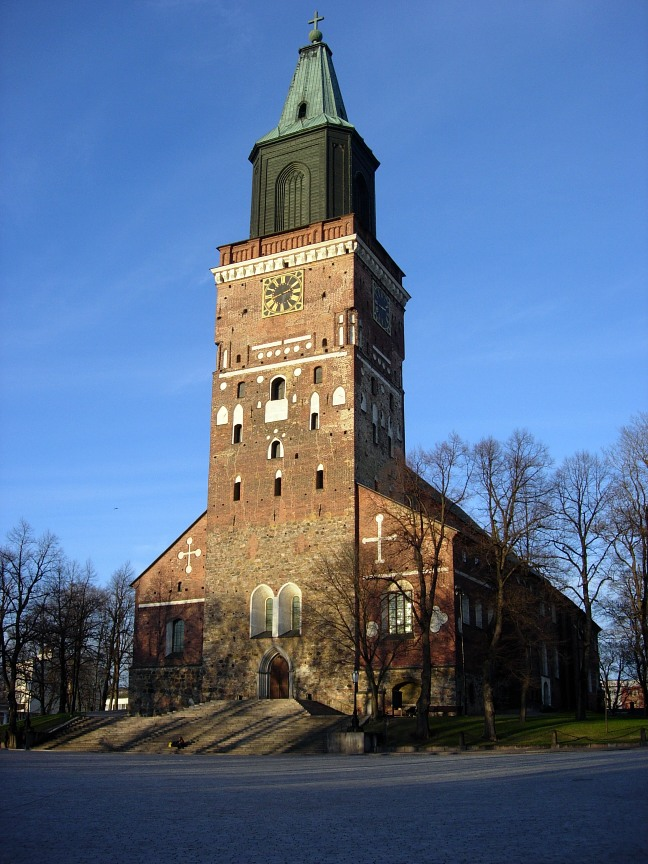
- The Cathedral of Turku
Date	1318
Location	Åbo (Turku), Finland, Kingdom of Sweden
Result	Inconclusive

Belligerents
Sweden	Novgorod

Commanders and leaders
Lyder van Kyren	Unknown

The Attack on Åbo was launched by the Novgorod Republic on the Swedish city of Åbo (Turku, in present-day Finland) in 1318. The Novgorodian goal of capturing the city failed, but they managed to burn the outskirts.

== Prelude ==
At the beginning of the 13th century, the eastern Swedish expansion began to slow down. This was mainly due to the fact that when Sweden extended further east, the more resistance was given by Novgorod. With the uprising against the Swedish king in 1317, the Novgorodians decided to take advantage of the chaotic situation in Sweden.

== Attack ==
In the summer of 1318, the Novgorodians invaded along the coast and on 11 July the defenders of Åbo were overwhelmed, the nearby bishopric Kustö was captured and burned down, in the fire, the bishop's archives which included all of Finland's earlier history were destroyed. However, the commander of Åbo Castle, Lyder van Kyren, was able to defend the castle, and soon after, the Novgorodians retreated. The Novgorodian attack was likely an attempt to consolidate their control over the region.

== Aftermath ==
After the attack, the Novgorodians offensive capability was quickly exhausted, which forced them to adopt a restrictive campaign against the Swedes. The Novgorod First Chronicle speaks of a Swedish attack against the areas around Ladoga in 1317, which was likely another reason for the Novgorodian attack on Åbo. Since the two powers were incapable of annihilating the other, the two, with instigation from the Hanseatic League, signed the Treaty of Nöteborg (Oreshek) in 1323. This agreement for the first time formally established the border between the two, cutting the Karelian Isthmus in two, following the course of the Vuoksi, crossing Savo towards the northwest, and reaching the north of the Gulf of Bothnia. following the Pyhäjoki.

== See also ==
- Sack of Turku (1509) – Danish attack on Turku
