= Battle of the Voronezhka River =

1164 battle

Battle of the Voronezh River
Date	May 28, 1164
Location	river Voronezhka
Result	Novgorod victory

Belligerents
Novgorod Republic	Kingdom of Sweden

Commanders and leaders
Svyatoslav Rostislavich	???

Units involved
55 shnukov, from 2,200 to 3,300 warriors	

Casualties and losses
43 Shnuka	Heavy

The Battle of the Voronezhka River on May 28, 1164, was a victory of the Novgorod Republic over Swedish troops on the Voronoi River (now the river Voronezh in the Volkhovsky district Leningrad region).

Ladoga was besieged by the Swedes who invaded Novgorod land. The first attack proved fruitless, the Swedes suffered heavy losses and retreated to the Voronezhka River. 5 days later, Svyatoslav came with the Novgorodians and defeated the Swedes. According to the chronicle, "they escaped and died a little" (the wounded).

The Novgorodians won, led by their posadniks Zahariya and Nezhatoy and Novgorod Prince Svyatoslav Rostislavich. Information about the siege of Ladoga and the Battle of Voronezh remained in The First Novgorod Chronicle. According to legend, in honor of this victory, St. George's Church was built in the Ladoga Fortress.

After this defeat, the Swedes did not attack the Novgorod lands for 76 years.

== Memory ==
Since 2012, in the village Samushkino Volkhovsky district is hosting the Victory of the Russian Soldiers holiday.
