= Karl Knutsson's campaign against Novgorod =

War between Sweden and Novgorod

- Part of the Swedish–Novgorodian Wars
Date	Autumn 1444
Location	Gulf of Finland, Narva
Result	German–Swedish victory

Belligerents
Kalmar Union; (History of Sweden (800–1521)) Sweden; (State of the Teutonic Order) Teutonic Order; Livonian Order	Novgorod; Pskov Republic

Commanders and leaders
(Kalmar Union) Christopher of Bavaria (History of Sweden (800–1521)) Karl Knutsson	Maxim (POW)

Units involved
(History of Sweden (800–1521)) Forces from Viborg	Unknown

Strength
Unknown	Unknown

Casualties and losses
Likely low	Many killed 28 captured

Karl Knutsson's campaign against Novgorod (Swedish: Karl Knutsson Bondes tåg mot Novgoroderna) was a successful Swedish-German campaign by the commander of Viborg, Karl Knutsson, against Novgorodian and Pskov forces during their war with the Teutonic Order in 1444.

== Background ==
In 1436, the Swedish council sent a proposal to the Livonian master of the order, Heinrich von Vincke, about a possible alliance against the Novgorodians. This proposal was then seconded by Heinrich the same year when he sent another proposal to Christopher of Bavaria about a cooperation against the Novgorodians.

Christopher would later promise the Teutonic Order that he would not allow his kingdoms to trade with Novgorod, and he also sent Karl Knutsson with a force from Viborg against Pskov.

== Campaign ==
In May 1444, it was clear to Karl Knutsson that the Novgorodians were about to attack Narva, and he warns the Estonians in the area about what was about to occur. In the autumn 1444, the awaited Russian attack began and Christopher sent Karl Knutsson with troops to support Narva. The Novgorodian chronicle claims that Karl "went down to the Narva river and cut down many Russians and captured a number of distinguished men" The number of people captured was 28 and among them was the son of the Posadnik Larivonov, Maxim. The people captured by the Swedes would later by freed after the Novgorodians paid for their ransom a year later.

== Aftermath ==
Some time after his campaign, the Teutonic Order and Novgorod agreed to a truce that would last until 1447. Karl Knutsson is considered to have saved the Narva area from worse clashes with Novgorod through skillful diplomacy.
