= Neva campaign =

War between Sweden and Novgorod

- Part of the Swedish–Novgorodian Wars
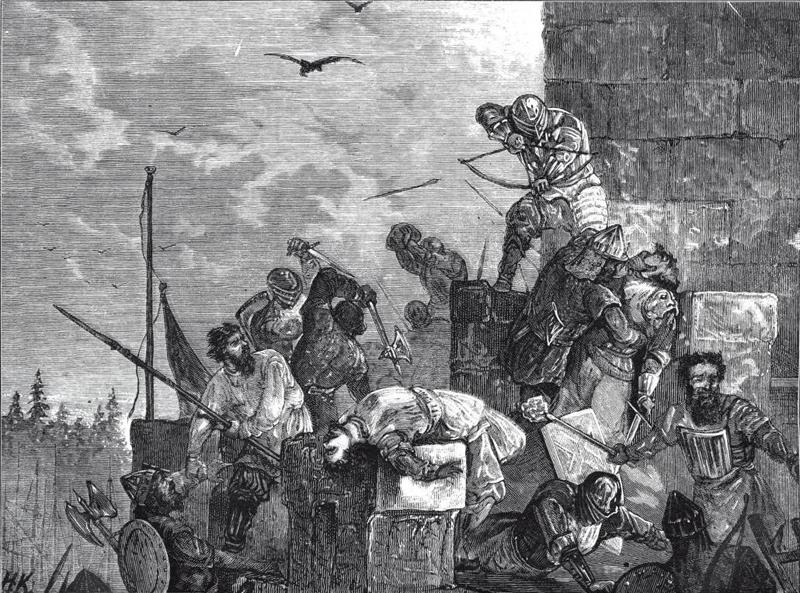
- Novgorodian capture of Landskrona in 1301
Date	Spring 1300–1301
Location	Neva River
Result	Novgorodian victory
Territorial changes	Landskrona is captured and destroyed by the Novgorodians

Belligerents
Novgorod Republic	Sweden

Commanders and leaders
Andrey Alexandrovich	Torkel Knutsson; Mathias Kettilmundsson; Mats Kettilmundsson; Peder Porse; Henrik von Küren; Ivan von Küren; Harald; Sten †

Units involved
Army of Nisowska	Landskrona garrison

Strength
1300; 31,000 men 1,000 lodja vessels (Swedish estimate) several thousands men (Russian estimate); Several fire ships 1301; Unknown, but larger than the Swedish army	1300; 1,100 men Several ships 1301; 300 men

Casualties and losses
Heavy	Almost the entire garrison was killed 118 captured

The Neva campaign (Swedish: Nevakampanjen) was a failed Swedish expedition to establish a fortress on the Neva River in 1300. The expedition was organized by Torkel Knutsson and it ended after the Novgorodians destroyed Landskrona in 1301 after a siege.

== Background ==
In 1300, Sweden prepared to make further conquests in Eastern Europe after the successful Third Swedish Crusade. The Swedes planned an attack against Neva, which was very bold considering how much it could threaten Novgorod's trade. According to a few sources, the Swedish expedition is meant to create a natural and easily defended border for Swedish Finland.

== Campaign ==
In the spring, Torkel Knutsson organized a large fleet, and began sailing with a force of around 1,100 men towards the east. Along with Torkel, many other notable people were following him on the expedition, these being: Mats Kettilmundsson, Peder Porse, Heinrich von Küren, and Ivan von Küren. Their target was the Neva river in the Gulf of Finland.

=== Construction of Landskrona ===
After their arrival, the Swedes immediately began constructing a fortress. It was most likely made out of wood and it was likely situated on a promontory between Neva and its tributary Okhta. The Swedes would name the fortress Landskrona, meaning Crown of the land.

The creation of the fortress on the Neva was tantamount to putting a stranglehold on the cities around Ladoga, which used the neva as their main connection with the western world.

The construction works would continue smoothly, but soon after a report came in that 1,000 "heathens" had arrived battle ready on a nearby islet. 800 men under the leadership of bailiff Harald from Tavastia is sent to defeat the heathens, but his force fell victim to a violent storm and was forced to return to Landskrona.

=== First assault on Landskrona ===
Soon after, the first attack on Landskrona occurred. The translator that demanded the capitulation of the fortress put the strength of the Novgorodians as high as 31,000, and the chronicle speaks of 1,000 lodja vessels, Russian sources estimate that the total strength of the Novgorodians did not exceed several thousand, but the request to capitulate was out of the question for Landskronas defenders and they promptly refused. The Novgorodians began the fighting by sending fire ships in formation against the Swedish fleet. The defenders of Landskrona had however previously put up a barricade and without causing any damage the fire ships burned harmlessly in front of the barricade. After the failed attack by the fire ships, the main assault was initiated. The main battle happened at the place defended by the "hälsingar".

It is unknown who the hälsingar were, but they eventually began falling back from the Novgorodian advance. Seeing this, the Swedish knights along with Mats Kettilmundsson, Peder Porse, Henrik von Küren, and Ivan von Küren attack the Novgorodians, at which point the Novgorodians "were sweating red". When the crisis had been averted, the Swedish knights continued their attack, at which point the Novgorodians opened their ranks to let the Swedes through, and then surround them. The Swedes were put in a bad situation, however, after mobilizing all of their forces, the Swedes managed to fight their way back to their lines. After this, the Novgorodian attack soon diminished and for a short period of time, the two armies stood in front of each other. During this standstill, Mats Kettilmundsson challenged the bravest Novgorodian to a duel, however, this challenge was never accepted, with the most common explanation being that the Novgorodians believed it to be a trap. Despite this, Mats gained great renown for his courage.

One night, likely in August, the Novgorodians retreated from the fortress. The construction of the fortress would continue steadily, with the patience of the knights in Landskrona began to wane due to the idle life there. Torkel Knutsson would quickly decide to return home to Sweden.

=== Torkel's departure from Landskrona ===
He left a force of around 300 men, consisting of 200 warriors and 100 military workers under the command of the knight Sten and began sailing towards Sweden. However, the strong winds made the journey impossible, and boredom makes the situation for the stationary Swedish fleet difficult. With this in mind, Mats Kettilmundsson goes on a raid into Estonia along with others. The Swedes ravage along the Estonian coast, which causes discontent in both Novgorod and Denmark, who both had interests in Estonia. When the winds eventually turned, the Swedish fleet was able to return to Sweden with no further issues.

=== Second assault on Landskrona ===
Early in the spring of 1301, a new and large Novgorodian and Nisowskan army under the command of Grand Duke Andrej stood outside of Landskrona. The Novgorodians began their attack by sending a small force to the mouth of the Neva, and began to cut down several trees. They put these cut down trees into the river to block it, protecting themselves from a relief fleet. The commander of Landskrona, Sten, along with a few healthy men from the Swedish garrison rode out to see what the Novgorodians were doing. After coming to the mouth of the river, he met no enemy, but when he began riding back towards Landskrona, he encountered a small group of Novgorodians, who attempted to ambush him. After fighting his way through the ambush, he encountered another troop, but also fought away that one and managed to come back to the fortress, wounded.

After the failed ambushes, the entire Novgorodian army organized and surrounded the fortress. and on 19 May, they assaulted Landskrona. At the time, the Swedish garrison only consisted of around 13–16 healthy men, with everyone else either being dead or sick. The Swedish garrison was suffering from starvation and sickness but still managed to give a strong defence against the Novgorodians. The few healthy men in the Swedish garrison, who were able to get protection from the fortresse's well-fortified places managed to keep up the battle for a long time, but this would ultimately be in vain, as they quickly succumbed to fatigue, and the Swedes quickly fell to the Novgorodian attack.

The Novgorodians set fire to the houses in the fortresses, with all the sick people inside the fortress being burned alive or stabbed, killing them. The commander, Sten, was also killed at this moment, who wanted to instead give himself over as a prisoner of war. A certain Carl Hack, who had put on a Russian coat, was stabbed to death by his own servant, who believed him to be one of the Novgorodians. Some of the Swedes hid inside a cellar, defending access it with such obstinacy that the Novgorodians could not overpower them and instead had to promise that they would not kill or harm the defenders.

== Aftermath ==
After the Novgorodians had captured the fortress, they were filled with so much hate that they immediately destroyed it. After destroying it, the Novgorodians took as much booty as possible and 118 prisoners. No further sources tell of any fighting on the eastern border of Finland from 1302 to 1310. But it is highly likely that the loss of Landskrona was a great disappointment to the Swedes.

== Works cited ==
- Sundberg, Ulf (1999). Medeltidens svenska krig [Swedish wars in the Middle Ages] (in Swedish). Stockholm: Hjalmarson & Högberg. pp. 103–104. ISBN 9789189080263.
- Sundberg, Ulf (2010). Sveriges krig (1050–1448) [Sweden's wars (1050–1448)] (in Swedish). Svenskt Militärhistoriskt Bibliotek. pp. 187–189. ISBN 9789185789610.
- Shaskolskiy, Igor (1987). Борьба Руси за сохранение выхода в балтийское море в XIV веке [Rus' struggle to preserve access to the Baltic Sea in the XIV century] (in Russian). Наука.
- Michell, Robert (1914). The Chronicle of Novgorod (PDF). LONDON OFFICES OF THE SOCIETY. pp. 114–115.
- Bäckström, P. O. (1884). SVENSKA FLOTTANS HISTORIA [The history of the Swedish fleet] (in Swedish). Norstedts förlag. pp. 15–16.
