= List of wars involving Sweden =

This is a list of wars and war-like conflicts involving Sweden.

Swedish victory
Swedish defeat
Another result *

*e.g. result unknown or indecisive/inconclusive, result of internal conflict inside Sweden, status quo ante bellum, or a treaty or peace without a clear result.

== Kingdom of Sweden (800–1397) ==
Conflict	Sweden and its allies	Sweden's opposition	Outcome
Swedish–Gothic wars (500–800) Location: Sweden	Svealand	Geats	Consolidation of Swedes and Goths into a unified kingdom.
Swedish slave revolts (500s) Location: Sweden	Svealand	Thralls	Slaves depose the king of Sweden and win their freedom.
Ingvars raid of Estonia (600s) Location: Estonia	Svealand	Estonians	Estonian Victory
Anunds raid of Estonia (700s) Location: Estonia	Svealand	Estonians	Swedish Victory
Battle of Brávellir (750s) Location: Brávellir	Svealand Estonians	Danes (tribe) Wends Geats	Swedish Victory Eastern Geatland falls under Swedish dominion
Paphlagonian expedition of the Rus'	Rus'/Swedish Vikings	Byzantine Empire	Successful raid
Swedish expedition to Courland (854)	Sweden	Curonians	Swedish victory
Swedish raids in the Mediterranean Sea (859) Location: Mediterranean Sea, Spain, Italy Luni, Italy	Swedes (Germanic tribe)	Islamic Spain; Carolingian Empire	Swedish victory
Swedish expedition to Courland (862)	Sweden	Curonians	Swedish victory
Swedish wars of conquest in Eastern Europe (850s-870) Location: Eastern Europe	Swedes (Germanic tribe)	Slavs; Curonians; Semigallians; Finnic peoples.	Swedish victory establishment of control over the Route from the Varangians to the Greeks and Starya Ladoga route.
Great Heathen Army (865–878)	Vikings: Swedes; Danes; Norwegians	Wessex Northumbria Mercia East Anglia	Swedes, Norwegians and Danes under Ragnar Lodbrok sons occupies England and establishes the Danelaw
Caspian expeditions of the Rus' (913–1041)	Kievan Rus; Swedes	Khazars Abbasid Caliphate	Swedes establish trade routes
Olof the Brashs conquest of Denmark (900s) Location: Denmark	Swedes (Germanic tribe)	Denmark	Swedish victory
Feud of the Sviatoslavichi (970s) Location: Kievan Rus	Vladimir the Great: Sweden; Veliky Novgorod	Oleg's coalition: Drevlians; Yaropolk's coalition: Kiev; Polotsk	Vladimir the Great victorious
Jomsviking–Swedish War (980s): Battle of Fýrisvellir; Location: Uppsala	Sweden	Jomsviking	Swedish Victory
Eric the Victorious invasion of Denmark (990s) Location: Hedeby Baltic Sea	Sweden	Denmark	Swedish Victory
Swedish invasion of the Holy Roman Empire (990s)	Sweden; Denmark	Holy Roman Empire	Unclear results
Olof Skötkonungs attack on Denmark Location: In Denmark	Sweden	Denmark	Swedish victory: Denmark is occupied by Olof; Sweyn Forkbeard is expelled
Viking expedition to Wendland Location: In Wendland	Sweden	Wends	Successful expedition
Battle of Svolder (999–1000) Location: In Øresund or near Rügen	Sweden; Denmark; Jarls of Lade	Norway	Swedish victory
Swedish Norwegian war (1015–1018): Battle of Nesjar (1016)	Sweden	Norway	Norwegian victory
Battle of Helgeå Location: In Helge å or in Uppland	Sweden; Norway	North Sea Empire; Kingdom of England	Anglo-Danish victory
Battle of Stiklestad Location: In Stiklestad	Sweden Olaf II of Norway	North Sea Empire	Anglo-Danish victory
Swedish support for Magnus invasion of Norway (1035) Location: In Øresund or near Rügen	Sweden Magnus the Good	North Sea Empire	Swedish victory Magnus the Good becomes king of Norway defeats the Danish forces
(1042) Ingvar the Far-Travelleds expedition: Battle of Sasireti; Location: Georgia (country)	Varangians Kingdom of Georgia	Byzantine Empire Duchy of Kldekari	Swedish defeat
Yaroslav the Wise and Mstislav of Chernigovs civil war Battle of Listven (1024) Location: Ukraine Russia	Kievan Rus' Varangians	Mstislav of Chernigov	Swedish defeat
Swedish–Norwegian War (1063) Location: Vänern	Sweden	Kingdom of Norway	Swedish defeat
Swedish–Norwegian War (1099–1101) Location: Unknown	Sweden	Norway	Inconclusive
First Swedish Crusade (1150) Location: Unknown	Sweden	Finns	Eventual incorporation of Southwest Finland into the Swedish kingdom
Sweyn III's invasion of Småland (1153)	Sweden	Denmark	Invasion failed
Harald Skraengs uprising (1182)	Harald Skraeng; Sweden	Denmark	Uprising quelled
Pillage of Sigtuna (1187) Location: Sigtuna	Sweden	Pagans from Eastern Baltic (probably Estonians or Karelians)	Sigtuna is sacked. Archbishop Johannes of Uppsala is killed.
Battle of Lihula (1220) Location: Lihula, Estonia	Sweden	Oeselians Rotalians	Death of jarl Karl the Deaf
Värmland campaign (1225/1249) Location: Värmland	Sweden	Norway	Peace of Lödöse
Saaremaa attack on Sweden (1226) Location: Unknown	Sweden	Saaremaa	Saarema take plunder and hostages
Attack on Tavastia (1227–1228) Location: Unknown	Sweden	Novgorod	Indecisive
Battle of Olustra (1229) Location: Södermanland or Östergötland	Eric XI	Knut Långe	Victory for Knut Långe: Knut Långe is crowned King of Sweden
Eric XI's reinstatement war (1234) Location: Unknown	Eric XI: Possibly supported by an army from Denmark	Knut Långe	Victory for Eric XI: Eric XI regains the throne; Death of Knut Långe
Livonian Crusade (13th century) Location: Estonia, Latvia	Crusade: Sword-Brothers; Livonian Order; Denmark; Duchy of Estonia; Principality of Rügen; Nordalbingia within Saxony; Bishopric of Riga; Bishopric of Dorpat; Sweden; Tālava; Christianized Livs, Letts, Estonians, Latgalians and Ungannians; Bishopric of Courland; Bishopric of Ösel–Wiek; Pskov Republic	Pagans (Indigenous peoples): Livs (Livonians); Latgalians; Curonians; Estonians; Oeselians; Selonians; Semigallians; Rotalians; Ungannians; Vends; Grand Duchy of Lithuania: Samogitians; Novgorod Republic; Principality of Polotsk; Principality of Smolensk	Crusader victory. However, the Swedish expedition ended in disaster
Tavastian uprising (1236–1237) Location: Finland	Sweden	Tavastians; Novgorod; Karelians	Uprising crushed: Swedish influence in Finland is preserved
Battle of Neva (1240)	Swedes, Norwegians, Finns and Tavastians	Novgorod Republic and Karelians	Novgorodian victory.
First Folkung Uprising (1247) Location: Sweden	Sweden	Folkung	Victory of the Swedish king
Second Swedish Crusade (1249–1250) Location: Finland	Sweden	Tavastians	Area of Tavastians and south-western Finland fall to Swedish rule, Häme Castle is founded

== Folkung era (1250–1389) ==
Conflict	Sweden and its allies	Sweden's opposition	Outcome
Second Folkung Uprising (1251) Location: Sweden	Sweden	Folkung: Danes; Germans	Swedish victory: Filip Knutsson captured and executed
Campaign against Narva (1256–1257) Location: Unknown	Sweden: Tavastians; Finns; "Didman"	Novgorod	Neither side achieved much success
The war against Valdemar Birgersson (1275): Battle of Hova	Valdemar's Forces	Duke Magnus's Forces	Valdemar, King of Sweden is deposed Magnus Ladulås is crowned king of Sweden.
6000 mark war (1276–1278)	Sweden	Denmark	Danish victory: Sweden agrees to pay a reduced amount of 4000 marks to Denmark.
Third Folkung Uprising (1278–1280) Location: Sweden	Sweden	Folkung	Victory of the Swedish king: Insurgents captured; One of the leaders is fined while two others are executed.
Ladoga Campaign (1283–1284) Location: Unknown	Sweden	Novgorod	Indecisive
War in Gotland (1288) Location: Gotland	Visby	Gotland	Victory for Visby
Swedish campaign against the Karelians and Izhorians (1292) Location: Unknown	Sweden	Karelians; Izhorians	Swedish defeat
Third Swedish Crusade (1293–1295) Location: Finland	Sweden	Karelians; Novgorod republic	Swedish victory: Swedish border expands eastwards
Neva Campaign (1300–1301) Location: Neva river	Sweden	Novgorod	Landskrona captured by Novgorod
Swedish Brother's Feud (1304–1310) Location: Sweden	Birger Magnusson	Duke Eric and Valdemar	Victory for Birger Magnusson, death of Valdemar and Duke Eric
War on Gotland (1313) Location: Gotland	Sweden	Gotland	Gutes agree to pay an increased tax to the Swedish king.
Tavastian war (1311–1314) Location: Tavastia	Sweden	Novgorod Republic	Indecisive
Uprisings in Hälsingland and Småland (1316–1317) Location: Unknown	Sweden	Rebels in Hälsingland and Småland	Insurgents lose their property after a verdict by King Birger
Attack on Åbo (1318) Location: Åbo	Sweden	Novgorod Republic	Novgorodians burn the outskirts of Åbo
War of Deposition against Birger Magnusson (1317–1319) Location: Sweden	Birger Magnusson	Insurgents loyal to the Dukes Valdemar and Erik	Birger is deposed
Kexholm war (1321–1323) Location: Unknown	Sweden	Novgorod	Treaty of Nöteborg
Swedish–Novgorodian Wars (1142–1323) Location: Finland	Sweden (Kingdom of Norway (872–1397)) Norway (1319–1323)	Novgorod Republic	Treaty of Nöteborg (1323)
Campaign against Ingeborg (1323) Location: Sweden	Swedish–Norwegian Union	Ingeborg of Norway	Peace of Skara: Ingeborg is forced to exchange Axvall for the unfortified Dåvö in Västmanland
Mats Kettilmundssons war against Reval (1325–1326) Location: Unknown	Swedish–Norwegian Union (Mats Kettilmundsson)	Reval	Mats Kettilmundsson dies before any confrontations take place, peace signed in 31 May 1326
Sten bielkes war against Novgorod (1338–1339) Location: Novgorod	Swedish–Norwegian Union	Novgorod	Peace signed in either August or September 1339.: Novgorodian strategic failure
Johan Offessons Uprising (1339) Location: Sweden	Swedish–Norwegian Union	Johan Offesson	Lindholm Castle is destroyed, and Johan is forced to give Skytts and Oxie to the king
Kalundborg War (1341–1343) Location: Sweden	Swedish–Norwegian Union Holstein	Denmark Lübeck; Rostock; Hamburg; Stralsund; Wismar; Greifswald	Swedish-Norwegian victory: Valdemar IV admits his sale of Scania, Blekinge, and Halland to Sweden-Norway; Copenhagen Castle is given back to Denmark
Saint George's Night Uprising (1343–1345) Location: Unknown	Swedish–Norwegian Union; Estonians	Denmark; Teutonic Order	Indecisive: Swedish-Norwegian troops plunder Reval; Estonian uprising crushed
Magnus's war against Russia (1348–1351) Location: Unknown	Swedish–Norwegian Union	Novgorod	Truce of Dorprat: Swedish-Norwegian success in the beginning; Swedish-Norwegian failure to keep Nöteborg
Campaign between Magnus and his son (1356–1359) Location: Unknown	Magnus IV	Eric	According to the arbitration in Jönköping, Sweden is divided between Magnus and Erik, this ends after Eric's death in 1359
Valdemar Atterdags reconquest of Scania (1360) Location: Scania	Swedish–Norwegian Union	Denmark	Denmark conquers all of Scania
Valdemar Atterdags conquest of Gotland (1361) Location: Gotland	Swedish–Norwegian Union	Denmark	Denmark conquers Gotland
Danish–Hanseatic War (1361–1370) Location: Northern Germany, Scandinavia, and the Baltic Sea	First phase (1361–1365): Hanseatic League; Gotland; Lubeck; Stralsund; Kingdom of Norway; Kingdom of Sweden; Second phase (1367–1370): Confederation of Cologne; Towns in Holland; Towns in Zeeland; Hanseatic League; Towns in Prussia; Towns in Livonia; Lubeck; Stralsund; Rostock; Teutonic Order; Kingdom of Sweden; County of Holstein; Duchy of Mecklenburg; Danish Noble Rebels	First phase (1361–1365) Kingdom of Denmark Second phase (1367–1370) Kingdom of Denmark Kingdom of Norway	First phase: Danish victory Second phase: Hanseatic victory Hanseatic League gains control over several forts in Scania
War of deposition against Magnus (1363–1371) Location: Unknown	Magnus IV Haakon VI	Albert of Mecklenburg	Albert becomes king of Sweden
Swedish involvement in the Danish war of succession (1379–1381) Location: Unknown	Sweden	Denmark	Truce signed in 1381
Invasion of Scania (1384) Location: Unknown	Sweden	Denmark	Truce likely signed in 1384: Temporary capture of Laholm by Sweden, followed by subsequent retreat
War of deposition against Albrekt of Mecklenburg (1388–1395)	Sweden	Denmark	Margaret I becomes regent
Attack on Jama (1395)	Sweden; Kalmar Union	Novgorod Republic	Indecisive
Northern Ladoga Campaign (1396)	Sweden; Kalmar Union	Novgorod Republic	Indecisive

== Union of Kalmar (1397–1521) ==
Conflict	Sweden and its allies	Sweden's opposition	Outcome
Campaign against the Victual Brothers (1395–1398)	Sweden; Kalmar Union	Victual Brothers	The Victual Brothers surrender their fortresses in Sweden
War in Gotland (1398)	Sweden; Kalmar Union	(State of the Teutonic Order) Teutonic Order	Gotland is conquered by the Teutonic Order
Campaign against Knut Bosson Grip (1398)	Sweden; Kalmar Union	Knut Bosson Grip	Grip surrenders his Finnish fortresses to the crown.
Novgorod's attack in the north (1399) Location: Unknown	Sweden; Kalmar Union	Novgorodian Republic	Indecisive
War in Gotland (1403–1404) Location: Unknown	Sweden; Kalmar Union	Teutonic Order	Teutonic victory
Engelbrekt rebellion (1434–1436)	Sweden	Kalmar Union	Swedish victory
Pukefejden (1436–1437)	Charles VIII of Sweden	Erik Puke	Erik Puke is executed
War against the Flemingar (1437)	Sweden	Flemingar	Indecisive
Rebellion in Östergötaland (1437) Location: Östergötland	Sweden	Rebels in Östergötaland	Uprising crushed
Värmland rebellion (1437–1438) Location: Värmland	Sweden	Rebels in Värmland	Uprising crushed
David's Rebellion (1438–1439)	Sweden	Tavastian insurgents	Uprising quelled
Karl Knutssons campaign against Eric of Pomerania (1439–1440)	Sweden	Eric of Pomerania	The remaining fortresses loyal to Eric fall
Karl Knutssons campaign against Novgorod (1444)	Sweden	Novgorodian Republic	Swedish victory
War in Gotland (1446)	Sweden; Kalmar Union	Eric of Pomerania	Indecisive
Novgorods war against Karl Knutsson (1448)	Sweden	Novgorodian Republic	Indecisive
War on Gotland (1448–1449)	Sweden	Eric of Pomerania; Denmark	Swedish failure
War for Norway (1448–1451)	Sweden	Denmark	Danish victory
Karl Knutssons war against Denmark (1449–1457)	Sweden	Denmark	Christian I fails to retake the Swedish throne
War of Deposition against Karl Knutsson (1457)	Sweden	Jöns Bengtsson Oxenstierna	Christian I becomes King of Sweden
Battle of Haraker (1464)	Sweden	Denmark	Karl Knutsson regains the throne
Second War of deposition against Karl Knutsson (1464–1465)	Sweden	Jöns Bengtsson Oxenstierna	Jöns Bengtsson takes power
War of deposition against Jöns Bengtsson Oxenstierna (1466–1467) Location: Sweden	Sweden	Jöns Bengtsson Oxenstierna; Denmark	Karl Knutsson retakes the throne
Dano-Swedish War (1468–1469) Location: Sweden	Sweden	Denmark	Christian I fails to retake the throne
Erik Karlsson Vasa's Uprising (1469–1470) Location: Sweden	Sweden	Erik Karlsson Vasa	Uprising crushed
Dano-Swedish War (1469–1470) Location: Sweden	Sweden	Denmark	Christian I fails to retake the throne
Dano-Swedish War (1470–1471) (1470–1471) Location: Sweden	Sweden	Denmark	Swedish Victory
First campaign to Livonia (1473–1475) Location: Unknown	Sweden	Teutonic Order	Indecisive
Tott's first Russian war (1475―1476) Location: Finland	Sweden	Grand Duchy of Moscow	Truce in December 1475 or early 1476
Second campaign to Livonia (1478) Location: Unknown	Sweden	Teutonic Order	Indecisive: Swedish military failure
Tott's second Russian war (1479–1482) Location: Finland	Sweden	Grand Duchy of Moscow	Truce in Novgorod 17 January 1482: Russian raids around Nyslott; Swedish raids 120 km into Russian territory.
Third campaign to Livonia (1485–1486/1488) Location: Unknown	Sweden	Teutonic Order	Indecisive, peace signed in 1488.
Sten Sture's war against the Totts (1487) Location: Sweden	Sweden	Tott	Tott family's power is reduced Gotland falls into Danish control
Russo-Swedish War (1495–1497) (1495–1497) Location: Sweden	Sweden	Grand Duchy of Moscow	Swedish victory
Battle of Rotebro (1497)	Sweden	Denmark	Danish victory: King John becomes king of Sweden
Border conflict at Nyslott (1499) Location: Nyslott	Sweden	Grand Duchy of Moscow	Swedish Victory: Russian attacks repelled
War of Deposition against King Hans (1501–1503) Location: Sweden	Sweden	Denmark	Swedish Victory: King Hans deposed as king of Sweden
Dano-Swedish War (1501–1512) (1501–1512) Location: Sweden	Sweden; Norwegian rebels (1501–1504); Free City of Lübeck (1509–12)	Kalmar Union: Denmark; Norway	Treaty of Malmö: Sweden and Lübeck agree to pay contribution to Denmark; Sweden preserves its independence
Dano-Swedish War (1512–1520) (1512–1520) Location: Sweden	Sweden	Kalmar Union: Denmark; Norway	Surrender of Stockholm: Kristian II is elected King of Sweden and the Kalmar Union temporarily resurrected; Stockholm Bloodbath
Swedish War of Liberation (1521–23) Location: Scandinavia	Sweden; Free City of Lübeck (from 1522)	Kalmar Union: Denmark; Norway	Kingdom of Sweden proclaims independence

== Vasa era (1523–1611) ==
Conflict	Sweden and its allies	Sweden's opposition	Outcome
Count's Feud (May 1534 – 29 July 1536) Location: Denmark	Christian III (Protestants); Schleswig; Holstein; Sweden; Duchy of Prussia; Jutland; Funen; Supported by: Norwegian nobles Duchy of Guelders	Christian II (Catholics); County of Oldenburg; Free City of Lübeck; Scania; Malmö; Copenhagen; Zealand; Supported by: Norwegian nobles Habsburg Netherlands	Victory for Christian III and the Danish Protestants.
Möre uprising (1536) Location: Sweden	Sweden	Rebels led by Jon Andersson	Peasant uprising defeated
Dacke War (1542–1543) Location: Sweden	Sweden	Rebels led by Nils Dacke	Peasant uprising defeated
Lappvesi Peasant Revolt (1551–1553)	Sweden	Karelian insurgents	Uprising quelled
Russo-Swedish War (1554–1557) (1554–1557) Location: Sweden	Sweden	Tsardom of Russia	Disputed
Northern Seven Years' War (1563–1570) Location: Scandinavia	Sweden	Denmark–Norway; Free City of Lübeck; Polish–Lithuanian Union (Note: Polish–Lithuanian Commonwealth after July 1569.)	Swedish victory against Poland–Lithuania; Dano-Norwegian victory against Sweden
Livonian War (1558–1583) Location: Sweden	Livonian Confederation; Polish–Lithuanian Commonwealth (before 1569 the Polish–Lithuanian union); Denmark–Norway Kingdom of Sweden; Zaporozhian Cossacks; Principality of Transylvania (after 1577)	Tsardom of Russia; Qasim Khanate; Kingdom of Livonia	Treaty of Teusina: Estonia ceded to Sweden
Claus Kurssell's coup (1570–1571) Location: Reval (Tallinn)	Sweden; Supported by Reval	Mercenaries	Revolutionary failure
Russo-Swedish War (1590–1595) (1590–1595) Location: Sweden	Sweden	Tsardom of Russia	Swedish victory
Cudgel War (1596–1597) Location: Finland	Sweden	Finnish rebels	Nobility victory: Suppression of the uprising
War against Sigismund (1598–1599) Location: Sweden	Polish–Swedish union: Poland; Sweden	Swedish separatists	Separatist victory, Polish–Swedish Union dissolved
Polish–Swedish War (1600–1629) (1600–1629) Location: Baltic Sea, Prussia, Latvia, Poland	Sweden	Poland (Poland–Lithuania); Holy Roman Empire (1626–1629)	Truce of Altmark, Livonia ceded to Sweden
De la Gardie campaign (1609–1610) Location: Russia	Sweden; Tsardom of Russia	Polish–Lithuanian Commonwealth; False Dmitry II	Polish–Lithuanian Victory
Ingrian War (1610–1617) Location: Russia	Sweden Swedish Empire	Tsardom of Russia	Treaty of Stolbovo, Ingria ceded to Sweden
Kalmar War (1611–1613) Location: Scandinavia	Sweden Swedish Empire	Denmark–Norway	Treaty of Knäred, Dano-Norwegian victory

== Swedish Empire (1611–1721) ==
Conflict	Sweden and its allies	Sweden's opposition	Outcome	Casualties
Västbo peasant uprising (1616) Location: Småland	Sweden	(Småland) Peasants and knights	Uprising quelled	Unknown
Stockholm riots (1623) Location: Stockholm	Sweden	(Stockholm) Rioters	Riots quelled	Unknown
Jödde Stims uprising (1624) Location: Småland	Sweden	Småland rebels	Uprising crushed	Unknown
Dalecarlian uprising (1627) Location: Dalarna	Sweden	(Dalarna) Dalecarlian rebels	Uprising crushed	Unknown
Thirty Years' War (1618–1648) Location: Central Europe	Anti-Imperial alliance: prior to 1635 (Note: States that fought against the Emperor at some point between 1618 and 1635): Kingdom of Bohemia; Swedish Empire; Palatinate; (Duchy of Savoy) Savoy; Transylvania (Note: "into line with army of Gabriel Bethlen in 1620"); Dutch Republic; Denmark–Norway; Heilbronn League; Hesse-Kassel; Brandenburg-Prussia; Saxony; Post-1635 Peace of Prague: France; Swedish Empire; Dutch Republic; Hesse-Kassel	Imperial alliance prior to 1635 (Note: States that allied at some point between 1618 and 1635): Habsburg Monarchy; (Spain) Spanish Empire; Bavaria; Catholic League; Post-1635 Peace of Prague: Holy Roman Empire; (Spain) Spanish Empire; Denmark–Norway	Peace of Westphalia	110 000
Torstenson War (1643–1645) Location: Denmark–Norway, Swedish Empire	Swedish Empire; Dutch Republic	Denmark-Norway; Holy Roman Empire	Swedish/Dutch victory Second Treaty of Brömsebro (1645)	Unknown
Siege of Carolusborg (1652) Location: Cape Coast Castle	Swedish Empire	Dutch Republic	Swedish victory	Unknown
First Bremian War (1654) Location: Bremen	Swedish Empire	Bremen (1654)	First Stade Recess, Bremen pays homage to Sweden	Unknown
Capture of Fort Casimir (1654) Location: Delaware	Swedish Empire	Dutch Republic	Swedish victory	Unknown
Jämtland uprising (1655) Location: Jämtland	Swedish Empire	(Jämtland) Jämtlanders	Uprising crushed	Unknown
Conquest of New Sweden (1655) Location: New Sweden	Swedish Empire	Dutch Republic	Dutch victory	Unknown
Capture of Carolusborg (1658) Location: Carolusborg	Swedish Empire	Denmark-Norway; Dutch Gold Coast; Fetu Kingdom; Rebellious slaves	Dano-Norwegian victory	Entire garrison captured
Russo-Swedish War (1656–1658) Location: Livonia, Finland	Swedish Empire	(Tsardom of Russia) Russia	Swedish victory	Unknown
Second Northern War (1655–1660) Location: Denmark–Norway, Swedish Empire, Polish–Lithuanian Commonwealth, Swedish colonies in North America	Swedish Empire; Brandenburg-Prussia (1656–1657); Principality of Transylvania; Ukrainian Cossacks (1657); Grand Duchy of Lithuania; Wallachia; Moldavia	Poland (Poland-Lithuania); Denmark–Norway (1657–1660); Habsburg Monarchy; Moscow Tsardom (1656–58); Crimean Khanate; Brandenburg-Prussia (1655–1656, 1657–1660); Duchy of Courland (1656–1658); Dutch Republic	Swedish victory against Denmark–Norway; Dutch victory in North America; Swedish invasion of Poland–Lithuania unsuccessful	70 000
Second Bremian War (1666) Location: Bremen	Swedish Empire	Bremen (1654/66); Electorate of Cologne (1666); Brunswick-Lüneburg (Celle) (1666); Denmark–Norway (1666); Electorate of Brandenburg (1666); Dutch Republic (1666)	Treaty of Habenhausen, conflicting results	Unknown
War of Devolution (24 May 1667 – 2 May 1668) Location: Spanish Netherlands; Franche-Comté; Northern Catalonia	(Spain) Spanish Empire Triple Alliance: Dutch Republic; Kingdom of England; Swedish Empire	France	Treaty of Aix-la-Chapelle (1668): Armentières, Bergues, Charleroi, Kortrijk, Douai, Veurne, Lille, Oudenaarde and Tournai to France	Unknown
Franco-Dutch War (1672–1678) Location: Low Countries, Rhineland, Italy, France, North Sea, Catalonia, Mediterranean Sea, Atlantic Ocean, and East Indies	France; England (1672–74); Münster (1672–1674); Cologne (1672–1674); (Sweden) Swedish Empire (from 1674)	Dutch Republic; Holy Roman Empire (from 1673); Spain (from 1673); Brandenburg-Prussia (from 1673); Lorraine (from 1673); Denmark–Norway (from 1674); England (1678)	Treaties of Nijmegen	Unknown
Scanian War (1675–1679) Location: Scandinavia, Europe	Swedish Empire; Kingdom of France	Denmark–Norway; Dutch Republic; Brandenburg-Prussia; Holy Roman Empire	Treaty of Fontainebleau (1679); Treaty of Lund (1679); Treaty of Saint-Germain-en-Laye (1679): Sweden restores their territories in Pomerania	Heavy
Siege of Hamburg (1686) Location: Hamburg	Swedish Empire; Hamburg; Brandenburg-Prussia; Holy Roman Empire	Denmark–Norway; Kingdom of France	Siege lifted: Danish withdrawal; Hamburg pays 300,000 thalers in compensation to Denmark	Heavy
Great Northern War (22 February 1700 – 10 September 1721) Location: Northern Europe; Central Europe; Eastern Europe	Swedish Empire; Holstein-Gottorp (1700–1720); Warsaw Confederation (1704–1709); Ottoman Empire (1710–14); Crimean Khanate (1710–1714); Wallachia (1710–1714); Cossack Hetmanate (1708–1714); Dutch Republic (1700); England (1700); Scotland (1700); Ireland (1700); (Kingdom of Great Britain) Great Britain (1719–1720)	Tsardom of Russia; Cossack Hetmanate; Kalmyk Khanate; (Electorate of Saxony) Saxony (1700–1706, 1709–1719); Duchy of Courland (1700–1701); Polish–Lithuanian Commonwealth (1701–1704, 1709–1719); Sandomierz Confederation (1704–1709); Denmark–Norway (1700, 1709–1720); (Kingdom of Prussia) Prussia (1715–1720); (Electorate of Brunswick-Lüneburg) Hanover (1715–1719); (Kingdom of Great Britain) Great Britain (1717–1719); Montenegro (1711–1712); Moldavia (1711)	Coalition victory: Treaty of Nystad; Treaties of Stockholm; Treaty of Frederiksborg; Treaty of the Pruth	200,000

== Age of Liberty (1718–1772) ==
Conflict	Sweden and its allies	Sweden's opposition	Outcome	Casualties
Russo-Swedish War (1741–1743) (Part of the War of the Austrian Succession) Location: Finland, Russia	Sweden	Russian Empire	Russian victory: Treaty of Turku	7000
Dalecarlian rebellion (1743) (1743) Location: Sweden	Sweden	Dalecarlian rebels	Rebellion crushed	+150
Expedition to the Mediterranean (1759–1760) Location: Mediterranean Sea	Sweden	Pirates	Successful expedition	None
Pomeranian War (13 September 1757 – 22 May 1762) Location: Swedish Pomerania, Prussian Pomerania, Brandenburg, Mecklenburg-Schwerin	Sweden; Russian Empire	(Kingdom of Prussia) Prussia	Prussian victory Status quo ante bellum	A couple thousands
Tunis-Swedish War (1763) Location: Mediterranean	Sweden	Tunis; Ottoman Empire (De-jure)	Inconclusive	Unknown

== Gustavian era (1772–1809) ==
Conflict	Sweden and its allies	Sweden's opposition	Outcome	Casualties
Battle of Ibiza (28–29 February 1780) Location: coast of Ibiza	Swedish Navy	(United Kingdom of Great Britain and Ireland) United Kingdom	Swedish victory	3
Theatre War; 1788–1789 Location: Sweden	Sweden Supported by: (United Kingdom of Great Britain and Ireland) United Kingdom; Prussia	Denmark–Norway	Status quo ante bellum: Swedish political and diplomatic victory; Danish military victory	5
Russo-Swedish War (1788–1790) Location: Finland, Baltic Sea, Sweden	Sweden	Russian Empire; Denmark–Norway (1788–1789)	Favourable outcome for Sweden; Status quo ante bellum	3000
Swedish–Algerian war of 1791–1792 (1791–1792) Location: Mediterranean	Sweden	Regency of Algiers; Ottoman Empire (De-jure)	Sweden agrees to pay tribute	Unknown
First Barbary War (10 May 1801 – 10 June 1805) Location: Off the Mediterranean coast of Tripoli; Derna	United States; Sweden (1801–1802); Sicily	Tripolitania Morocco (1802); Ottoman Empire (De-jure)	Peace Treaty	Unknown
Franco-Swedish War (31 October 1805 – 6 January 1810) Location: Swedish Pomerania	Sweden; (United Kingdom of Great Britain and Ireland) United Kingdom; (Kingdom of Prussia) Prussia; Co-belligerents: Russian Empire (–1807); Austrian Empire; Saxony	(First French Empire) French Empire; Spain; Holland; Co-belligerents: Russian Empire (1808–1809); Denmark–Norway (1808–1809)	French victory: Treaty of Paris	+6000
Finnish War (21 February 1808 – 17 September 1809) Location: Scandinavia	Sweden; Supported by: (United Kingdom of Great Britain and Ireland) United Kingdom	Russian Empire; Co-belligerent: Denmark–Norway (The Dano-Swedish War); Supported by: (First French Empire) French Empire	Russian victory: Treaty of Fredrikshamn	7000
Dano-Swedish War of 1808–1809 (1808–1809) Location: Scandinavia	Sweden; Co-belligerent: (United Kingdom of Great Britain and Ireland) United Kingdom (Gunboat War)	Denmark–Norway; Co-belligerent: Russian Empire (Finnish War); Supported by: (First French Empire) French Empire	Status quo ante bellum	~200

== Kingdom of Sweden (1809–present) ==
Conflict	Sweden and its allies	Sweden's opposition	Outcome	Casualties
Saint-Barthélemy Mutiny (1810) Location: Saint Barthélemy	Sweden	Mutineers	Mutinist victory	Unknown
Anglo-Swedish War (1810–1812) Location: N/A	Sweden	United Kingdom	Status quo ante bellum	None
Dano-Swedish War (1813–1814) Location: Duchy of Schleswig, Duchy of Holstein	Sweden; Russian Empire; Hanover; United Kingdom	Denmark-Norway	Coalition victory: Denmark cedes Norway to Sweden; Sweden cedes Swedish Pomerania to Denmark	Unknown
War of the Sixth Coalition (3 March 1813 – 30 May 1814) Location: Central and Eastern Europe, France, Italy	Original coalition: Russia; Prussia; United Kingdom; Mecklenburg-Schwerin; Portugal; Sardinia; Sicily; Spain; Sweden; After the Armistice of Pläswitz: Austria; Bavaria; After the Battle of Leipzig: Baden; Liechtenstein; Netherlands; Württemberg; After January 1814 Denmark	France: Duchy of Warsaw (Note: Duchy of Warsaw as a state was in effect fully occupied by Russian and Prussian forces by May 1813, although most Poles remained loyal to Napoleon.); Italy; Naples; Until January 1814: Confederation of the Rhine (many member states defected after the Battle of Leipzig); Denmark–Norway	Coalition victory	Unknown
Swedish–Norwegian War (1814) Location: Norway	Sweden; Supported by: United Kingdom (naval blockade)	Norway	Swedish victory: Convention of Moss	400
Saint-Barthélemy affair (1821)	Sweden–Norway	Pirates France	Victory	None
Invasion of Åland (1918) Location: Åland	Central Powers: (German Empire) Germany Sweden	Soviet Russia	Åland Islands dispute	1
Congo Crisis; 5 July 1960 – 25 November 1965 Location: Republic of the Congo	1960–1963: (Democratic Republic of the Congo) Congo-Léopoldville; Supported by: Soviet Union (1960) (United Nations) ONUC: India; Sweden; Ireland; Ethiopia; Canada; Malaya; UAS; Nigeria; Argentina; Australia; Brazil; Burma; Norway; Denmark; Ceylon; Indonesia; Iran; Philippines; Italy; Liberia; Morocco; Tunisia; Netherlands; Pakistan; Sierra Leone; Sudan; United Arab Republic; Yugoslavia; 1964–1965: (Democratic Republic of the Congo) Congo-Léopoldville; United States; Belgium; Supported by: (United Nations) ONUC (1964)	1960–1963: Katanga; South Kasai Supported by: (Note: None of the supporters ever officially recognised either of the two states.): Belgium; South Africa; France; Portugal; CAF; 1960–1962: (Democratic Republic of the Congo) Congo-Stanleyville; Supported by: Soviet Union 1964–1965: Kwilu and Simba rebels Supported by: Soviet Union; China; Cuba	Victory	19
Gulf War (1990–1991) Location: Iraq; Kuwait; Saudi Arabia; Persian Gulf; Israel	United States; United Kingdom; France; Saudi Arabia; Egypt; Kuwait; Coalition: Sweden	Iraq	Allied victory	None
Operation Deliberate Force (30 August – 20 September 1995) Location: Bosnia and Herzegovina	NATO: France; Germany; Italy; Netherlands; Spain; Turkey; United Kingdom; United States; (United Nations) UNPROFOR (Sweden was a part of UNPROFOR)	Republika Srpska	Strategic NATO victory: Bosnian Serbs return to negotiations	6 (in accidents)
War in Afghanistan (2001–2021) Location: Afghanistan	ISAF/RS phase (from 2001): Islamic Republic of Afghanistan ISAF (2001–2015): United States; United Kingdom; Canada; Australia; Italy; Germany; Georgia; Jordan; Turkey; Bulgaria; Poland; Romania; Spain; Czech Republic; North Macedonia; Denmark; Armenia; Azerbaijan; Finland; France; Croatia; Hungary; Norway; Lithuania; Mongolia; UAE; Belgium; Portugal; Slovakia; Netherlands; Montenegro; Latvia; Sweden; Albania; Ukraine; Bosnia and Herzegovina; Greece; Ireland; Iceland; Estonia; Malaysia; Slovenia; Austria; Switzerland; Bahrain; El Salvador; Luxembourg; New Zealand; South Korea; Tonga; Singapore; Resolute Support (from 2015)	ISAF/RS phase (from 2001): (Afghanistan) Taliban: Islamic Jihad Union; Haqqani network (from 2002); al-Qaeda (al-Qaeda in the Indian Subcontinent (AQIS)) (Afghanistan) Taliban splinter groups: Fidai Mahaz (from 2013); Mullah Dadullah Front (from 2012); IEHCA loyal to Muhammad Rasul (from 2015); Supported by: Hezb-e-Islami Gulbuddin (until 2016); Islamic Jihad Union (from 2002); Islamic Movement of Uzbekistan (until 2015); Turkistan Islamic Party; Lashkar-e-Jhangvi; Pakistani Taliban; Lashkar-e-Islam; Iran (allegedly); Russia (allegedly); Pakistan (allegedly); Saudi Arabia (allegedly); China (allegedly) RS phase (from 2015): ISIL–KP; IMU	Defeat: Taliban takeover of Afghanistan	5
First Libyan Civil War Location: Libya	Anti-Gaddafi forces: National Liberation Army; National Transitional Council; Islamic Fighting Group; Anti-Gaddafi tribes; Foreign mercenaries (alleged); Qatar Enforcing UNSC Resolution 1973: NATO; NATO members: Belgium; Bulgaria; Canada; Denmark; France; Italy; Netherlands; Norway; Portugal; Romania; Spain; Turkey; United Kingdom; United States; Other countries: Jordan; Sweden; United Arab Emirates; Minor border clashes: Tunisia Arms suppliers: Egypt; Moldova; Switzerland	Libyan Jamahiriya: Libyan Armed Forces; Paramilitary forces; Pro-Gaddafi tribes; Foreign mercenaries (alleged)	Rebel victory	None
Mali War (16 January 2012 – Present) Location: Northern Mali	Government of Mali: Military of Mali; France; ECOWAS Full list: Benin; Burkina Faso; Cape Verde; Gambia; Ghana; Guinea; Guinea-Bissau; Ivory Coast; Liberia; Niger; Nigeria; Sierra Leone; Senegal; Togo; Chad; Burundi; Gabon; South Africa; Rwanda; Tanzania; Uganda; China; Germany; Sweden; Estonia; Egypt; United Kingdom Supported by: Full list: Algeria; Angola; Australia; Bangladesh; Belgium; Bulgaria; Cambodia; Canada; Comoros; Czech Republic; Denmark; European Union; Germany; Hungary; India; Ireland; Italy; Japan; Mauritania; Morocco; Namibia; Nepal; Netherlands; Norway; Poland; Portugal; Romania; Spain; Turkey; Ukraine; United Arab Emirates; United Kingdom; United States; Non-state combatants: Ganda Iso; FLNA; MSA (from 2016); GATIA (from 2014)	* National Movement for the Liberation of Azawad (MNLA): Islamic Movement of Azawad (MIA) Al-Qaeda; Jama'at Nasr al-Islam wal Muslimin (2017–present); Al-Mourabitoun (2013–17); Ansar al-Sharia (2012–present); Ansar Dine (2012–17); AQIM (2012–17); Macina Liberation Front (2015–17); MOJWA (2011–13); Nigerian jihadist volunteers: Boko Haram (2012–13); Ansaru (2012–13); Islamic State: Islamic State in the Greater Sahara	Withdrawal in 2023	None

== See also ==
- List of Swedish peacekeeping missions
- Realm of Sweden
- Dominions of Sweden
- List of Swedish monarchs
- List of Swedish military commanders
- List of Swedish field marshals
- List of Swedish regiments
