= 14th century in Norway =

- Other decades
- 12th | 13th | 14th | 15th | 16th

Events from the 14th century in Norway.

== 1301–1309 ==
1301

- False Margaret was burned at the stake for treason at Nordnes in Bergen. She impersonated Margaret, Maid of Norway.

1302

- 2 December – Death of Audun Hugleiksson, baron (born c.1240).

== 1310s ==
1312

- 1 May – Death of Euphemia of Rügen, Queen consort (born c.1280).
- 29 October – The Treaty of Inverness between Robert the Bruce of Scotland and Haakon V of Norway reaffirmed the Treaty of Perth (1266). Bruce personally represented Scotland at Inverness.
- Ingeborg of Norway and Eric Magnusson were married in a double wedding in Oslo; at the same time, her cousin Ingeborg Eriksdottir of Norway, married Eric's brother duke Valdemar Magnusson.

1316

- The Great Famine of 1315–1317.
- Birth of Magnus IV of Sweden, King (d. 1374).

1319

- 8 May – King Haakon V dies and the House of Sverre is replaced by the House of Bjälbo as the ruling house of Norway.
- 8 July – Three-year-old Magnus Eriksson is elected king of Sweden, thus establishing a union with Norway. His mother Ingeborg of Norway is given a place in the regency, in both Sweden and Norway.

== 1320s ==
1323

- 20 February – The Norwegian regency council rebelled against Ingeborg of Norway.

1326

- 3 June – The Treaty of Novgorod marked an end of long-lasting border skirmishes in the region of Finnmark, between Norway and the Republic of Novgorod.

== 1330s ==
1331

- The First Norwegian Noble Rising starts.

1333

- The First Norwegian Noble Rising ends. The Norwegian Royal Seal is given to the Norwegian nobels and Ivar Ogmundsson is appointed as Royal Seal holder.

1335

- Marriage between King Magnus VII and Blanche of Namur.

1338

- The Second Norwegian Noble Rising starts.

1339

- The Second Norwegian Noble Rising ends.

== 1340s ==
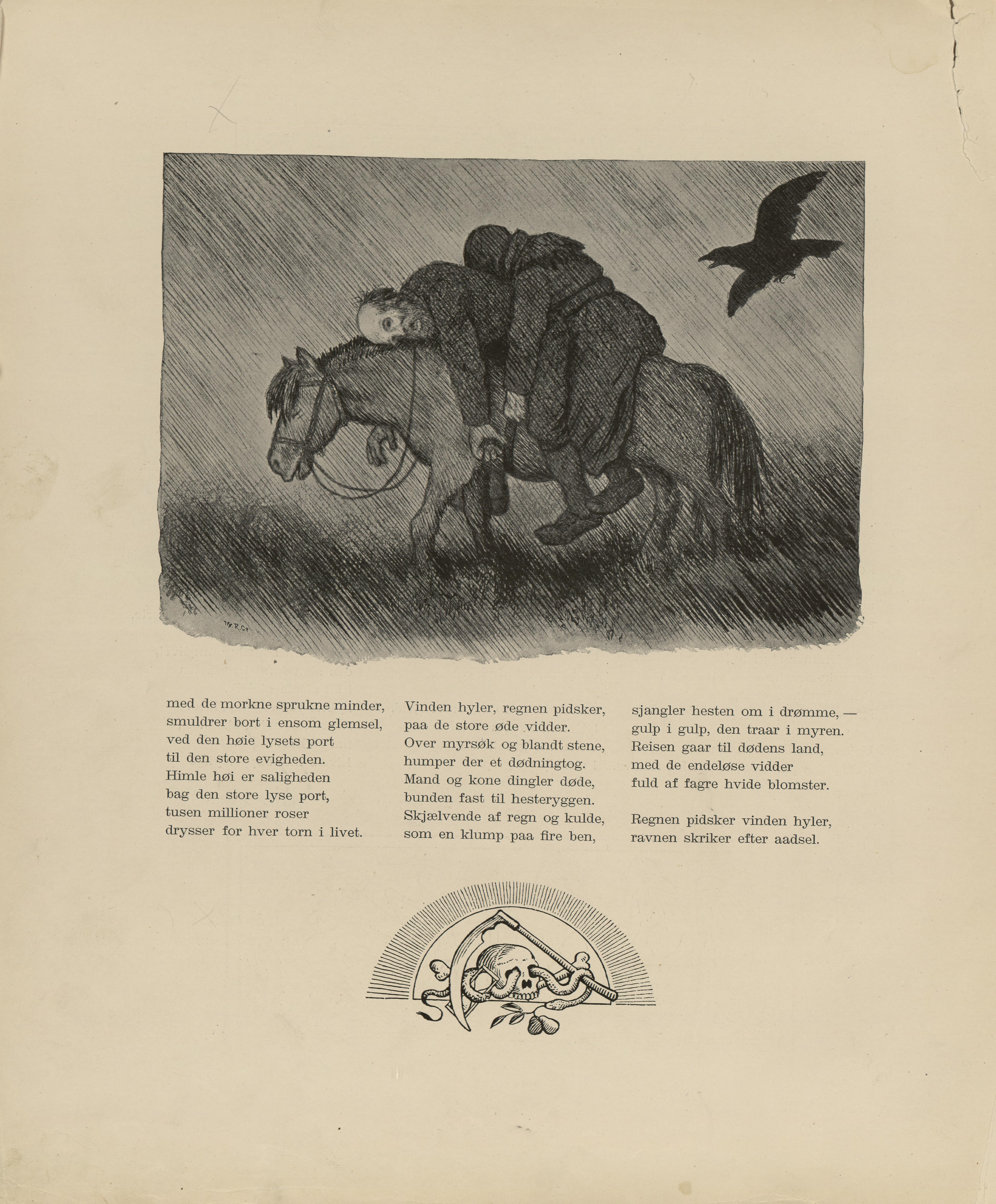
From Theodor Kittelsen's book Svartedauen

1343

- King Haakon VI Magnusson was elected King of Norway, and his father Magnus Eriksson was acting as his guardian until 1355.

1349

- The devastating pandemic named Black Death reached Norway. It is estimated that roughly 60% of the population in Norway died from the pest.
- After 17 October – Death of Arne Einarsson Vade, Archbishop of Nidaros (born c. 1300).

== 1350s ==
1355

- King Haakon VI came of age, ending the regency of King Magnus VII and the First Swedish–Norwegian union.
- Death of Erling Vidkunsson, nobleman and regent of Norway (born 1293)

1358

- The town of Skien is founded.
- Death of Isabel Bruce, Queen consort (born c. 1272 in Scotland).

== 1360s ==
1362

- February 15 – Haakon VI of Norway becomes King of Sweden, thus establishing a short lived personal union between Norway and Sweden.

1363

- April 9 – Haakon VI of Norway marries Margaret I of Denmark.
- Death of Blanche of Namur, queen-consort (born c.1320).
- Death of Herdis Torvaldsdatter, landowner (born c.1310).

1364

- February 18 – Albert of Mecklenburg becomes King of Sweden, thus ending the short lived personal union between Norway and Sweden.

== 1370s ==
1370

- Birth of Olav IV of Norway, king (died 1387).

1374

- 1 December – The former King Magnus VII of Norway drowned in a shipwreck at Lyngholmen in Bømlafjorden.

== 1380s ==
1380

- 29 July – Olav IV becomes King of Norway, following the death of his father, Haakon VI. Denmark and Norway were thus united in a personal union. This is regarded as the start of the 400 Years of Darkness in Norway.
- Death of Haakon VI of Norway, king (born 1340).

1387

- 3 August – The king Olav IV dies, and his mother Margaret I becomes the Queen of Norway.

1389

- 8 September – Eric III becomes king of Norway.

== 1390–1400 ==
1393

- Sacking of Bergen by the Victual Brothers. The Munkeliv Abbey at Nordnes suffered great damage from the attack.

1397

- 17 June – The Kalmar Union is formed, a personal union between Norway, Denmark and Sweden.
