= List of peacekeeping missions involving Sweden =

Sweden has had a long history of peacekeeping missions dating back to the late-1400s during the Swedish campaign to Livonia. Sweden is also a frequent participant in UN-peacekeeping missions and has proven to be a reliable ally of the United Nations.

Mission	Sweden and other participants	Mission	Result
Swedish campaign to Livonia (1485–1486)	Sweden; Reval	Restore peace between Reval and the Teutonic Order	Success: Peace signed in Reval in 1488
Swedish auxiliary corps to Flensburg (1849–1850)	Sweden-Norway; Denmark	Prevent fighting between Denmark and Prussia	Success: Peace restored between Denmark and Prussia
Swedish volunteers in Persia (1911–1916)	Sweden; Persia	Quell regional uprisings	Withdrawal: Creation of the Iranian Gendarmerie; The Swedish government decided to withdraw their soldiers due to pressure from the Allies
1935 Saar status referendum (1934–1935)	Sweden; France	Prevent violence from occurring	Success
United Nations Emergency Force (1956–1967)	United Nations: Sweden	Prevent further engagements between Israel and Egypt	Withdrawal: Six-Day War
Congo Crisis (1960–1965)	(Democratic Republic of the Congo) Congo-Léopoldville; United Nations: Sweden	Suppress regional uprisings and restore order	Success: Katangesee rebellion crushed
United Nations Peacekeeping Force in Cyprus (1964–)	United Nations: Sweden	Prevent further engagements between Greek Cypriots and Turkish Cypriots	Ongoing
United Nations Emergency Force II (1973–1979)	United Nations: Sweden	Prevent further engagements between Israel and Egypt	Success: End of the Yom kippur war
Gulf War (1991)	Sweden; United States of America; Saudi Arabia; Kuwait	Take down Saddam Hussein from power	Success
United Nations Mission for the Referendum in Western Sahara (1991–)	Western Sahara; United Nations: Sweden	Conduct a referendum in accordance with the Settlement Plan	Ongoing
United Nations Operation in Somalia II (1993–1995)	United Nations: Sweden	Intervene in Somalia	Defeat
Operation Deliberate Force (1995)	United Nations: Sweden	Undermine the military capability of the Army of Republika Srpska	Success
MONUSCO (1999–) Includes: Ituri conflict; Kivu conflict; Dongo conflict	Democratic Republic of the Congo; United Nations: Sweden	Restore peace to the Democratic Republic of the Congo	Ongoing
War in Afghanistan (2001-2021)	Islamic Republic of Afghanistan; Sweden	Prevent a Taliban takeover of Afghanistan	Defeat: Taliban takeover of Afghanistan
European Union Military Operation in Chad and the Central African Republic (2008–2009)	Chad; European Union: Sweden	Protect civilians	Withdrawal
First Libyan Civil War (2011)	Sweden; Anti-Gaddafi forces NATO	Establish a no-fly zone	Success: No-fly zone established
Mali War (2012–)	France; Mali United Nations: Sweden	Stabilize the northern regions of Mali	Withdrawal
War against the Islamic State (2014-)	Sweden; United States of America	Put down terrorism	Ongoing

== See also ==
- List of Swedish military commanders
- List of Swedish field marshals
- List of Swedish regiments
- List of wars involving Sweden
- List of Canadian peacekeeping missions
