= 13th century in Norway =

- Other decades
- 11th | 12th | 13th | 14th | 15th

Events from the 13th century in Norway.

== 1201–1209 ==
1202

- 25 January – The siege of Tønsberg Fortress ends. The commander of the fort Reidar Sendemann and his men surrenders to King Sverre of Norway.
- 9 March – Death of Sverre of Norway, King (born c. 1145/1151 ).
- Death of Inge Magnusson, pretender to the Norwegian throne (born c. 1182).

1204

- 1 January – Death of Haakon III of Norway, king (assumed born 1170s).
- 11 August – Death of Guttorm of Norway, king (child ruler) (born c. 1200).
- After the death of King Haakon III, his stepmother Queen Margaret was suspected of poisoning the king. One of her men had to undergo a trial by ordeal on her behalf to prove her innocence, but the man was badly burned. The servant was drowned and Margareta fled to Sweden.
- Birth of Haakon IV of Norway, king (died 1263).

1207

- Death of Erling Steinvegg, candidate of the Bagler to the Norwegian throne.

1209

- Marriage between Princess Christina of Norway and Philip Simonsson.
- Death of Margrete Eriksdotter, queen consort of Norway (born c. 1155).

== 1210s ==
1213

- Death of Christina of Norway, Queen consort, daughter of Sverre Sigurdsson, spouse of Philip Simonsson.

1214

- King Inge II suppressed a rising by the farmers in Trøndelag.
- Death of Haakon the Crazy, earl.

1217

- 23 April – Death of Inge II of Norway, king (born 1185).
- June – Haakon Haakonson becomes King of Norway as Haakon IV.
- Death of Philip Simonsson, pretender to the throne.

== 1220s ==
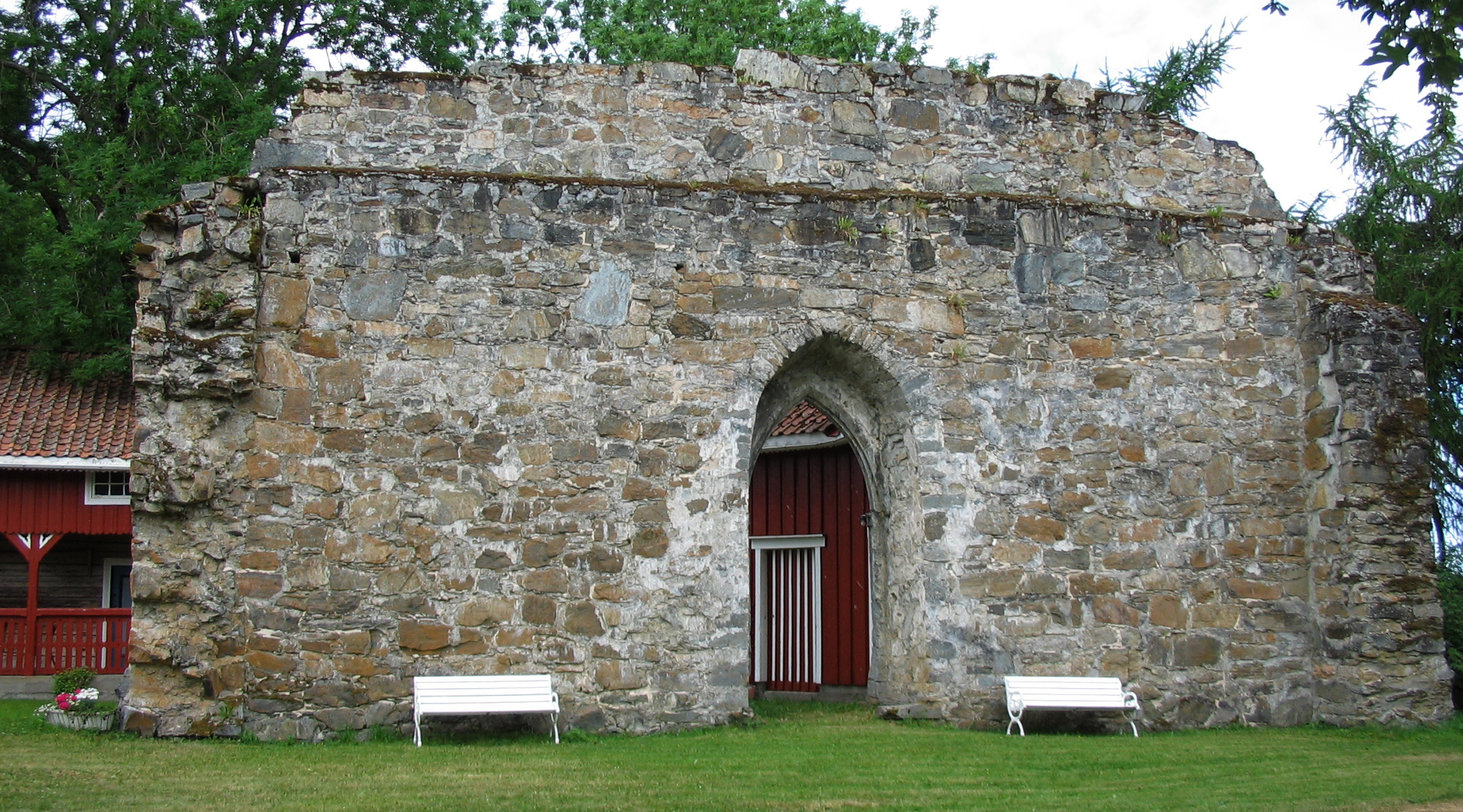
Rein Abbey ruins

1225

- 25 May – Margaret Skulesdatter married King Haakon IV.
- 7 November – Death of Nicholas Arnesson, bishop (born c. 1150).
- King Haakon IV led a large army into the Värmland district of Sweden, to punish the inhabitants for their support of the pretender to the throne of Norway, Sigurd Ribbung.

1226

- Rein Abbey was founded.
- Death of Sigurd Ribbung, nobleman and pretender to the throne (born 1203).

== 1230s ==
1232

- 10 November – Birth of Haakon the Young, (Junior) King (died 1257).

1234

- Birth of Christina of Norway, Infanta of Castile (died 1262).
- Death of Inga of Varteig, mother of king Haakon IV of Norway (born c. 1185)

1238

- Birth of Magnus VI of Norway, king (died 1280).

== 1240s ==
1240

- 1 April – Haakon the Young was hailed as king and co-ruler of Norway, in Nidaros.
- 12 April – Haakon the Young was hailed as king and co-ruler of Norway, in Bergen.
- 24 May – The civil war era in Norway ends, after Elgeseter Priory is burned down and Duke Skule Bårdsson was killed.
- 15 July – Norwegian troops fought in the Battle of the Neva.
- Birth of Audun Hugleiksson, nobleman (died 1302).

== 1250s ==
1257

- 3 May – Death of Haakon the Young, (Junior) King (born 1232).
- A peace agreement was made between Christopher I of Denmark and Haakon IV, ending a war between Denmark and Norway that had started the year before.

== 1260s ==
1261

- 11 September – Prince Magnus married Princess Ingeborg of Denmark in Bergen.
- The Norse community in Greenland agreed to submit to the Norwegian king.
- Death of Knut Haakonsson, nobleman and claimant to the throne (born c. 1208).

1262

- Iceland agreed to submit to the Norwegian king.

1263

- 2 October – Battle of Largs, between Norway and Scotland.
- 6 December – Death of Haakon IV of Norway, king (born 1204).

1266

- 2 July – Treaty of Perth, ending the Scottish–Norwegian War.

== 1270s ==
1270

- Birth of Haakon V of Norway, king (d. 1319).
- Death of Margaret Skulesdatter, queen (born c. 1210).

1274

- King Magnus VI promulgated a new national law, known as Magnus Lagabøtes landslov, the first unified code of laws to apply for the whole country.

== 1280s ==
1280

- Death of Magnus VI of Norway, king (b. 1238).

1283

- 9 April – Death of Margaret of Scotland, Queen of Norway, Queen consort (born 1261).

1287

- Death of Ingeborg of Denmark, Queen of Norway, Queen consort (born c. 1244).

1289

- Start of the War of the Outlaws, between Norway and Denmark.

== 1290–1300 ==
1290

Death of Alv Erlingsson, earl.

1293

- Birth of Erling Vidkunsson nobleman and regent of Norway (died 1355).

1296

- The War of the Outlaws ends, North Halland is ceded to Norway.

1299

- 13 July – Death of Eric II of Norway, King (born c. 1268).
- Euphemia of Rügen married Duke Håkon V of Norway.

1300

- The cathedral chapter at St Mary's Church was established.
