= Swedish expedition to Courland =

Swedish expedition to Courland may refer to:

- Swedish expedition to Courland (854)
- Swedish occupation of Courland in 1625, during the Polish–Swedish War (1621–1625)
- Swedish invasion of Courland in 1658 during the Second Northern War
