= Värmland rebellion =

Rebellion in Värmland

Värmland Rebellion
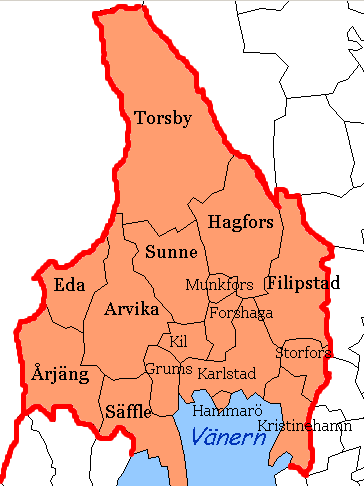
- Map of Värmland county
Date	Autumn 1437 – 1438
Location	Värmland, Närke
Result	Uprising quelled

Belligerents
Sweden	Värmland peasants

Commanders and leaders
(Sweden) Karl Knutsson (Sweden) Arvid Svan	(Värmland) Torsten Ingelsson (executed) (Värmland) Jösse Hansson (executed)

Strength
At least 100–120	At least 700

Casualties and losses
Unknown	At least 140

The Värmland Rebellion was a peasant uprising in the Swedish province of Värmland during the years of 1437–1438. While being successful in the beginning, the rebels were eventually defeated by the troops of Arvid Svan.

== Background ==
Erik Puke was a member of the Swedish National Council and had been very close to Engelbrekt Engelbrektsson. In December 1436 and January 1437, he led an uprising against the national leadership and its most powerful man, Karl Knutsson. The rebellion, the Puke feud, gained strong support among the common people in Mälardalen.

== Rebellion ==
In the autumn of 1437, the rebellion in Värmland broke out, the insurgents are led by the former retainer of Karl Knutsson, Torsten Ingelsson, and Jösse Hansson. The first peasants to rebel were the ones in Älvdalen and Fryksdalen. The Värmlanders killed the bailiff and took over large areas of the province, whereupon the rebellion spread to Närke. The rebels eventually believed themselves to be powerful enough, and marched towards Örebro and Västerås. which are besieged. Both castles was later able to be captured by the Värmlanders.

The Swedish Seneschal of the Realm, Kristiern Nilsson (Vasa), who had the formal responsibility of dealing with the rebel threat, recommended diplomatic talks to confront the rebellion, but Karl Knutsson refused. Due to him having primary military responsibility in the kingdom, appointed Arvid Svan and a force of 100-120 courtiers to subdue the rebellion. Arvid Svan was successful in his task, he pursued the rebels back to Värmland, where many chose to pay taxes and capitulate. In a battle between the troops of Arvid Svan and 700 rebels, and out of the 700, 140 lose their lives.

However, not all of the rebels choose to give up, the ones in the Jösse district put themselves in a defensive stance, and were forced to be put down with force.

== Aftermath ==
After the rebellion was subdued, Arvid Svan continued to ravage Fryksdalen and Älvdalen, and Torsten Ingelsson, along with Jösse Hansson were burned at the stake in February 1438, which formally ended the rebellion
