= Battle of Gataskogen =

Date	1365
Location	Gataskogen, Sweden 59°38′N 16°55′E
Result	Mecklenburgian victory: Magnus Eriksson captured

Belligerents
(Kingdom of Norway (872–1397)) Norway	Mecklenburg: (History of Sweden (800–1521)) Sweden

Commanders and leaders
(Kingdom of Norway (872–1397)) Magnus Eriksson (POW) (Kingdom of Norway (872–1397)) Haakon VI	(History of Sweden (800–1521)) Karl Ulfsson

The Battle of Gataskogen was fought on 3 March 1365, near Enköping. The battle was part of the power struggle for the Swedish throne. Warring parties were, on one side, the former King Magnus Eriksson and his recently deposed son Håkan Magnusson, and on the other, Albert of Mecklenburg, who had recently been elected king of Sweden, and his mercenaries.

The battle resulted in victory for Albert and Magnus Eriksson was captured. King Albert had thus secured his hold on power.
