= 11th century in Norway =

- Other decades
- 9th | 10th | 11th | 12th | 13th

Events from the 11th century in Norway.

== 1010s ==
c. 1015

- Birth of Harald Hardrada, king (d. 1066).

1015

- Olaf II of Norway assumed the title of King of Norway.

1016

- 25 March – Battle of Nesjar.
- The town of Sarpsborg is founded.

== 1020s ==
1024

- 8 June – Birth of Magnus I of Norway, king of Norway and Denmark and son of Olaf II (d. 1047).
- After gaining control over Norway in 1016, Olaf II Haraldsson constructed a religious code which established the Church of Norway. It is considered to represent Norway's first national legislation

1027

- Battle of Boknafjorden.
- The king Olaf II had the local powerful chieftain Erling Skjalgsson killed after the Battle of Boknafjorden. After this, he lost his support, fled from the country to Russia the following year, and when he returned he was defeated in the Battle of Stiklestad in 1030.

1028

- The king, Olaf II, fled from Norway to Russia, and Cnut the Great claimed reign of Norway.

== 1030s ==
1030

- 29 July – Battle of Stiklestad.
- Death of Olaf II of Norway, king (b. c. 995).
- July – Death of Bjørn Stallare, civil servant.

1033

- Battle of Soknasund.
- Death of Tryggvi the Pretender, Viking chieftain.

1035

- King Svein Knutsson fled from Norway to Denmark, and Magnus the Good becomes King of Norway.

== 1040s ==
1042

- 8 June – Magnus the Good becomes King of Denmark, thus establishing a short lived personal union between Norway and Denmark.

1047

- 25 October – Magnus the Good dies, ending the personal union with Denmark. Harald Hardrada becomes King of Norway and Sweyn Estridsson becomes King of Denmark.

1048

The town of Oslo is founded.

== 1060s ==
1062

- 9 August – Battle of Niså.

1066

- 25 September – Battle of Stamford Bridge.
- Death of Harald Hardrada, king (b. c. 1015).

1069

- 28 April – Death of Magnus II of Norway, king (b. c. 1049).

== 1070s ==
1070

- The town of Bergen is founded.

== 1090–1100 ==
1093

- King Magnus Barefoot invades Scotland. The reason was to help the Scottish king Donald Bane to conquer Edinburgh and the Scottish throne.
- 22 September – Death of Olaf III of Norway, king (b. c. 1050).

1095

- February – Death of Haakon Toresfostre, king (b. c. 1069)
