= 12th century in Norway =

- Other decades
- 10th | 11th | 12th | 13th | 14th

Events from the 12th century in Norway.

== 1101–1109 ==
1103

- 24 August - Death of Magnus Barefoot, King (born 1073).

1107

- The Norwegian Crusade sailed from Norway.

== 1110s ==
1115

- 22 December – Death of Olaf Magnusson of Norway, King (born c. 1099).

== 1120s ==
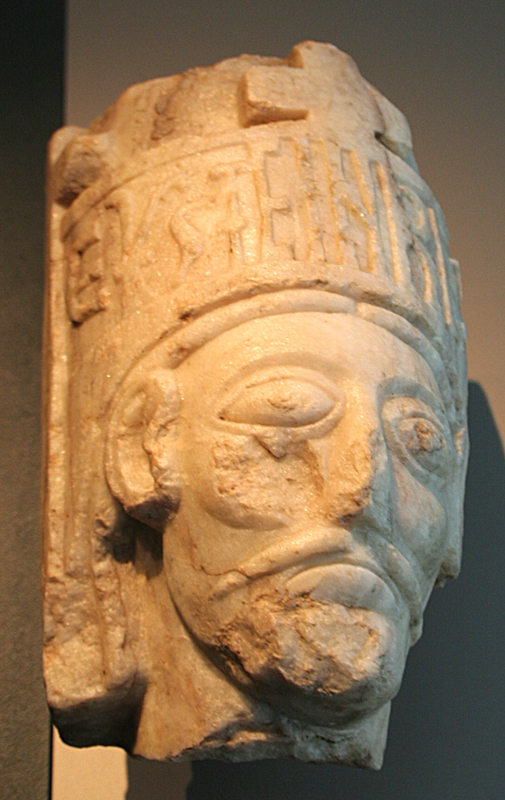
Early 12th century marble bust of Eystein I of Norway

1123

- Kalmare ledung, a Crusade led by King Sigurd to Christianize the Swedish provinces of Småland and Öland.
- 29 August – Death of Eystein I Magnusson, King of Norway 1102–1123 (born c. 1088).

1125

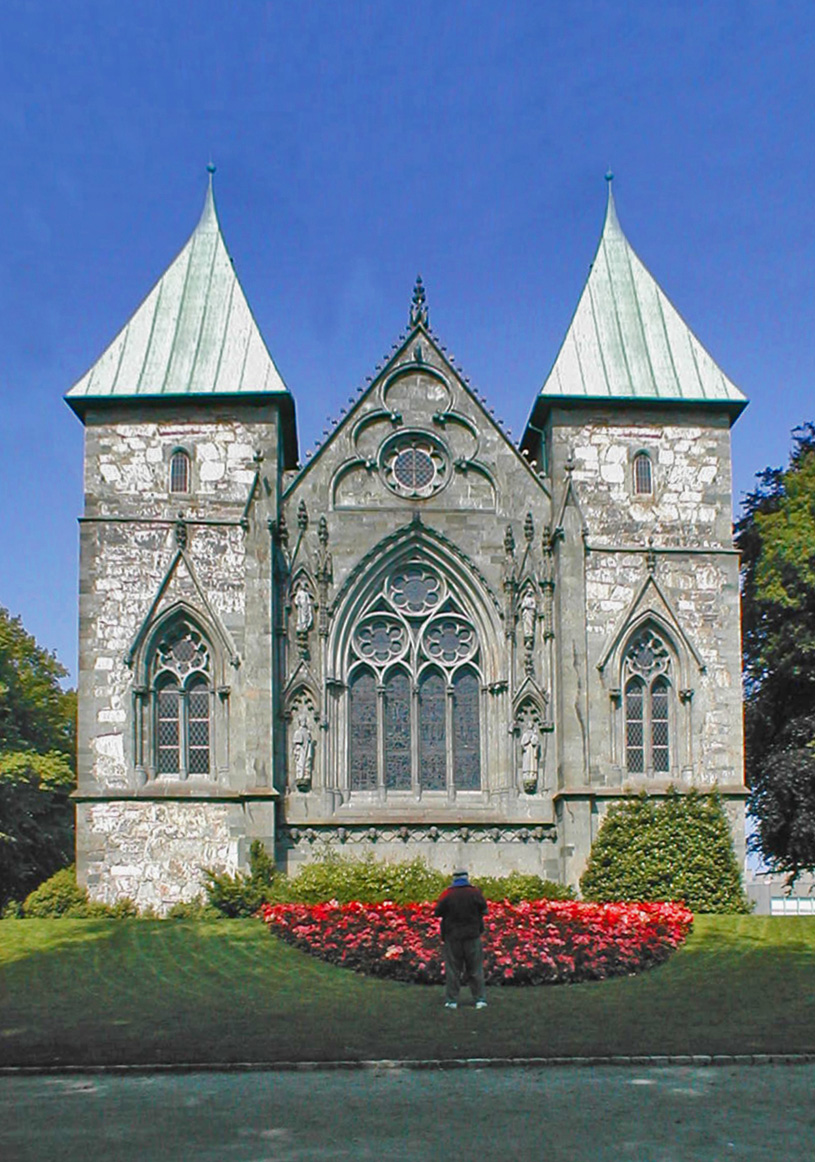
The construction of Stavanger Cathedral supposedly started in 1125.

- 1125 is regarded as the founding year of the city of Stavanger, with the establishing of the Diocese of Stavanger, and construction of the Stavanger Cathedral is initiated.

== 1130s ==
1130

- 26 March – The death of Sigurd the Crusader was followed by a century-long period of civil wars and rivalry for the crown.

1133

- Birth of Sigurd II of Norway, king (died 1155).

1134

- 9 August – Battle of Fyrileiv, the first battle in the Norwegian Civil War.

1135

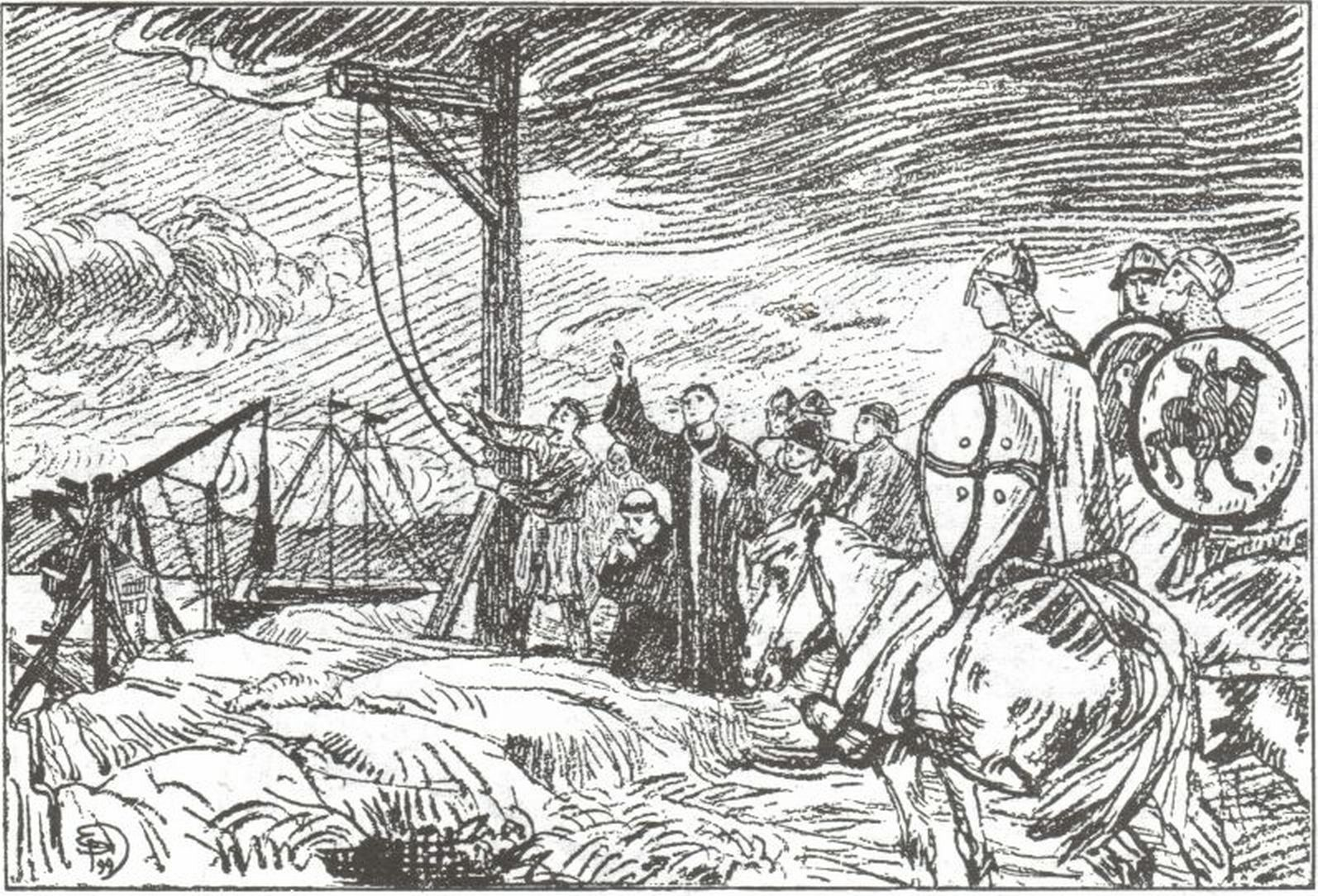
The hanging of Bishop Reinald.

- 7 January – In a naval battle in Bergen, Harald Gille defeated King Magnus. Magnus was captured and dethroned, blinded, castrated and had one leg cut off, and was subsequently placed in the Nidarholm Abbey.
- 18 January – Bishop Reinald of Stavanger was executed by hanging in Bergen.
- 10 August-12 August – Slavic raid on Kungahälla, the raid left irrecoverable damage on the town.

1136

- 14 December – Harald IV Gille is assassinated within his sleep. Sigurd Slembe arranged for the assassination.

1139

- 12 November – Battle of Holmengrå. Magnus IV of Norway, King (born c. 1115) was killed in battle.
- Death of Sigurd Slembe, pretender to the throne.

== 1140s ==
1147

- 18 May – Hovedøya Abbey was founded.
- Birth of Haakon II of Norway, King (died 1162).

== 1150s ==
1152

- Trondheim is given the status of archdiocese.
- Trondheim Cathedral School is established.
- The Second Norwegian Crusade sailed from Norway.

1155

- King Sigurd II of Norway was killed in Bergen by the men of his brother and co-ruler Inge I Haraldsson.

1156

- Birth of Magnus V Erlingsson – King of Norway from 1161 to 1184 (d. 1184).

1157

- 24 February – Death of Jon Birgersson, Archbishop of Nidaros.
- King Eystein II of Norway was killed by supporters of his brother and co-ruler Inge I Haraldsson.

== 1160s ==
1161

- 3 February – King Inge I of Norway was defeated and killed while leading his men into battle against Haakon II of Norway near Oslo.

1162

- 7 July – Battle of Sekken, Haakon II of Norway is killed, and King Magnus V becomes the only King of Norway.

1163

- The first Battle of Re.
- The Norwegian Law of Succession was introduced.
- Archbishop Eysteinn Erlendsson crowned Magnus V of Norway. This was the first time such a ceremony had taken place in Norway.
- 29 September – Death of Sigurd Markusfostre, pretender and rival king (born c. 1155).

== 1170s ==
1176

- Eystein Meyla is proclaimed king at Øreting.

1177

- Battle of Re.
- Death of Eystein Meyla, king pretender.

1178

- The Battle of Hatthammeren, between Sverre Sigurdsson and Eysteinn Erlendsson.
- The Battle of Hørte bro, between Sverre Sigurdsson and Magnus Erlingsson.

1179

- 19 June – The Battle of Kalvskinnet, between Sverre Sigurdsson and Erling Skakke.
- Death of Erling Skakke, earl (born c. 1115).

== 1180s ==
1184

- 15 June – Battle of Fimreite. Magnus V of Norway died in battle.

1185

- Autumn – The Kuvlungs (Kuvlungene) rises up in revolt in Viken. Their leader, Jon Kuvlung, was a former monk and was claimed to be the son of Inge Krokrygg.
- Birth of Inge II of Norway, king (died 1217).

1188

- 26 January – Death of Saint Eysteinn Erlendsson, archbishop (born c. 1120).
- December – The Kuvlung revolt ends.
- Death of Jon Kuvlung, pretender to the crown.

== 1190–1200 ==
1194

- 3 April – Battle of Florvåg. Sigurd Magnusson, nobleman (born c. 1180), died in battle.
