= 10th century in Norway =

- Other decades
- 8th | 9th | 10th | 11th | 12th

Events from the 10th century in Norway.

== 930s ==
c. 930

- Death of Harald Fairhair, king (b. c. 850).

c. 933

- King Eric Bloodaxe is deposed as King of Norway.

== 950s ==
955

- Battle of Rastarkalv took place on the southern part of the island of Frei.

== 960s ==
961

- Battle of Fitjar took place in Fitjar at Stord in the county of Hordaland, Norway.
- Death of Haakon the Good, king (b. c. 920).

962

Death of Sigurd Haakonsson, earl (b. c. 890).

== 970s ==
970

- Death of Harald Greycloak, king (b. c. 935).
- Earl of Lade Haakon Sigurdsson becomes de facto ruler of Norway, nominally under King Harald Bluetooth.

== 980s ==
c. 986

- Battle of Hjörungavágr took place of the coast of Sunnmøre.

== 990–1000 ==
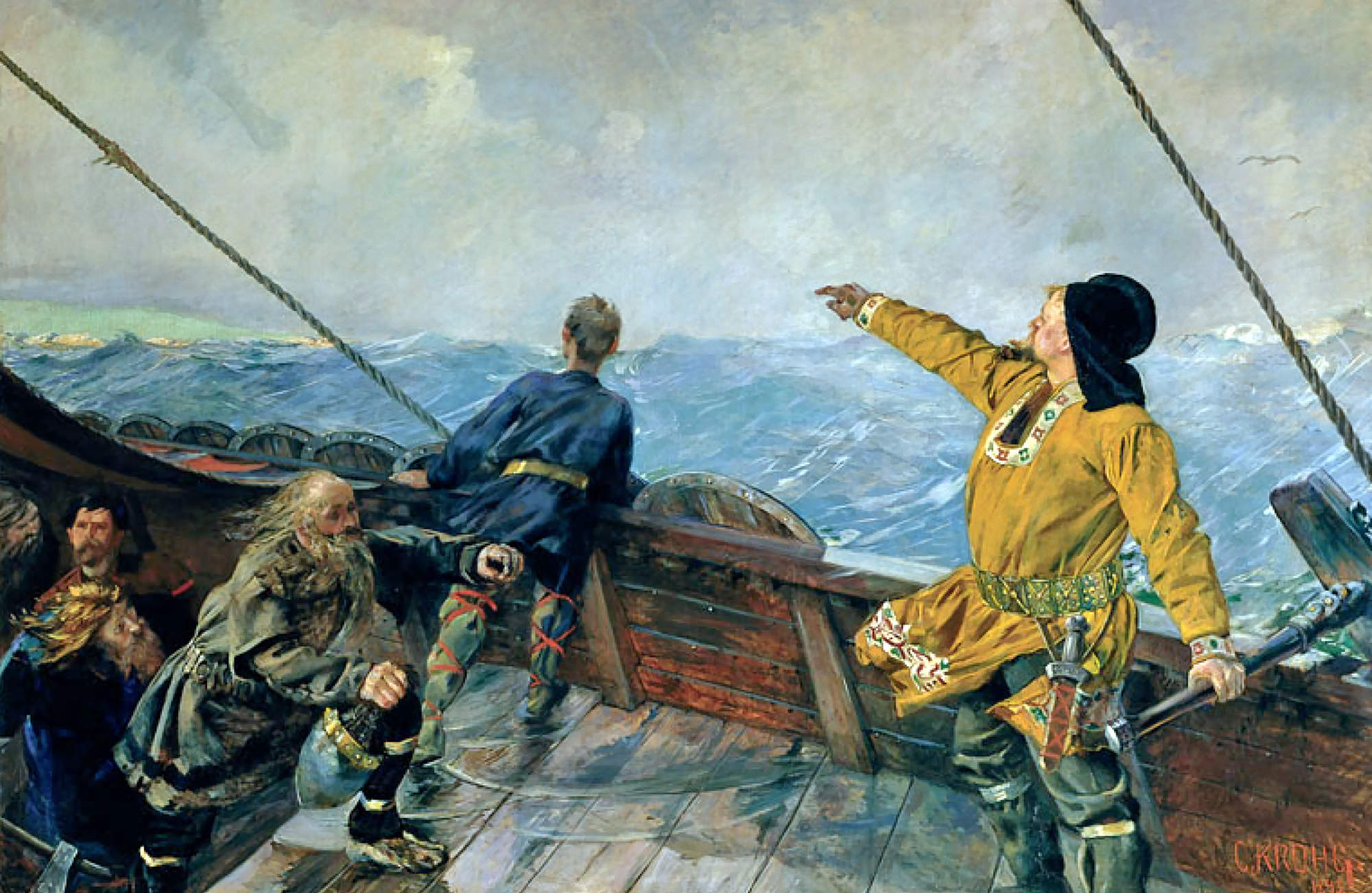
Christian Krogh's painting of Leif Ericson discovering America, 1893

995

- Death of Haakon Sigurdsson, earl (born c. 935).
- Olaf Tryggvason becomes King of Norway.
- King Olaf Tryggvason initiated Norway's earliest domestic minting by striking silver pennies modeled after Anglo-Saxon "Crux" designs.

997

- The city of Nidaros is founded.

c. 1000

- Death of Olaf Tryggvason, king (b. 968).

1000

- Leif Ericson lands in North America, calling it Vinland. This journey became the first European journey in which the continents of the Americas were discovered by European inhabitants, many years before the discovery of America by Christopher Columbus.
- 9 September - Battle of Svolder, after the battle, partitioning of Norway between Sweden and Denmark.

,
