= Battle of Ibiza (1780) =

Date	February 28–29, 1780
Location	Off Ibiza
Result	Swedish victory
Territorial changes	British retreat

Belligerents
Sweden	Great Britain

Commanders and leaders
David Ankarloo (DOW)	Jesperson

Strength
1 frigate	1 cutter

Casualties and losses
1 killed 14 wounded	2 killed

The battle of Ibiza was a minor naval engagement between Sweden and Great Britain despite the two nations not being at war with each other. In 1780, the Swedish Navy frigate Illerim, under the command of David Ankarloo, sailed into the Mediterranean Sea to protect Sweden's merchant shipping against privateers belonging to nations involved in the ongoing conflict. She arrived at Livorno in February 1780, before proceeding to Ibiza.

On February 28, after being damaged by stormy weather, Illerim passed by a 24-gun British privateer captained by a Danish sea captain named Jesperson. Ankarloo ordered his crew to question the privateer on where it was going, but she responded by firing several broadsides at Illerim, which returned fire. The ensuing engagement, which lasted until February 29, was described as sounding like "a terrible shriek and scream of wounded crewmen", and resulted in one man killed and 14 wounded aboard the Swedish frigate and at least two killed on the British privateer.

Ankarloo was seriously wounded and taken to Málaga, where he died of gangrene on March 10. Once Illerim was repaired, it returned home to Sweden. The battle was described in dispatch written by the French consul at Mallorca to France's ambassador to Spain, Armand Marc, comte de Montmorin, who claims were confirmed by Jesperson in an interview with a Florence newspaper.
