= First Swedish–Norwegian union =

Personal union during the 14th century

The First Swedish–Norwegian union (Note: Swedish: Den första svensk-norska unionen. Norwegian: Den første svensk-norske union(en)) was a personal union between the kingdoms of Sweden and Norway. The union was established in 1319, when the three-year-old Magnus Eriksson was elected King of Sweden and at the same time inherited the Norwegian throne from his maternal grandfather, King Haakon V. At the time, Sweden included Finland, while Norway encompassed its overseas colonies: Iceland, Greenland, the Faroe Islands and the northern isles of Orkney and Shetland. In 1332, Magnus also acquired Skåne from Denmark.

The dissolution of this union was a complex and gradual process. A formal decision to dissolve the union was made at the Varberg agreement of 1343, which arranged for the future succession of separate kings for Norway and Sweden. Despite this, the union persisted in some form until the late 14th century, as Magnus Eriksson continued to act as King of Norway alongside his son, Haakon, who became King of Norway in 1355. Haakon was also elected King of Sweden in 1361. In 1363–1364, a rebellion deposed Magnus and Haakon and elected Albrecht of Mecklenburg as King of Sweden, but they nevertheless retained control over Norway and parts of western Sweden. The union was formally broken when Haakon died in 1380.

The Swedish–Norwegian union set the stage for the creation of the Kalmar Union, which brought Sweden, Norway, and Denmark under a single crown. The union was established by Margaret, Haakon's widow and daughter of King Valdemar IV of Denmark, who successfully consolidated the three kingdoms under her rule in 1389.

== Background ==
A marriage took place between Duke Erik Magnusson, son of King Magnus Ladulås of Sweden and Duchess Ingeborg, daughter and heiress of King Haakon V of Norway. His death in 1319 gave the kingdom of Norway by right of inheritance to their three-year-old son Magnus. When he was also elected king of Sweden shortly afterwards in the same year, the first Swedish-Norwegian union came into being.

== Establishment ==
As the three-year-old king was too young to rule, a treaty was signed in 1319. Known as the Treaty of Oslo 1319 or The Treaty of Union in Oslo 1319, it regulated the union between Sweden and Norway during the guardianship of King Magnus Eriksson but lost its validity when Magnus came of age and took over the government himself.

The kingdom of Sweden-Norway would become the largest country in Europe at the time.

=== Under guardianship ===
At first his mother Duchess Ingeborg had a predominant influence on the government. She was present at the signing of the Union Treaty and is mentioned in it in terms that could be interpreted as giving her certain powers in the Riksråd. After the accession of Magnus as king she was included in the Swedish national council. She had received Axvall Castle and a county as maintenance and held court at Varberg Castle, where her son was brought up. She thus had a geographical position of power and at Varberg Castle she surrounded herself with her late husband Eric's former aides, for example the Danish commander Knut Porse (who became her husband after the passing of Haakon Magnusson) and the van Kyren family from Holstein. Suspicion and contradictions quickly arose between Ingeborg and the others in the Riksdråd. Drots Mats Kettilmundsson was forced to resign and was replaced by Östergötland's lawman Knut Jonsson. At a council meeting in Skara in the summer of 1322, the nobles in the Riksråd promised each other that old disputes from the civil war would be forgotten and that no one would join forces with Ingeborg without the consent of the entire council.

In order to avoid Danish interference in Swedish politics, the National council tried to have good relations with the Danish king Erik Menved. Ingeborg and the circle around her instead had contact with Erik Menved's enemies in Denmark and made alliances with his enemies in Germany. In the summer of 1321, a treaty was concluded between the heir to the throne Magnus and Henry II of Mecklenburg. The treaty involved the marriage of Magnus's younger sister Euphemia of Sweden to Duke Albert II of Mecklenburg as well as the promise of mutual aid in the event of an attack from Denmark. In secret, they also agreed on a military attack against Scania. Plans were prepared in 1322 by Knut Porse, but they were not realized.

During the years 1323–1326, the council succeeded in redeeming Ingeborg's castles Axevall, Varberg and Hunehals and relieved her of her place in the council, which was led by Drott Knut Jonsson. The example was followed in 1323 by the Norwegians, who appointed Mr. Erling Vidkunsson as governor. In accordance with the Union Treaty, the union between the two kingdoms was subsequently reduced to a defense alliance. With the Republic of Novgorod, which the relations had long been tense, peace was concluded in Nöteborg in 1323.

=== After guardianship ===
Magnus came of age in 1331 or 1332 and in 1335 he appointed his drots Håkan Mattsson as a marshal, mentioned as a marshal in connection with a will.

On 18 May 1335, King Magnus appointed Nils Abjörnsson as his drots.

Magnus was crowned in Stockholm on July 21, 1336.

== The Scania purchase ==
In 1332 Scania, Blekinge, Ven and Lister were sold to Magnus from Duke Johan of Holstein, after the local population expressed dissatisfaction with Duke Johan and stated they would rather be ruled by the Swedes. The Duke started negotiations with the Swedes and it was agreed that the Swedish king would redeem the pledge for 34,000 marks of silver (6 432 kilo). Sweden would later on buy southern Halland for 8 000 marks in 1341, finally reuniting the county after the Norwegians annexed northern Halland in 1306. Though Magnus bought Skåneland, it was not integrated into the Swedish half. Magnus Eriksson would thus be crowned king of Skåneland in 1332. The union with Skåneland was dissolved in 1360.

After the internal strife in Denmark, Valdemar Atterdag wanted to restore Denmark's former influence and therefore wanted to regain supremacy over Scania. For Magnus, the acquisition of Skåneland threatened to be a bigger bite than he could swallow. The sum of 34,000 marks was an unheard amount at the time, and in order to raise it, the king was forced to borrow money from the church and take loans from magnates in exchange for pledges. In 1326 the king had pledged Kalmar Castle and Kalmar County, all of Östergötland, Gästrikland, Fjärdhundraland, Dalarna, Närke and Värmland. Because the court could no longer receive income from the castle counties, a serious financial crisis emerged and lasted for several years. The king also levied extra taxes, including tolls at the Scanian fishing villages and tougher demands on the mining industry in the Bergslagen. At the beginning of the 1350s, Magnus Eriksson's city law was issued which, among other things, sought to limit trade to the cities as a means of imposing fees.

When the Danish king refused to recognise King Magnus's ownership of Skåneland, Magnus turned to the Pope, requesting confirmation of the purchase but received only evasive answers. Mainly as a result of his mother's lien on certain castles in Denmark, Magnus waged war with King Valdemar. Peace between them was only concluded in the autumn of 1343 in Varberg, when Valdemar formally renounced all claims to Scania, Blekinge and Halland.

== Internal issues ==
=== Norwegian internal issues ===
In 1331, Magnus was declared to have come to age at the age of 15. This provoked resistance in Norway, where a statue stipulated that a king would come to age at the age of 20, causing resistance from Erling Vidkunsson and other Norwegian nobles. The nobles were also dissatisfied with the king, who had taken the national seal out of the country has not appoint a chancellor for Norway during his frequent absences abroad. Some nobles rebelled and conquered Tunsberghus. In 1333 they made peace when the king let a councilor take care of the royal seal and appointed Ivar Ogmundsson as royal seat.

On 21 Iuly 1336, Magnus was crowned king of both Norway and Sweden in Stockholm. This caused further resentment in Norway, where the nobles and magnates wanted a separate Norwegian coronation. A second rising by members of the high nobility of Norway ensued in 1338.

In 1339, an agreement was indeed reached with the dissatisfied Norwegians, but the dissatisfaction continued, and in 1343 Magnus' younger son Haakon VI Magnusson was elected king of Norway. Haakon was supposed to rule under his father's guardianship, but the actual rule was taken over by the Riksråd. The following year, 1344, Magnus' eldest son, Erik Magnusson, was elected heir to the throne in Sweden. He had thus been able to secure kingship for each of his sons.

=== Swedish internal issues ===
The financial crisis in the kingdom, caused by loans and pledges, gave rise to an ever-widening gap between the king and the aristocracy. The king criticized his trustees for managing the finances so badly that there was no money left when he ascended to the throne. The kingdom's finances were also worsened by the growth of tax-exempt arrangements as it took over land that had previously paid taxes to the king.

In the 1340s, the king was forced to improve relations with the aristocracy in the parliament. In April 1346 he sent apologies around the country, stating he was sorry for the high taxes imposed during the acquisition of Skåneland, Magnus also sent a large donation to the Birgitta Birgersdotter to establish a monastery foundation in Vadstena.

== Wars ==
=== Kexholm War ===
In 1321, Novgorodian troops attacked Swedish Viborg, the attack isn't well documented, except that it ended in failure for the Novgorodians and they were forced to retreat. In 1322, Yuri of Moscow arrived in Novgorod and ordered the Novgorodians there to repair several battering rams, while they were being repaired, the Swedes took the chance to attack Kexholm, but the expedition ended in failure.

After this failure, Yuri along with soldiers from Novgorod went to Viborg, and from the 12 August to 9 September they besieged it, the Novgorodians rammed the walls with six battering rams. After they had broken into the town, the Novgorodians killed and hanged many of the people inside, with others being led to the low country. After having laid siege to the fortress for a month, they assaulted it, but this ended in failure, and they were forced to retreat once again.

After the failed siege of Viborg, the Novgorodians were eager to make peace with Magnus, since new problems had sprung up at their southern border.

Any fighting in 1323 is unknown, but it is at this time that representatives from both Sweden and Novgorod sat down to discuss peace. The negotiations took place at the newly established Nöteborg. The Swedish representatives were Erik Turesson, Hemming Ödgislesson, Peter Jonsson, and the priest Vämund. The Novgorodian representatives were the Prince of Novgorod himself attending. A certain Ludwig von Groten also acted as a mediator. When the negotiations were finished, the first ever "eternal peace" had been signed between Sweden and Novgorod, and the border was defined for the first time in history, in the Treaty of Nöteborg.

=== Sten Bielkes´s war against Novgorod ===
In the spring of 1338, a Novgorodian army would march out under the command of Posadnik Fedor Vasilevich to take revenge on the rebels that fled from Karelia into Viborg after a very unpopular regime under Gljeb Naimont. They marched along the Neva. However they would be intercepted at Nöteborg and negotiations would start between the Novgorodians and Viborgs commander, Sten Turesson Bielke, hence the name of the war. Negotiations would fail and the Novgorodians would return home. Afterwards Swedish forces would go ravaging in the Ladoga and Karelia. The swedes would fail to conquer Ladoga fortress, they would instead set fire to it. After their attack the Novgorodians would respond by raiding districts around Nemetski and Karelia, they would completely devastate the countryside.

Later in 1338, yet another Swedish expedition would be sent against Ingria and "the country of the Vod people". The expedition would end in a decisive defeat for the Swedes. Fighting wouldn't stop until the winter of 1338, when envoys from Viborg arrived in Novgorod and made signed a peace treaty. They claimed Sten Turesson Bielke had acted out of order without approval from Magnus Eriksson.

=== The First Crusade ===
In the spring of 1348, Magnus Eriksson sent messengers to the nobles of the Republic of Novgorod and urged them to join the Catholic doctrine, if they refused, a large army would invade Novgorod and force them to adopt Catholicism. The answer was that if Magnus Eriksson wanted to discuss matters of faith, he had to travel to Constantinople, where Novgorod's orthodox doctrine originated.

When the Swedish king received the letter, his invasion fleet was already ready at the Novgorod border. On 24 June, Nöteborg was besieged and the farmers in the area were forcibly baptized. Those who refused were beheaded or stabbed to death. On 6 August, the king and the other crusaders returned home, leaving a small garrison behind the walls. Already in the late winter of 1349, Novgorod besieged and captured the weakly defended city. The foreigners were killed or captured and the residents were forced to let their beards grow again.

=== The Second Crusade ===
In Sweden, the Black Death had struck in full force. It was understood that God was displeased with something. The king ordered the commoners to appear barefoot in the churches every Friday with a penny for the church to finance another invasion of Novgorod. Through negotiations and threats, King Magnus tried to get the Hansa to agree to a boycott of Novgorod in return for increased privileged trade with Visby and Livonia. Then in 1350, he set off again with a Swedish force led by among others the knights Israel Birgersson, Lars Karlsson, Magnus Gislesson, with the men-at-arms Bengt Algotsson and Sune Håkansson, moving east to recaptured Nöteborg. As before he had the inhabitants forcibly baptized and left behind troops of soldiers. The city was again recaptured soon afterwards and the soldiers were killed. The king himself and the military leaders fled back to Sweden.

== Treaty of Nöteborg and Novgorod ==
=== Treaty of Nöteborg ===
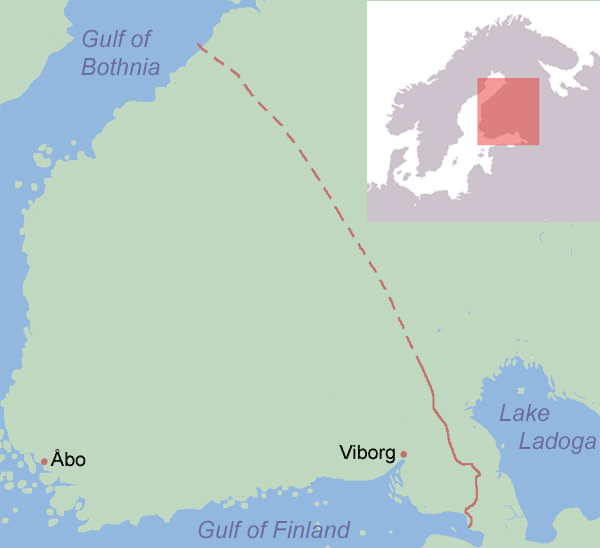
The Treaty of Nöteborg's possible border between Sweden and Novgorod, approximately corresponding to Jarl Gallén's conclusions.

The Treaty of Nöteborg was signed after the Kexholm war on 12 August 1323. Signed in Orshek (Swedishː Nöteborg), it was the first settlement between Sweden and The Novgorod Republic regulating their border which stretched into the area known as today's Finland. The purpose was "permanent peace" between Sweden and Novgorod but it did not last very long.

The treaty was negotiated with the help of Hanseatic merchants in order to conclude the Swedish-Novgorodian Wars. As a token of goodwill, Novgorod ceded three Karelian parishes to Sweden. As a result, Sweden undertook not to participate in any conflict between Novgorod and the Danish Duchy of Estonia. Both sides also promised not to build castles along the new border.

The treaty defined the border as beginning east and north of Viborg Castle, running along the Sestra and Volchya Rivers, splitting the Karelian Isthmus in half, running across Savonia and, according to traditional interpretations, ending in the Gulf of Bothnia near the Pyhäjoki River. However the wording "the sea in the north" can as well mean the Arctic Ocean.

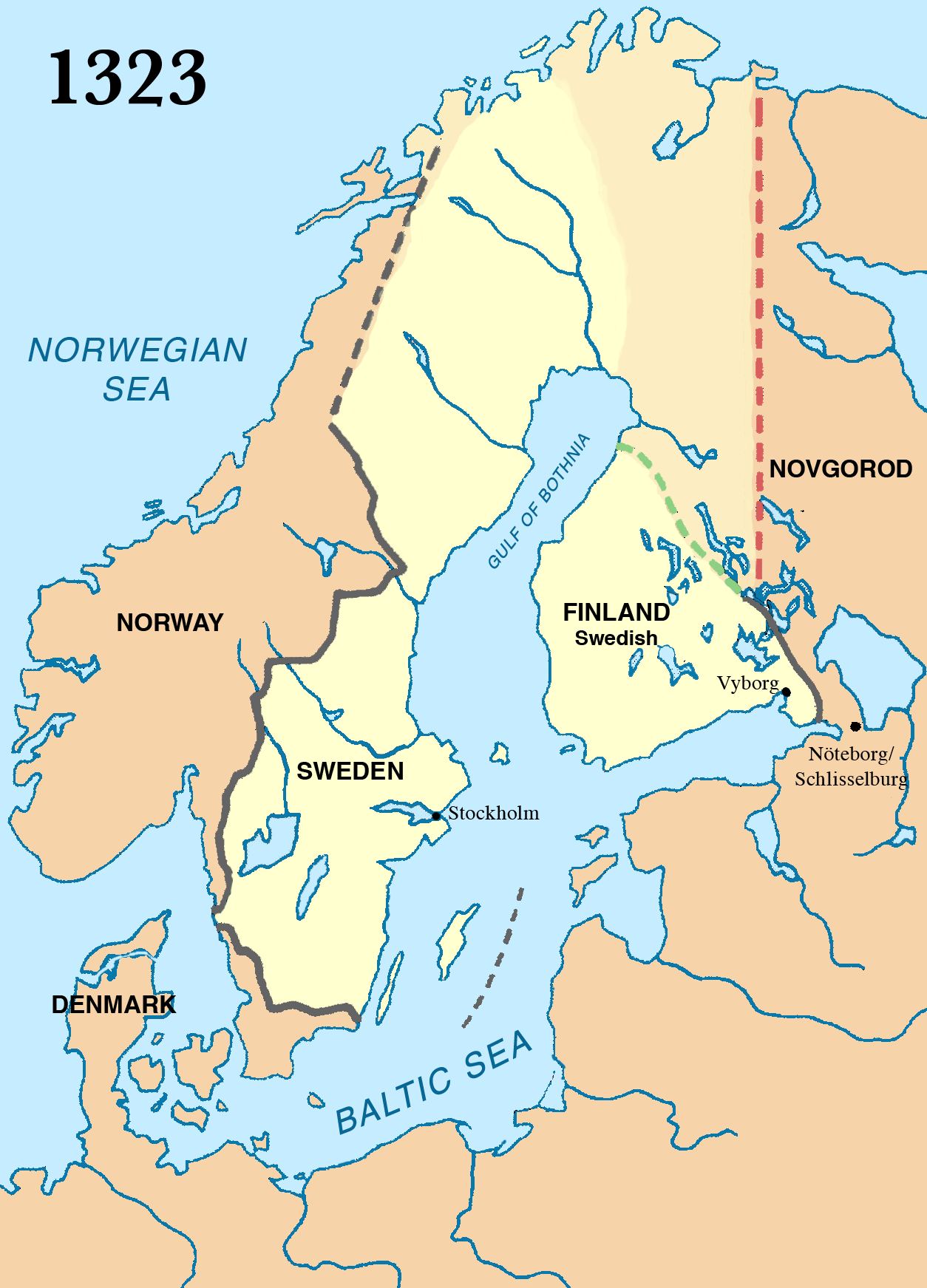
Rough map of Sweden (only) in the year 1323 after the signing of Nöteborg.

Only the southern part of the border, close to Viborg, was actually considered important and clearly defined in the treaty. Borders in the wilderness were defined very roughly, and presumably considered less important than the line across the Karelian Isthmus. It has also been suggested that the treaty would have originally given both Sweden and Novgorod joint rights to northern Ostrobothnia and Lappland.

As early as 1328, Sweden was encouraging settlers to take over the northern coast of the Gulf of Bothnia, which possibly was defined by the treaty as Novgorod's possession. By 1350, the Swedes had successfully expanded around the Gulf of Bothnia, connecting the other half of their kingdom (which was Österland or also known as Finland).

=== Treaty of Novgorod ===
The Treaty of Novgorod was signed on 3 June 1326 in Novgorod and marked the end of decades of the Norwegian-Novgorodian border skirmishes in the far-northern region of Finnmark. The terms were an armistice for 10 years.

The treaty did not delineate the border but rather stipulated which part of the Sami people would pay tribute to Norway and which to Novgorod, creating a kind of buffer zone in between the countries.

== Dissolution ==
=== Rebellion ===
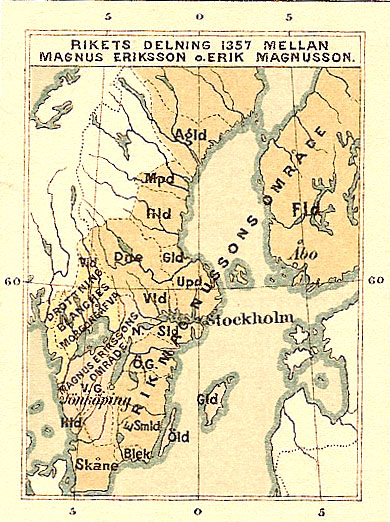
Swedish partition in 1357 AD between Magnus Eriksson and his son Erik Magnusson

In 1358, Magnus Eriksson had to borrow from the money that was collected in Sweden on behalf of the papal throne, and when he could not repay this at the appointed time, both he and his pledges (several of the kingdom's nobles) were threatened with excommunication. Dissatisfaction with the king's policies erupted in the rebellion started by Magnus Eriksson's eldest son, Erik, together with several of the kingdom's nobles in 1356.

After a meeting in Jönköping in 1357 between Magnus Eriksson and Erik Magnusson they decided to split the kingdom between father and son. Erik was appointed to rule over Skåneland (except northern Halland), Östergötaland, Finland and parts of Småland.

After another resolution Erik was also given Södermanland, Västmanland, Dalarna and larger parts of Uppland and Stockholm Castle.

The disagreement between them soon broke out again, and Magnus Eriksson then turned to King Valdemar in Denmark with a request for help, concluding a treaty with him in 1359. However King Erik and his wife Beatrix died quite suddenly, probably as a result of the black death in June 1359, and Magnus Eriksson again became the sole ruler of the whole of Sweden.

=== King Valdemar's attack ===
The intended union was thwarted in 1360, when King Valdemar suddenly reclaimed the Scanian territories by force of arms. He continued his successful campaign in 1361 against Gotland, which unlike Scania had never belonged to the Danes. This led to the formation of a large attack coalition against King Valdemar, including several Hanseatic cities, as well as Sweden and Norway.

The Hanseatics reacted strongly to King Valdemar's rise in power, as they were keen for a balance of power to prevail in the Nordic region and that law, order and for fixed privileges to be maintained at the Skånemarket, the international trade fair held every autumn on the Falsterbo peninsula. The confederates waged war in Scania in 1368–69 and besieged, among other things, the important royal towns of Helsingborg (Kärnan) and Lindholmen (at Börringesjön in southwestern Scania).

Magnus Eriksson had been deposed from the Swedish throne in 1364 and succeeded by Albrecht of Mecklenburg, who personally took part in the war. He resided during the summer and autumn of 1368 at Falsterbohus and then used the title "lord of the land of Skåne".

In November 1369, the warring parties reached an agreement, ratified by the peace treaty of Stralsund in 1370. Loyal to the king, Denmark had suffered a clear but hardly devastating military defeat.

=== Re-unification ===
In 1362 Håkan Magnusson was elected king of Sweden after his father King Magnus was thrown in prison. Magnus and Håkan later became co-regents.

=== Second dissolution ===
The war that started against Valdemar did not lead to any result and already in the autumn of 1362 peace negotiations began. In the winter, the situation changed completely when Haakon, probably in the hope of regaining Scania, married Valdemar's daughter, Margareta (April 1363). As a result, the engagement entered into by the nobles on his behalf with Elizabeth of Holstein was broken. At the same time, several of the Swedish leaders were also driven into exile. They then turned to Duke Albert the Great of Mecklenburg and offered the Swedish crown to his son, Albert. In November 1363, he arrived with an army in Stockholm, was praised by its citizens and was elected king in February 1364 at Mora stenar. Magnus Eriksson and his son could not put up any effective resistance, so that by July 1364 they held no more than Västergötland, Värmland and Dalsland in Sweden proper. In the spring of 1365, they did seek to regain what was lost, but were defeated in March 1365 in the battle of Gataskogen, near Enköping, where Magnus Eriksson was captured.

== See also ==
- Union between Sweden and Norway, personal union in 1814–1905
