= Västbo peasant uprising =

Peasant uprising in Reftele in 1616

- Map over Västbo parish
Date	May 23, 1616
Location	Västbo, Småland
Result	Swedish victory

Belligerents
(yes) Swedish Empire	Rebels

Commanders and leaders
(yes) Gustavus Adolphus (yes) Nils Stiernsköld (yes) Olof Hård	Unknown (executed)

The Västbo peasant uprising was a peasant uprising in Västbo parish, Småland, Sweden, in 1616. They were upset about the thievery of their bailiff, Lars Andersson.

== Background ==
=== Reason for the rebellion ===
In Västbo parish, in what is now Gislaved, the peasants were under high taxes. The reasoning for their high taxes was the Treaty of Knäred, which forced Sweden to buy back Älvsborg from Denmark. Their anger was directed against the local bailiff, Lasse Andersson, who had collected the taxes in a very selfish manner. He was accused of giving himself a much too large salary, both on the expense of the peasants and the state. As a result of this, the peasants wanted revenge and began discussing a raid on his farm.

== Rebellion ==
The rebellion began when the peasants attacked the local judge, Olof Hård, and local officials. They demanded that Lasse Andersson be placed on trial and be found guilty of theft. However, he was not present as he was in Stockholm which likely saved his life.

Since Lars was not present, the peasants instead attacked his clerk. He was seen as an accomplice in the bailiffs thievery. When the peasants attacked the clerk, he reportedly ran under a table and hid behind the judge. The peasants began tearing down the barn where the meeting was being held, they also began pointing muskets towards the clerk. The judge, Olof Hård, tried to save the scribes life by aiming his loaded musket towards the peasants, and ordered them;

"vilken som skjuter, honom ska jag strax lägga brevid."

Rough translation:

"whoever shoots, I'll put him right next to it."

The peasants responded by pointing out that he only had one bullet, and thus could only shoot one of them. They also yelled that they had nothing to lose, since the bailiff had already deprived them of everything. In the same moment, someone managed to get ahold of the clerk, and dragged him outside where he was beaten to death. Olof Hård was not able to get ahold of the clerk's body afterwards, and had no other choice but to leave.

News of the death of the clerk quickly reached the king, and the governor Nils Stiernsköld held an investigation in Villstad rectory on June 3. In December, the King Gustavus Adolphus, intervened personally; those who were found guilty were executed in Jönköping. However, the king also ordered Stiernsköld to investigate the bailiff, with the result of the peasants being vindicated in their complaints. The bailiff was also sentenced to die, but he was pardoned and, made to pay a fine instead.

== Aftermath ==
After the pardon, Lars Andersson continued with his wrongdoings. At the hundred court in Ölmestad on 23 October 1619, a certain Jon Andersson filed a complaint against the former bailiff Lars Andersson. He was said to have driven Jon away from a small crown tenancy and seized it for himself. The court eventually ordered Lars to hand over the farm to its rightful tenant.
