= Engelbrekt rebellion =

Military conflict

Engelbrekt Rebellion
- Part of a series of Dano-Swedish Wars
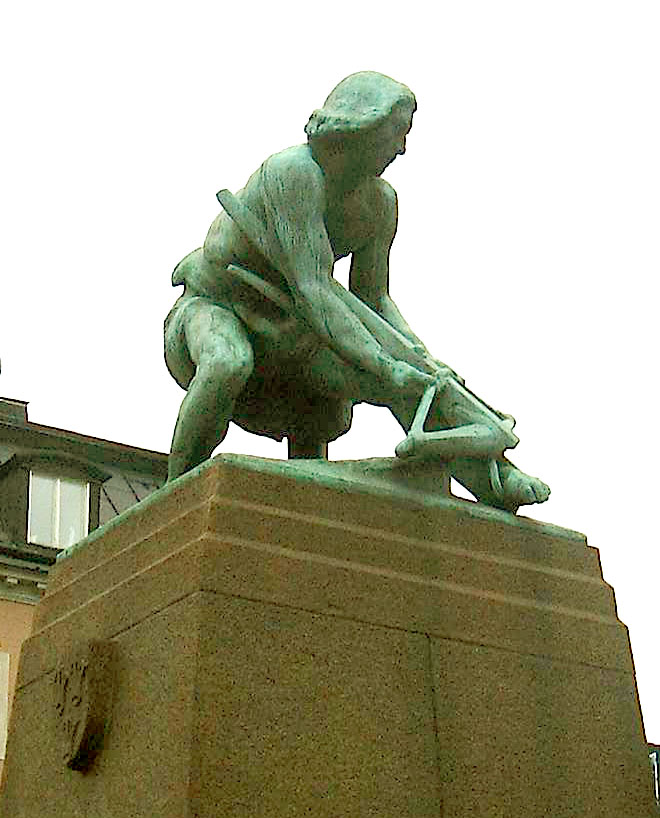
- Statue of Engelbrekt at Kornhamnstorg in Stockholm
Date	1434–1436
Location	Sweden
Result	Swedish victory
Territorial changes	Danish forces temporarily expulsed from Sweden

Belligerents
Sweden	Kalmar Union; Denmark

Commanders and leaders
Engelbrekt Engelbrektsson	Eric of Pomerania

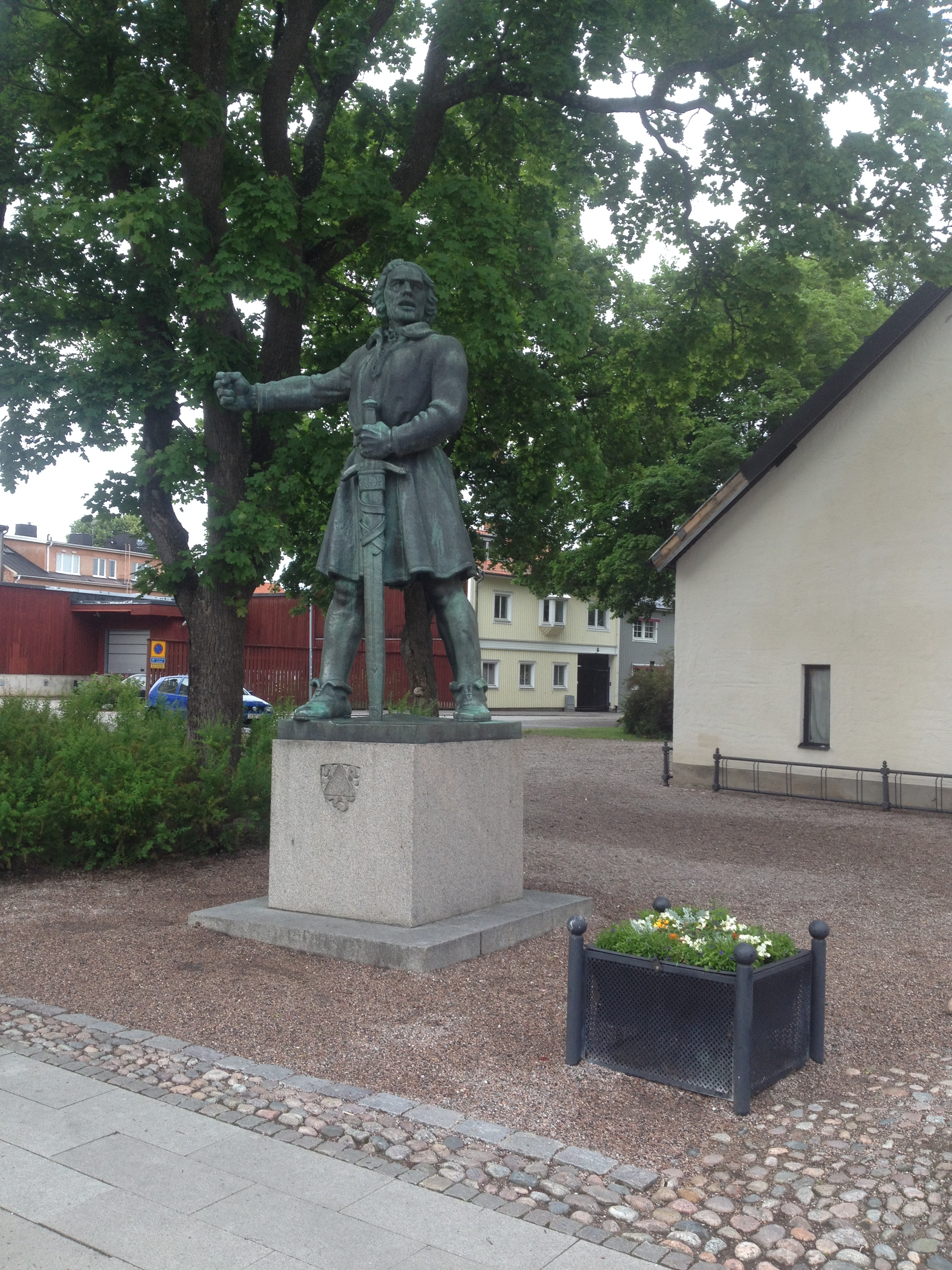
Bronze statue of Engelbrekt in Arboga. Sculpted by Carl Eldh, 1935

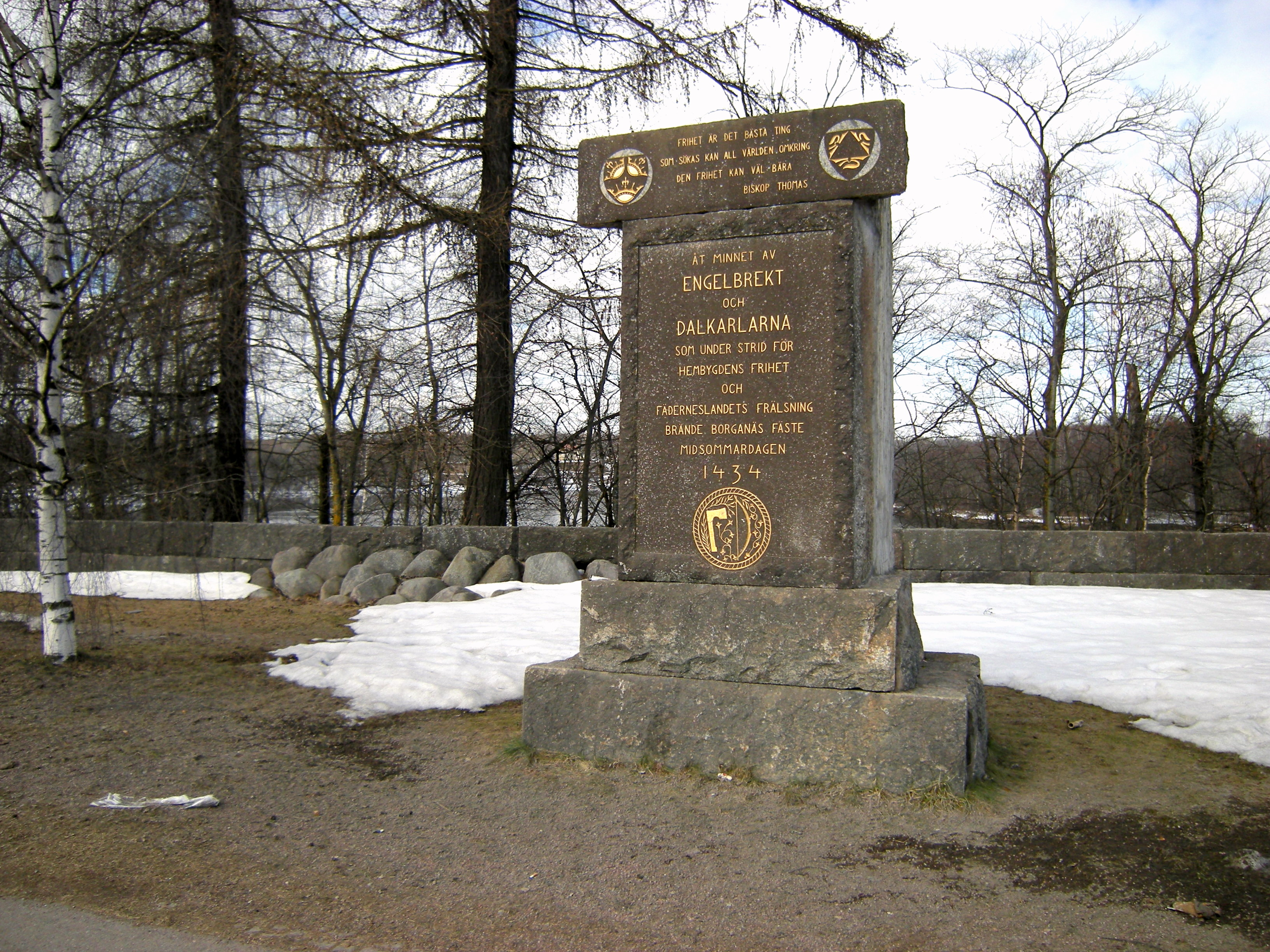
Engelbrekt Monument at Borganäs

The Engelbrekt rebellion (Swedish: Engelbrektsupproret) was an uprising during 1434–1436 led by Swedish miner and nobleman Engelbrekt Engelbrektsson and directed against Eric of Pomerania, the king of the Kalmar Union. The uprising, with its center in Dalarna and Bergslagen, spread throughout Svealand and Götaland. The rebellion caused erosion within the unity of the Kalmar Union, leading to the temporary expulsion of Danish forces from Sweden.

== Background ==
In 1434, Sweden was part of the Kalmar Union, a personal union that united Sweden with Denmark and Norway under a single monarch, Eric of Pomerania. The Swedes were not happy with the Danes' frequent warfare on Schleswig, Holstein, Mecklenburg, and Pomerania, which disturbed Swedish exports (notably iron) to the Continent. During the Danish-Holstein-Hanseatic war, while the exports were brought to a halt, the collection of taxes continued, enraging Swedish peasants. Furthermore, the centralization of government in Denmark raised suspicions. The Swedish Privy Council wanted to retain a fair degree of self-government.

== Rebellion ==
Engelbrekt Engelbrektsson, with interests in the mining region of Bergslagen, stood out as the leader. In 1431 or 1432, Engelbrekt Engelbrektsson had been appointed spokesman for the people of Bergslagen to persuade King Erik to dismiss the local bailiff in Västerås, Jens Eriksen. Negotiations with Eric took place in Vadstena in August 1434, but were unsuccessful. In the summer of 1434, enraged miners and peasants burned Borganäs castle near Borlänge. The tension spread, causing several assaults on castles across the country. Jens Eriksen fled to Denmark and was replaced by the count Hans av Eberstein. However, Engelbrekt and his followers were not happy as their demand that Jens Eriksen should face legal prosecution was not followed up on. The ombudsman of King Erik had found Jens Eriksen's actions to be illegal prior to the uprisings, which were in large reactions to the failure of the government to take action against the bailiff.

In January 1435 Engelbrekt summoned representatives from the four Estates to a Diet in Arboga, which later has been called the first Riksdag of the Estates (although it is uncertain whether the peasants really participated). Engelbrekt was elected Captain (Rikshövitsman) of the Swedish realm. The antagonism abated when Eric promised changes for the better. However, as before, people felt these promises were not being fulfilled, hence the rebels picked up their axes once more. On April 27, 1436, a rebel army unit was sent marching towards Stockholm, where people still supported Eric due to the strong and influential Danish presence in the city.

A certain degree of inner tension among the rebelling forces occurred because the nobility and clergy decided to support Karl Knutsson Bonde, who in 1436 had risen to the position of Rikshövitsman. Neither dared remove Engelbrekt completely because of his strong support among the burghers and peasants. However, Engelbrekt fell sick and became less active. In a twist of fate highly beneficial to Knutsson, Engelbrekt was assassinated on May 4 by Måns Bengtsson (Natt och Dag), the cause being an unrelated personal conflict. Karl Knutsson Bonde gave Jens Eriksen a letter of safe passage (lejdebrev) and the bailiff returned to Sweden to visit Vadstena Abbey in December 1436. However, as word got out of his presence, the peasantry of the nearby village of Aska broke into the monastery and brought Jens Eriksen to a local court in Motala. The judge found Jens Eriksen guilty and he was beheaded by sword.

Consequently, Knutsson won the power struggle and would become King Charles VIII of Sweden in 1448. Riksråd Erik Puke attempted to rally Engelbrekt's old supporters in the Pukefejden, but it was too late. Erik Puke was apprehended and executed in Stockholm in 1437.

== Consequences ==
The Engelbrekt rebellion caused the unity of the Kalmar Union to erode, leading to the temporary expulsion of Danish forces from Sweden. Although later Danish kings regained influence over Sweden, the rebellion had set a precedent for Swedish claims to sovereignty. It also set a precedent for peasants to engage actively in Swedish politics. While it is uncertain whether all four Estates participated in the Diet (Riksdag) in Arboga, this was in fact the case in 1436, when a Diet was held in Uppsala following the death of Engelbrekt. Thus, the Engelbrekt rebellion marked the start of a democratic institution, which, to a certain extent, included the peasants.

== See also ==
- Popular revolts in late-medieval Europe
- Riksdag of the Estates

== Other sources ==
- Ahnlund, Nils (1934) Engelbrekt : tal och uppsatser (Stockholm : Svenska kyrkans diakonistyrelse)
- Ahnlund, Nils (1917) Erik Pukes släkt (Stockholm : Historisk tidssskrift)
- Lundegård, Axel (1913) Om Engelbrekt, Erik Puke och Karl Knutsson som blef kung (Stockholm : Aktiebolaget Ljus förlag)
