= Herdis Torvaldsdatter =

Norwegian noblewoman and landowner

- Born: c. 1310
- Died: 1363 (aged 52–53)
- Spouses: Svein Sigurdsson; possibly Bjarne Erlingsson

Herdis Torvaldsdatter (c. 1310–1363) was a Norwegian noblewoman and landowner who was one of the largest and most noted female landowner in Norway in her time.

== Life ==
Herdis Torvaldsdatter was born around 1310 and was the daughter of Torvald Toresson (c. 1265 – c. 1330) and his second wife Ragndid Jonsdatter (c. 1295–1312), daughter of Jon Raud Ivarsson til Sudreim. Torvald Toresson served as the Sysselmann in Shetland and as such was the royal representative of the Kingdom of Norway.

Torvaldsdatter's first marriage was to Svein Sigurdsson, who was significantly older than her. She had a significant dowry from her parents and her new husband lavished large gifts to her, mostly in the form of land. When Sigurdsson died in 1332, her wealth, including her dowry and her husband's gifts, totalled at least 350 forngilde marks. Torvaldsdatter did remarry, however who to is uncertain. Historian Peter Andreas Munch speculated that she married prominent knight Bjarne Erlingsson in 1343. Both of her marriages were childless.

At the time, widows in Norway generally had more financial and legal freedom than other women, which Torvaldsdatter took full advantage of when she was widowed a second time. Between 1355 and 1360, she acquired large properties in Shetland, and became active in various land transactions there.

As she had no clear heirs, on her deathbed, Torvaldsdatter declared that she wanted her estate to be used for a Cistercian monastery. These plans received both papal and royal approval, despite the law only allowing a tenth of inherited property and a quarter of self-acquired property to be donated. However, these plans never came to fruition as when she died in 1363, the bulk of her estate was inherited by two of her cousins, Jon Havtoresson (c. 1312 – c. 1390) and Sigurd Havtoresson (c. 1315 – c. 1392), who were the sons of her uncle Havtore Jonsson (1275–1320) and his wife Agnes Haakonsdatter (1290–1319), who was the daughter of Haakon V.

== See also ==
- Sudreim claim
