= List of Swedish military commanders =

This is a list of Swedish military commanders. Several Swedish monarchs also acted directly as military commanders.

== 17th century ==
- Jacob de la Gardie (1583–1652), Field Marshal
- Gustav Horn (1592–1657), Field Marshal
- Johan Banér (1596–1641), Field Marshal
- Per Brahe (1602–1680)
- Lennart Torstenson (1603–1651), Field Marshal
- Nils Brahe (1604–1632)
- Lorens von der Linde (1610–1670), Field Marshal
- Carl Gustaf Wrangel (1613–1676), Field Marshal

== 18th century ==
- Jacob Magnus Sprengtporten (1727–1786)
- Göran Magnus Sprengtporten (1740–1819)
- Johan Christopher Toll (1743–1817), Field Marshal
- Axel von Fersen the Younger (1755–1810)
- Gustaf Mauritz Armfelt (1757–1814)

== 19th century ==
- Carl Johan Adlercreutz (1757–1815)
- Georg Carl von Döbeln (1758–1820)
- Johan August Sandels (1764–1831)
- Nils Magnus Brahe (1790–1844)

== 20th century ==
- Lennart Ljung (1921-1990)

== 21st century ==
- Fredrik Ståhlberg (born 1966)
- Laura Swaan Wrede (born 1964)

== Monarchs as military commanders ==
- Gustavus Adolphus the Great (1594–1632)
- Charles X Gustav (1622–1660)
- Charles XI (1655–1697)
- Charles XII (1682–1718)
- Gustav III (1746–1792)
- Charles XIII (1748–1818)
- Charles XIV John (1763–1844)

== See also ==
- List of Swedish field marshals
- List of wars involving Sweden
- Supreme Commander of the Swedish Armed Forces
