= Jödde Stims uprising =

Uprising in Småland

Date	1624
Location	Möre, Småland
Result	Uprising quelled

Belligerents
(yes) Swedish Empire	Rebels

Commanders and leaders
(yes) Sven Håkansson (yes) Bengt Kafle (yes) Jonas Rothovius	Jödda Stims (executed)

Units involved
Unknown	Kronoberg Regiment

Strength
Unknown	Unknown

Casualties and losses
Unknown	At least 5 executed

Jödde Stims uprising, also called the Madesjö uprising (Swedish: Madesjöupproret) was an uprising in Möre, Småland, in 1624. The rebels were led by Jödde Stims, but the uprising was eventually defeated. The uprising was directed against their commander, Patrick Ruthven.

== Background ==
When Gustavus Adolphus called on the Riksdag in Örebro in 1617, it was, according to himself, to suppress "all kinds of talk and chatter". This meeting of the Riksdag also marked the culmination of the intolerance of political and religious dissent by the government.

== Uprising ==
=== Kronoberg conspiracy ===
A conspiracy in the Kronoberg Regiment was created in 1624 under the leadership of Jödda Stims, they were dissatisfied for not being paid their guerdons.

=== Beginning ===
The uprising began with unrest within knights, many of their officers were foreign and the knights did not accept this. The knights intended to start a peasant uprising. The occurrence of the officers treating their subordinates was not uncommon. On the 3 August Jacob De la Gardie received a letter from the government ordering him to stop "The slavery and thraldom that the Finnish officers are doing with their [...] knights."

One of the leaders of the uprising was the soldier Jödda Stims, according to some sources a relative of Nils Dacke. Him and his companions planned the uprising for March. They wished for an uprising alike to the one by Nils Dacke from 1542-1543. It is also believed that Polish spies helped to stir up the uprising.

=== Intervention ===
Sven Håkansson, the Knekthövitsman, received news of the plans and assembled loyal troops to attack the conspirators. Several minor battles were fought in Southern Möre, the knights were eventually arrested. 5 of them were executed on the spot while Jödda Stims and 3 other leaders were taken to Stockholm to be tortured and executed. Two knights were able to escape the fighting, but they were later chased into a courtyard and barricaded themselves. It was later set alight by the pursuers and the two soldiers burned to death.

=== Attempted resurgence ===
Some of the more disgruntled Möre peasants armed themselves once more and organized for a battle. The local governor, Bengt Kafle, remained confident and before the uprising had a chance to begin again he had quelled it and the leaders were arrested.

== Aftermath ==
By the correspondence between local authorities and Stockholm show that the rebellious knights were not what the state feared. Gustavus and his advisors instead feared that the unrest would spread to the collective peasants, which it eventually did.
