= Swedish expedition to Courland (854) =

Swedish expedition to Courland

Date	854
Location	Courland, Seeburg (Grubin), Aputra
Result	Swedish victory
Territorial changes	Courland becomes subject to Sweden

Belligerents
(History of Sweden (800–1521)) Sweden	Curonians

Commanders and leaders
(History of Sweden (800–1521)) Olaf of Sweden	Unknown

Strength
Presumably large	7,000 at Seeburg; 15,000 at Aputra

Casualties and losses
Heavy	At least 7,000 killed

The Swedish expedition to Courland was an early military expedition undertaken by the Swedish king Olof against the rebellious Curonians who had started refusing to pay tribute to him earlier. The expedition was mentioned by the Rimbert Chronicle as a "roaring success".

== Prelude ==
After the Curonians began their rebellion, The Danes, seeing an opportunity to make them pay tribute to them instead, collected a large number of ships, most likely under the command of a man named Hasting proceeded to the country, prepared to seize their goods and to subject them to themselves.

The Curonian kingdom contained five towns, When the inhabitants heard of the Danish invasion they gathered people from all of their towns together to resist the Danes. However, after the Danes confronted them, it did not end up well for them, who suffered a crushing defeat against the Curonians. After defeating the Danes, the Curonians killed half of the Danes and looted their ships, taking from them gold and silver and much plunder.

After being notified of the Danish defeat and wishing to win the reputation of being able to do what the Danes could not and because the Curonians had previously been subject to him, Olaf immediately began assembling a large fleet in Birka in order to subjugate the Curonians.

== Expedition ==
At first, the Swedes arrived at Seeburg, a town in the Curonian kingdom, which had a garrison of about seven thousand warriors. There, they managed to destroy the entire Curonian army, captured and later pillaged and burned the town. Afterward, they marched for five days to Aputra, which had a large garrison of fifteen thousand fighters. Upon the arrival of the Swedes, the town's defenders barricaded themselves within the city, which prompted the Swedes to attempt an assault on the city, leading to an eight-day long standoff, with neither side achieving victory. On the ninth day, the Swedes, exhausted and far away from their ships, became desperate. They resorted to casting lots to seek divine intervention, but no god favored them. Distressed, they turned to a counsel of merchants who encouraged them to invoke the Christian God. Casting lots revealed to the Swedes Christ's willingness to aid them. Encouraged by this, they decided to assault the town, believing they had Christ as their ally. As they prepared for the assault, the town's inhabitants had a desire for peace and negotiations. The Swedish King agreed to this request, and they proposed a peace agreement.

The Curonian proposal included offering all the gold and plunder taken from the Danes the previous year in exchange for an agreement. Additionally, they were willing to provide half a pound of silver for each person in the town. They would also resume tribute payments and furnish hostages, signifying their commitment to Swedish authority, as in the past. Despite this offer, the younger soldiers, driven by their will for battle, remained unappeased, insisting on capturing the town by force and taking its inhabitants as captives. The King and his advisors, however, favored a more wise approach. They decided to accept the offer, struck an agreement, and departed with riches and thirty hostages in tow. The Curonians would also pledge allegiance to the Swedes.

== Aftermath ==
In 862, the Curonians rose up again and expelled the Swedes, however this did not stop the Swedish ambitions, since they returned later and began constructing several forts in Courland.
