= Puke feud =

Feud in Sweden in the 1430s

The Puke feud was a feud between the followers of riksråd Erik Puke and the followers of the later Charles VIII of Sweden in 1436 and 1437.

The feud originated from the Engelbrekt rebellion, as the Puke party accused the party of Charles of having murdered Engelbrekt Engelbrektsson. After the rebellion, many fiefs had been left without a holder, and after having failed to distribute them fairly among the nobility in 1436, the opposition around Puke challenged Charles in open civil war. A number of cities, Arboga, Köping, and Örebro, rebelled, and the rebels defeated the forces of Charles in the Battle of Hällaskogen on 17 January 1437. During peace negotiations in Västerås, Eric Puke was captured and brought to Stockholm, and was executed there in March 1437.
