= Erling Vidkunsson =

Norwegian noble

Erling Vidkunsson (1293–1355) was a Norwegian nobleman and the regent of Norway. He received the position of High Justiciar (drottsete) of the country. He was Lord of Bjarkøy and Giske and was probably the most important and wealthy Norwegian noble of his era.

Erling Vidkunsson was born into a noble family of Bjarkøy which held lands principally in northern Norway. The ancestral seat was in Hålogaland, in the region of Harstad. Erling Vidkunsson became the largest holder of noble estate in Norway. From his father, Vidkun Erlingsson (ca. 1260–1302), Erling inherited Bjarkøy and from his mother Gyrid Andresdottir, a descendant of the son of King Inge Stenkilsson of Sweden, he inherited land at Sudreim (Old Norse Suđrheimr) located at Sørum in Romerike. He inherited Giske from his uncle Bjarne Erlingsson (1250–1313) upon the death of that man's childless daughter Kristin who died young.

In 1319, Magnus IV of Sweden, a child three years old, succeeded to the Norwegian throne. A regency was set up for the young king, with Erling's regency extending from 1323-32. The regency-like system continued also because Magnus primarily resided not in Norway, but in neighboring Sweden. Magnus was acclaimed as hereditary king of Norway at the Haugating in Tønsberg in August 1319 under the regency of his mother, Ingeborg Håkonsdotter. In February 1323, the Norwegian regency council rebelled against Ingeborg. During the years 1323-31, Erling Vidkunsson led the Norwegian State Board of Royal Authority (norske riksstyret med kongelig myndighet) and held the title of drottsete until Magnus was declared to have come of age at 15.

By 1343, Norway desired to be more independent of Sweden. King Magnus agreed that his younger son, the future Haakon VI of Norway would be king of Norway. Although the young prince was nominally under regency of his father, Norway received a level of independence and the administration continued under Vidkunsson. Later when the young king was sent to Norway, Vidkunsson was to lead his education.

Many of Norway's highest nobles for the next three centuries would be descended from Erling Vidkunsson. Vidkunsson's only son Bjarne Erlingsson predeceased him. His inheritance was left to his daughters, of whom Ingeborg Erlingsdottir, who married Sigurd Havtoreson (1315-1392) received Giske. Gyrid Erlingsdottir married Eiliv Eilivsson of Naustdalsætten (Old Norse Naustdalr). It has been speculated that a third daughter, Gjertrud, married Otte Rømer, but this has not been established with certainty, as the surviving sources does not name the parents or patronym of Rømer's wife.

== See also ==
- Sudreim claim

== Other sources ==
- Boyesen, Hjalmar Hjorth The Story of Norway (1923)
