= Fief of Viborg =

Late medieval fiefdom

The Fief of Viborg (1320–1534) was for two centuries a late medieval fief (a slottslän) in the southeastern border of Finland and the entire Swedish realm. It was held by its chatelain, a fief-appointed feudal lord.

== History ==
=== Context ===
For extended periods, the medieval commanders of Viborg Castle (chatelains, castellans), on the border with the Republic of Novgorod, in practice functioned as margraves by collecting the crown's incomes from the fief in their own name and being entitled to keep them to defend the realm's eastern border. They enjoyed more independence than the kingdom's other castellans, "burgraves". However the fief of the castle and its county was not formally hereditary though almost all appointees were from certain families, related to the Bonde-Bååt-Haak family, which between the 1350s and the 1390s also held the Swedish titular version of the earldom of Orkney.

=== Founding, independence and duties ===
Castle fiefs in Finland (Slottslän)

The organization of that new territory for the Swedish realm took place between the 1290s and 1330s. The conquered Kexholm was lost, and the Neva River's Landskrona was destroyed catastrophically. There was then much sporadic warring for decades until 1323, but Viborg was held along with the coast westwards. When the conquest became established, a special fief was formed. Gotland had strong trade relations with coastal Karelia. Novgorod succeeded in maintaining its control of the Ladoga coast and the Neva River.

The independence and the privileges of the county were founded by the Joninpoika brothers. Squire Peter Jonsson (later knighted) and his elder brother Sir Sune Jonsson, Lord of Flishult, Royal Councillor, the lawspeaker of Tiohärad (in inland Småland), together with their close relative Charles, Bishop of Linköping, were allies of the new king, Magnus IV of Sweden, in 1320 or 1321 and purchased dominus Efflerus, the bailiff of the deposed king, Birger of Sweden, from Viborg Castle. They committed to keep the castle and its revenues for Charles until the purchase price had been compensated.

Their escutcheon depicted a boat, as was also depicted in arms of the so-called Bonde family and Snakenborg family and Bååt family and Puke family, and they were from a family that was originally from Småland, some of which then used the nickname Haak.

Lord Peter was set up as the fief-holder, and the whole clan participated in consolidating the fief. They also brought numbers of their Smålandic peasants to start farms in the county. There are toponymic indications of an influx of Southern-Swedish immigrants having settled in the vicinities of Viborg and on the coast westward to the Kymi River.

Peter and Sune recognized the new king and received important privileges, which effectively turned their holding of Viborg into an independent feudal fief, the start of a veritable margraviate.

The position of the fiefed chatelain was "to defend the castle and the county, to administer them, with freedom to organize the internal affairs of the county as it pleased them, to bear the revenues and use as it pleased...".

=== Power and wealth ===
They also grabbed immense wealth for the family. Sune's son Erengisle, Earl of Orkney was a recorded owner of Kymmenegård Manor, in Viborg Province, the spot on which the town of Kotka later became erected. Munkenäs, an immense domain in Vederlax, was owned first by Sten Turesson Bielke, Lord High Constable of Sweden, followed by his son Sten Stensson, Lord of Engsö.

All the Swedish negotiators of the Treaty of Nöteborg (1323), three years after the acquisition of Viborg, appear to be members of their extended family; representatives of Bishop Charles's diocese; or merchants of Gotland, part of the diocese. Its chatelains were generally from the most powerful families of the kingdom. They enjoyed large administrative powers and some distance from the capital. Those realities made them practically independent rulers. The position of the lord of Viborg became effectively independent. As such, it was desired by many powerful magnates. In the 1350s, it was held by Earl Erengisle's brother-in-law, the mighty kingmaker Nicholas Turesson, Lord of Kråkerum of the Bielke. He personally owned Kaukjärvi Domain, in the Karelian Isthmus, near Viborg.

They organised defences, guarded the area constantly, provided food and equipment, kept the fortress in shape, kept mercenaries and paid the military.

The direct-line Jonsson family ended in 1392 by the death of Earl Erengisle. However, the margraviate was, almost without exception, held by descendants or husbands of their extended family until its very end, after over two centuries.

Early margraves of Viborg created a petty nobility, knapadel, around their strategic points. More capable peasants with some roles as leaders in the local community were given tax exemption against guard duties of local strongholds, the somewhat primitive "linnavuori" fortresses. Cavalry service was not required from them for the frälse tax exemption. The petty nobility of Veckelax is particularly noted in literature as having been a notable example. Later margraves, such as Krister Nilsson and Charles Knutsson, refused to fully accept such families of the petty nobility.

=== Status as a frontier fiefdom ===
Apparently, the main reason for the chatelain of the Viborg Fief succeeding in keeping such an independent position, compared to other castles and their holders, was Viborg's extraordinary position as the easternmost outpost and the stronghold of the Swedish realm against the eastern neighbouring power from its attacks and desires to annex more land. Revenues from the fief were needed to defend the eastern border for what was usually understood as the government of the kingdom, and if the eastern defence was not granted sufficient resources, taxes from the western areas would possibly also have been lost to the enemy.

The fiefholders were also responsible for holding the northern border. In the 1470s, they established another castle, Olofsborg, over 100 km north of Viborg. During the whole Middle Ages, that fortress was kept under the command of Viborg.

Important personages who held Viipuri as their fief were Bo Jonsson Grip, Krister Nilsson Vasa (1417–42), Charles Knutsson Bonde (1442–48, the future king), Erik Axelsson Tott (1457–81), Knut Posse (1495–97), Sten Sture the Elder (particularly 1497-99 when he was personally in residence, between his regencies), Eric Bielke and Count John of Hoya.

Particularly in the 1440s and in the late 15th century, the fortresses of the Viborg Castle were further enlarged and built up.

=== Abolition ===
In 1534, King Gustav I of Sweden abolished the independent fief by deposing and exiling his brother-in-law John, Count of Hoya. Lord Nils Grabbe took Viborg Castle by force on behalf of the king and became its royal governor without gaining the feudal privileges that had been held by the earlier holders of the castle.

== List of fiefholders of the Viborg castle ==
This is to list all those medieval and 16th century lords who held Viipuri castle and its fief, as fiefed chatelains, in the independent way ("margrave") and not simply as governors or bailiffs. The list is incomplete, due to the scarcity of historical sources and thus gaps.

In 1320, lord Peter Jonsson (Haak) purchased the castle and its dominions from the bailiff Efflerus set there by the deposed king Birger.

- 1320–1338 (or later), Peter Jonsson (and in c 1336 he was governor of all Finland)
- 1340, Dan Niklasson
- c. 1348, Gerhard Skytte
- 1357–1364, Nils Turesson Bielke, kingdom's Lord High Justiciar, son-in-law of Peter Jonsson's brother
- 1360s, Nils' heirs, as pawn.
- 1370, King Albrekt
- 1371–1386, Bo Jonsson Grip (all Finland), Lord High Justiciar
- 1386–1399, Karl Ulfsson, Lord of Tofta, kingdom's Lord High Constable, stepson of a niece of Peter Jonsson
- 1403–1417, Tord Bonde, Lord High Constable, distant cousin of Peter Jonsson
- 1417–1442, Kristiern, Krister Nilsson Vaasa, Lord High Justiciar, brother-in-law of Tord Bonde
- 1440–1448, Karl, Charles Knutsson, Lord of Fogelvik (1408–1470), Lord High Constable, grandson of Karl Ulfsson and of Tord Bonde, became in 1448, The Crown
- 1457–1481, Erik Akselsson Tott (c.1420–1487), great-grandson of Tord Bonde, son of a first cousin of Charles Knutsson
- 1481, Lars, Laurens Axelsen Thott, brother of previous
- 1483, Ivar, Iver Axelsen Thott, Overlord of Gotland, brother of previous, son-in-law of Charles Knutsson
- 1483–1495, Sten Sture the Elder, Kingdom's Regent, nephew of Charles Knutsson, great-grandson of Karl Ulfsson, and great-great-great-grandnephew of Nils Turesson
  - his deputy: Nils Eriksson Gyllenstierna, grandson of Charles Knutsson
- 1495–1496, Knut, Knut Posse (d. 1500)
- 1497–1501, again Sten Sture the Elder (1440–1503), between his terms as Regent of Sweden
- 1499–May, 1511 Erik Turesson Bielke (d. 1511), great-great-grandnephew of Nils Turesson
- 1511–1513, Gunilla Johansdotter Bese, widow of Eric Bielke, her predecessor
- 1513–1520, Tony Eriksson Tott, son-in-law of the two previous, great-nephew of Erik Akselsson, Laurens and Ivar of Gotland
- 1525–1534, Johan, Count of Hoya and Bruchhausen (d. 1535), son-in-law of Sten Sture's nephew, brother-in-law of the reigning king Gustav I.

In 1534, Gustav I of Sweden, Sten Sture's grandnephew, abolished the independent fief.

Lord Nicholas Grabbe was the next commander of the Viipuri castle, 1534–45, but he did not receive the feudal privileges held by earlier chatelains.

== See also ==
- Viipuri Province
