= Bielke =

Swedish noble family

Coat of arms of the Swedish Bielke family.

Bielke is the name of an ancient and powerful Swedish noble family, originally from Småland.

== History ==
The family was first mentioned in the 13th century. (Note: Swedish nobility did not use the practice of including family names in personal names until the late 16th century. The name was originally derived from the traditional family coat of arms and has been applied posthumously to earlier noble ancestors as well. In such cases, the family name is usually written in parentheses.) It is the second-oldest such family still in existence after Natt och Dag. The comital family branch, descended from the first Count Nils Bielke af Åkerö (1644–1716), is still extant, while the baronial branch became extinct in the male line with the death of Johan Ture Bielke in 1792.

Members of the family include:

- Ture Turesson (Bielke) (1425–1489/1490), Swedish Privy Councillor, Lord High Constable
- Erik Turesson (Bielke) (d. 1511), Swedish Privy Councillor, Castellan of Vyborg Castle
- Anna Eriksdotter (Bielke) (1490–1525), Swedish noblewoman and acting castellan of Kalmar Castle, daughter of Erik Turesson
- Gunilla Bielke (1568–1597), Queen of Sweden, consort of King John III of Sweden
- Nils Turesson Bielke (1569–1639), Swedish statesman
- Nils Bielke (1644–1716), Swedish Count, German Reichsgraf of Torgelow, Field Marshal and Governor-General of Pomerania
- Carl Gustaf Bielke (1683–1754), Count and book collector, Governor of Västernorrland County
- Sten Carl Bielke (1709–1753), Baron, judge and botanist, co-founder of the Royal Swedish Academy of Sciences
- Nils Adam Bielke (1724–1792), Count, Privy Councillor and Marshal of the Realm
- Johan Ture Bielke (1742–1792), Baron, son of Sten Carl Bielke, co-conspirator in the murder of King Gustav III of Sweden
- Nils Bielke (1792–1845), Count and courtier, Gentleman of the Bedchamber for the King of Sweden

== See also ==
- Don Bielke (1932–2023), American basketball player
- René Bielke (born 1962), German ice hockey player
- Finn Bjelke (born 1959), Norwegian humourist, writer, music journalist and radio host
