= Victoria Åberg =

Finnish artist (1824–1892)

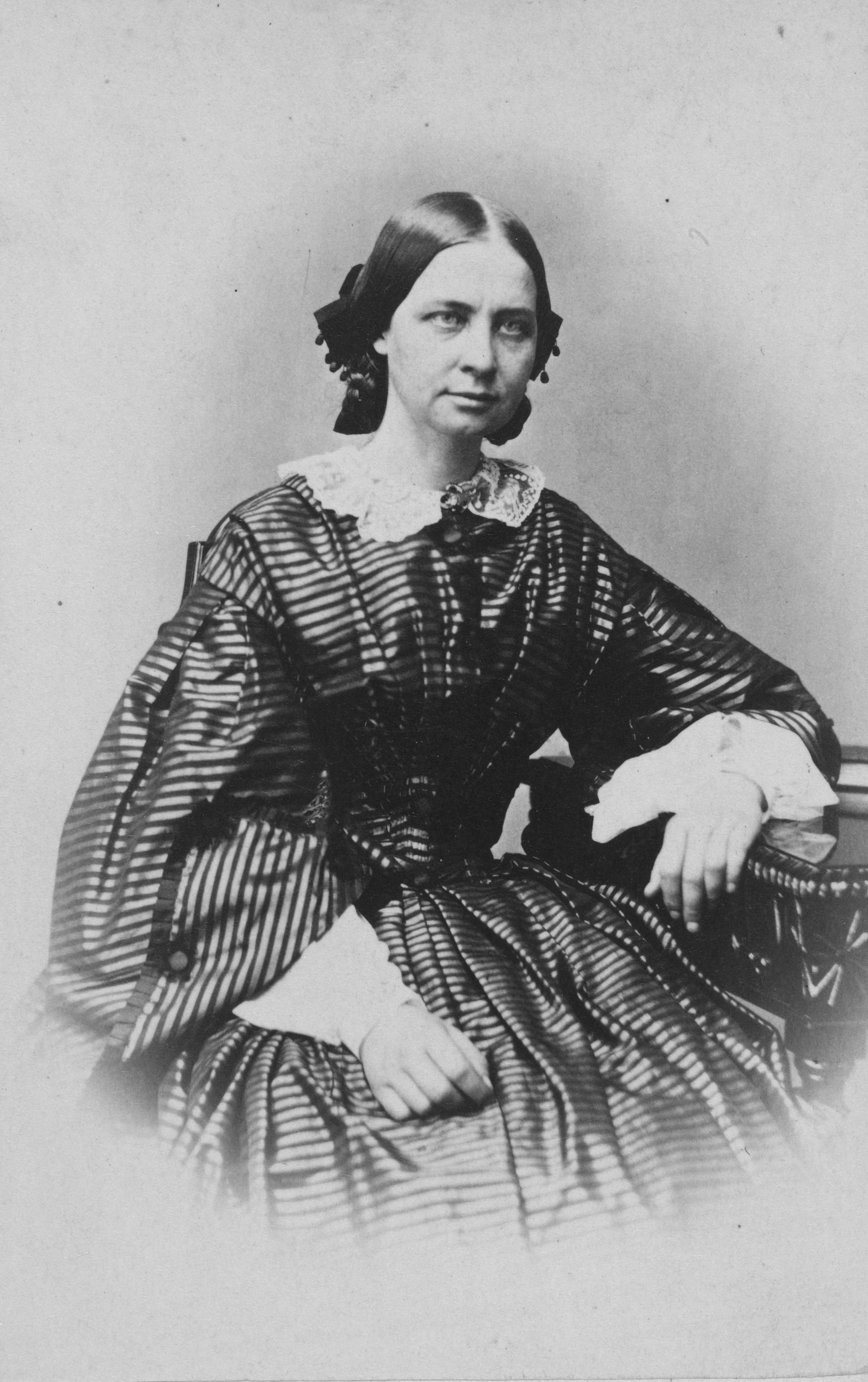
- Åberg (c. 1860s)
- Born: Ulrika Victoria Åberg; 24 February 1824; Loviisa, Grand Duchy of Finland
- Died: 15 July 1892 (aged 68); Weimar, Germany
- Movement: Düsseldorf school of painting
- Awards: Dukaattipalkinto (1861); First Class Artist (1866)

Victoria Åberg (24 February 1824 – 15 July 1892) was a Finnish landscape painter in the Düsseldorf tradition, notable as one of the first Finnish women to achieve a sustained professional career as an artist.

== Education ==
Åberg began training at the Finnish Art Society Drawing School (Suomen Taideyhdistyksen Piirustuskoulu) as part of its first cohort in its opening year, 1848. Afterwards she continued her studies first in Düsseldorf under Hans Gude, and later, funded by a state stipend, in Dresden and Weimar throughout the late 1850s and early 1860s.

== Career ==
Åberg's public debut came in 1849.

Alongside her artistic pursuits, Åberg worked as a secondary school arts teacher from the mid-1840s until early 1860s.

After that, she lived and worked outside of Finland — mostly in Germany, but also spending some years in Italy — more or less continuously from the mid-1860s onwards, at least in part because she felt that her Düsseldorfer work was not sufficiently appreciated in her home country.

== Awards and honours ==
In 1861, Åberg was only the second artist to win first prize in the Finnish Art Society's Ducat Contest.

In 1866, she was awarded the honorary title of First Class Artist by the Imperial Academy of Arts of St Petersburg.

== Gallery ==
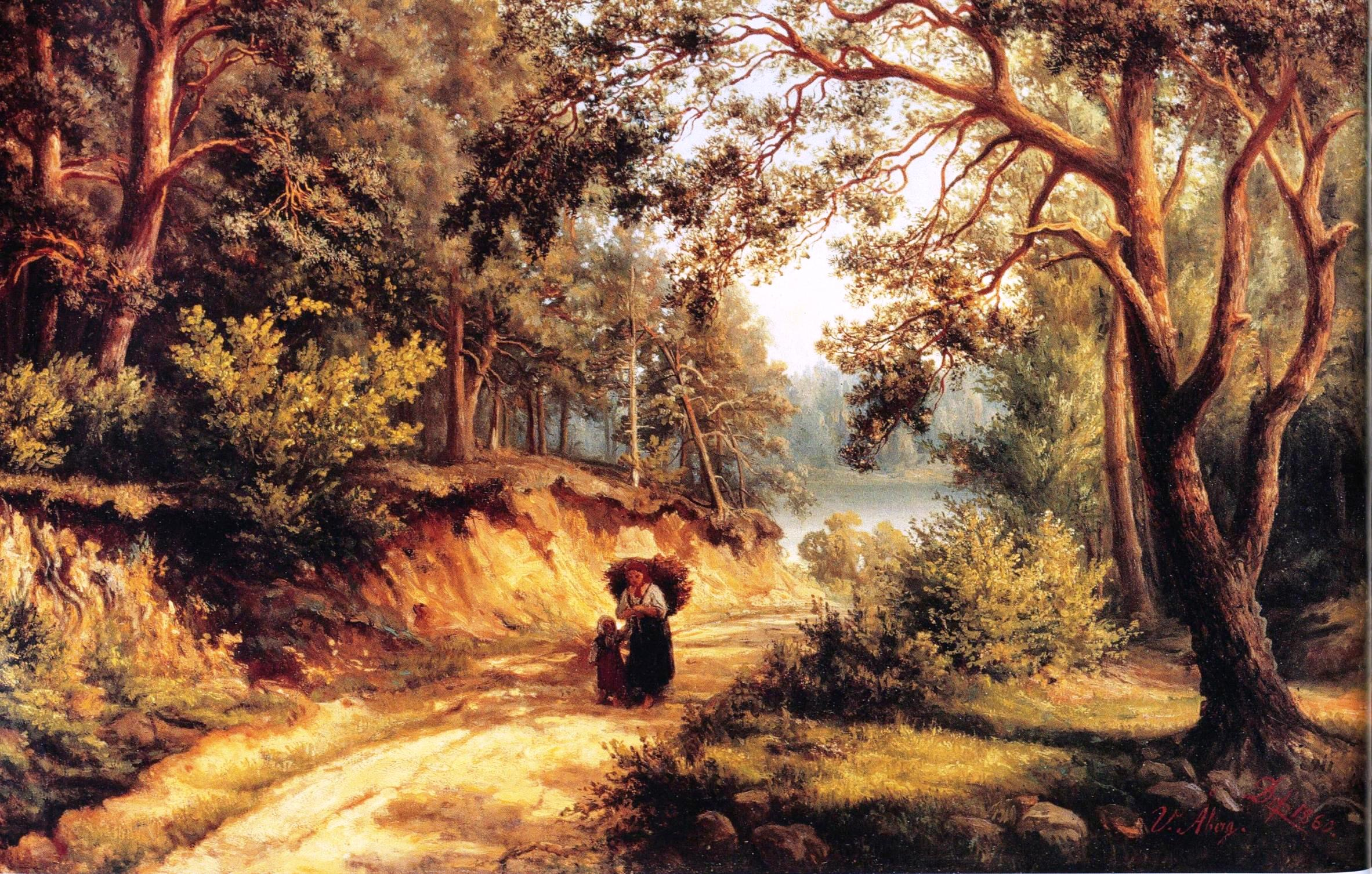
Saksalainen maisema, (lit. 'German landscape') (1860)

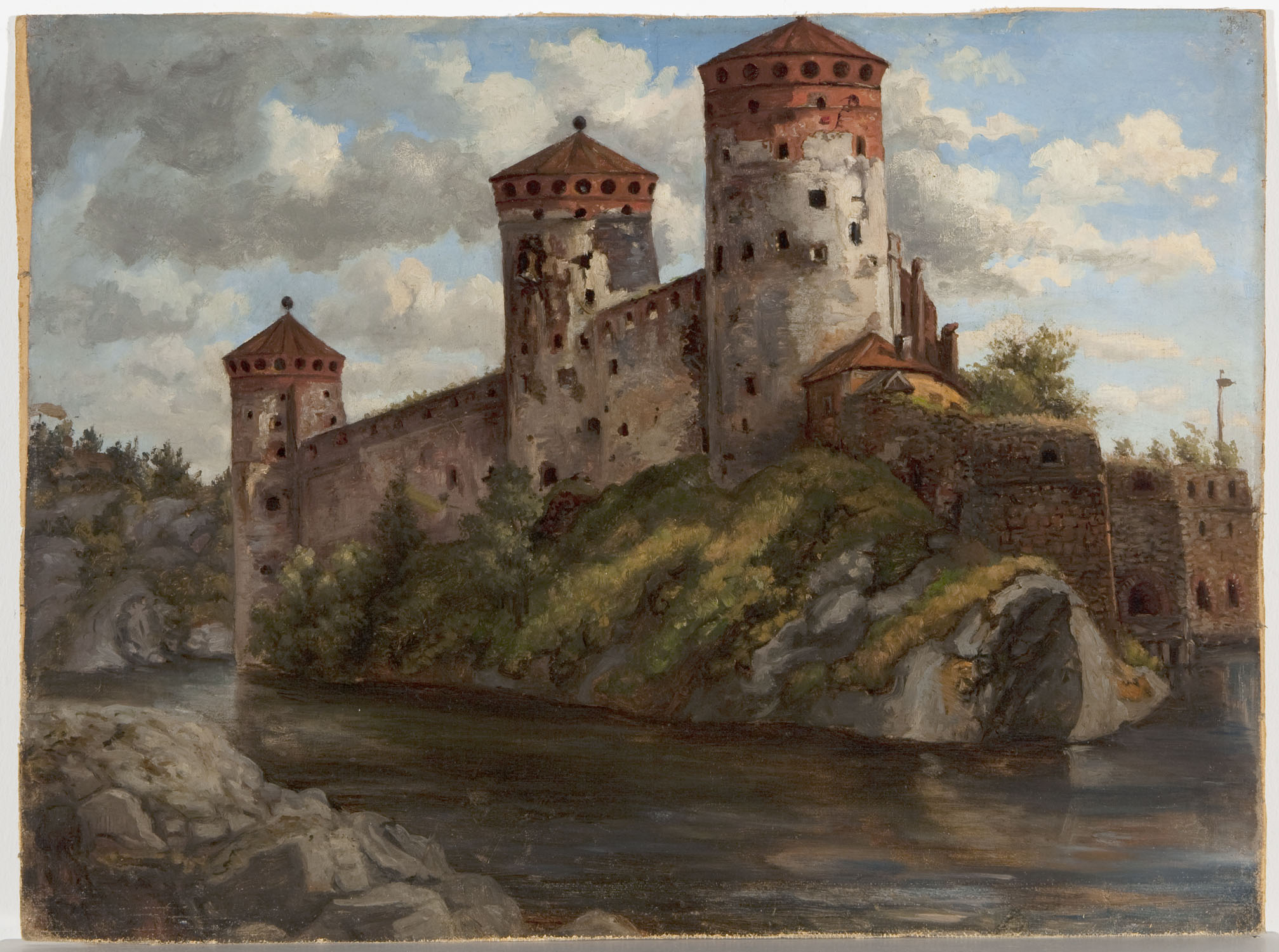
Olavinlinna (undated)

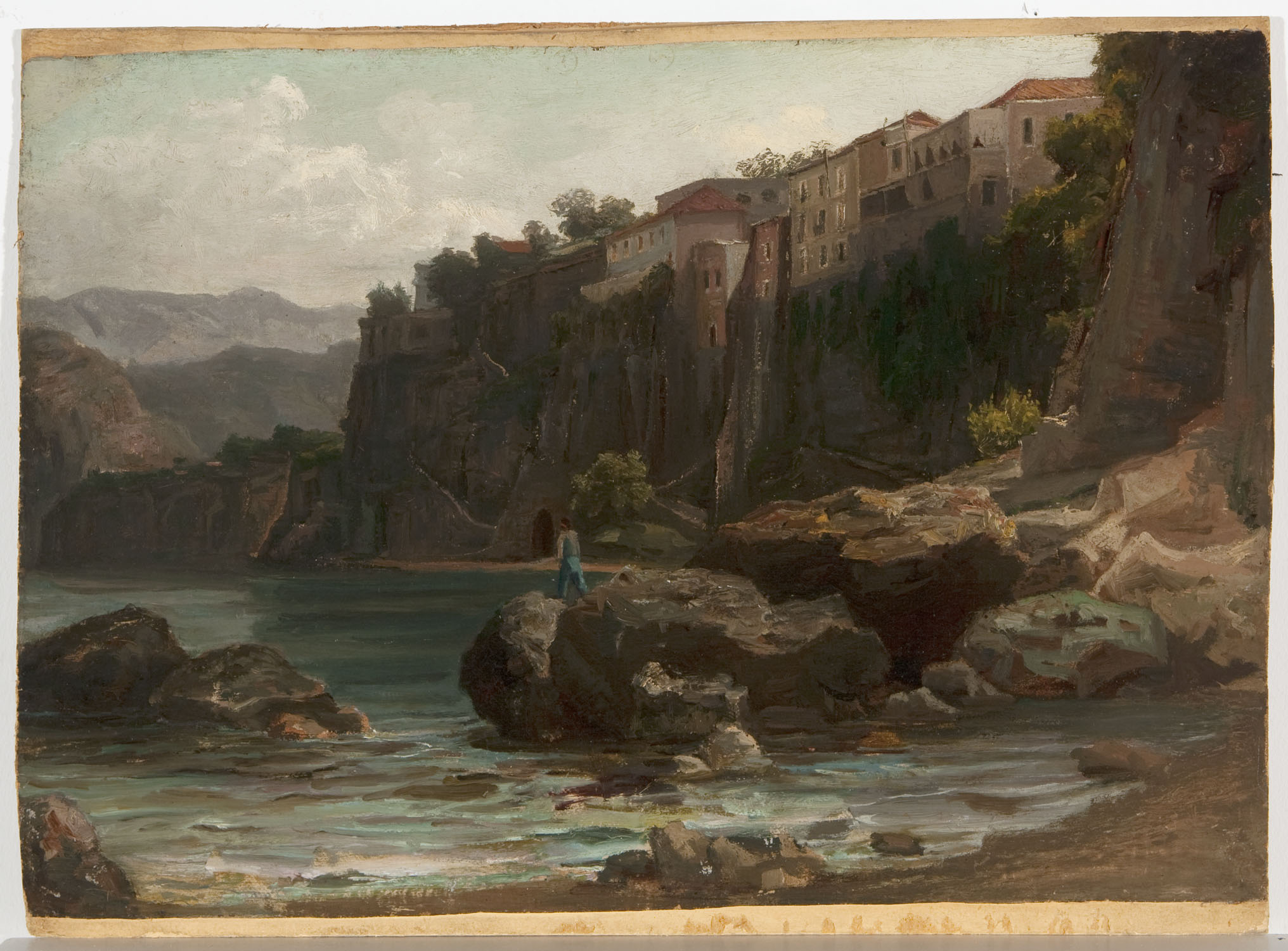
Jokimaisema (lit. 'River view') (after 1868)
