= Nils Bielke's campaign against the Ottoman Empire =

Swedish auxiliary conflict

- Part of the Great Turkish War
Date	1684–1687
Location	Central Europe, Eastern Europe
Result	Imperial-Swedish victory: Allied victory in the Great Turkish War

Belligerents
Holy Roman Empire; Swedish auxiliary forces under Nils Bielke	Ottoman Empire

Commanders and leaders
Nils Bielke	Sarı Süleyman Pasha; Yeğen Osman Pasha

Strength
~2,000	Unknown

Nils Bielke's campaign against the Ottoman Empire (1684–1687) was an event in which Swedish auxiliary forces, serving under the Holy Roman Empire, participated in the Great Turkish War. Bielke led approximately 2,000 Swedish soldiers as support to the Habsburg army in Hungary, engaging in several battles against the Ottoman forces, most notably at the Battle of Mohács in 1687.

== Background ==
The Great Turkish War (1683–1699) was a major conflict between the Ottoman Empire and a coalition of European powers known as the Holy League, which included the Holy Roman Empire, Poland-Lithuania, Venice, and later Russia. The war was sparked by the Ottoman siege of Vienna in 1683, which marked the height of Ottoman expansion into Central Europe. Following the failure of this siege, the European powers began a counteroffensive aimed at pushing the Ottomans back.

Although Sweden was not a formal member of the Holy League and had no direct conflict with the Ottoman Empire, the Swedish Crown permitted a number of its soldiers to serve as auxiliary troops under the Holy Roman Emperor Leopold I. This was part of a broader diplomatic strategy: Sweden sought to maintain influence in European affairs and to strengthen its political ties with the Habsburgs, especially during a period of relative peace in Northern Europe.

One of the key figures in this Swedish involvement was Count Nils Bielke, a Swedish nobleman and military officer. As a trusted ally of the emperor, Bielke was placed in command of around 2,000 Swedish troops who joined the imperial army in its campaign against the Ottomans in Hungary. These troops were not officially deployed by the Swedish state, but rather served under foreign command with the Crown's blessing. Their role reflected Sweden's complex position in European politics during the late 17th century: officially neutral, but still actively engaged in the balance of power through diplomatic and military channels.

== Nils Bielke ==
Count Nils Bielke (1644–1716) was a prominent Swedish nobleman, diplomat, and military officer during the late 17th century. Born into a powerful aristocratic family, he quickly rose through the ranks of the Swedish military and gained a reputation for his strategic skill and loyalty to the Crown. His career extended beyond Sweden, as he was also a key figure in Swedish diplomacy and represented the country at various European courts.

During the Great Turkish War, Bielke was appointed to command the Swedish auxiliary corps that supported the Holy Roman Empire. Although Sweden was officially neutral, King Charles XI allowed Bielke to lead approximately 2,000 Swedish troops into Hungary, where they joined the Habsburg campaign against the Ottoman Empire. Bielke held the rank of "Generalfeldwachtmeister" (a rank similar to major general in the imperial army), and his leadership was recognized by Emperor Leopold I, who saw him as a valuable ally.

Under Bielke's command, the Swedish troops participated in several military operations alongside imperial forces. His most notable contribution came during the Battle of Mohács in 1687, a decisive victory for the Habsburgs that significantly weakened Ottoman control in Central Europe. Although Bielke's forces were relatively small, they played a symbolic and tactical role in the campaign, demonstrating Sweden's capacity to project military influence even outside of its traditional sphere.

After the campaign, Bielke returned to Sweden, where he continued to serve in high-ranking military and diplomatic positions. His career reflects the complex interplay between national loyalty and international ambition in 17th-century Europe, and his participation in the Great Turkish War stands as a unique chapter in Swedish military history.

== Aftermath ==
Following the campaign in Hungary, Nils Bielke and the Swedish auxiliary corps returned home. Although their participation in the Great Turkish War was relatively short and limited in scale, it had broader diplomatic and symbolic significance. For the Holy Roman Empire, the support of foreign troops like the Swedes helped strengthen the perception of a united Christian front against the Ottoman Empire. For Sweden, the intervention allowed the country to remain influential in European affairs without formally entering the war.

Bielke himself continued to serve in important roles after the campaign. He was appointed Field Marshal and held diplomatic posts, including as ambassador to France. However, his relationship with King Charles XI became strained over time, partly due to disagreements over foreign policy and Bielke's strong connections to continental courts. Eventually, he fell out of favor and was politically sidelined.

The Swedish involvement in the Great Turkish War is often overlooked in broader historical narratives, but it remains a unique example of how Sweden, despite its official neutrality, maneuvered diplomatically and militarily in the complex power struggles of 17th-century Europe. Nils Bielke's leadership stands as a testament to Sweden's once-prominent role on the European stage, even in conflicts far beyond its borders.

== See also ==
- Great Turkish War
- Battle of Mohács
- Nils Bielke
