= Treaty of Nöteborg =

1323 treaty between Sweden and Novgorod

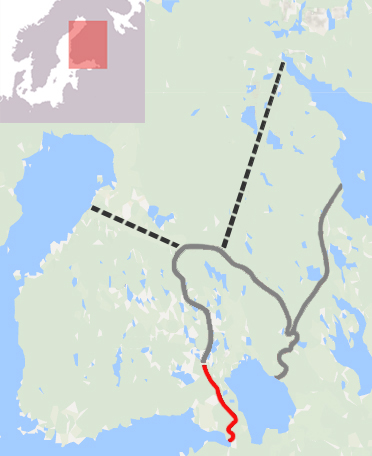
- The two-branched border as defined in the treaty, according to John H. Lind and Jarl Gallén. Shown in red the undisputed section of the border, shown in black dotted line the two branches of the border and in gray the border that was in use in the 16th century.
- Type: Peace treaty
- Signed: 12 August 1323
- Location: Oreshek
- Parties: Novgorod Republic; Kingdom of Sweden
- Language: Latin, Russian, Swedish

The Treaty of Nöteborg, also known as the Treaty of Oreshek or the Treaty of Pähkinäsaari, (Note: Swedish: Freden i Nöteborg; Russian: Ореховский мир; Finnish: Pähkinäsaaren rauha) was the peace treaty signed at Oreshek Fortress (Swedish: Nöteborg; Finnish: Pähkinälinna) on 12 August 1323. It was the first agreement between Sweden and the Novgorod Republic regulating their border on the Karelian Isthmus and parts of modern-day Finland. Three years later, Novgorod signed the Treaty of Novgorod with the Norwegians.

The border between Sweden and Russia did not change until the signing of the Treaty of Teusina in 1595, as all future Russian–Swedish treaties until then confirmed the border.

== Name ==
At the time, the treaty had no distinguishing name. The chronicle of Novgorod reports the conclusion of "everlasting peace" with the Swedish king in 1323, and that the treaty was concluded "on the old terms" (po staroy poshline), although the available Russian text of the treaty contains no references to previous similar treaties. In the 15th and 16th century sources, it is referred to as the letter between Prince Yury and King Magnus.

Treaty of Nöteborg is a direct translation of the Swedish Nöteborgsfreden. The name is modern: prior to the late eighteenth century, Swedish historians did not know where the treaty had been concluded, as the location was recorded only in Russian chronicles. The Russian term for the treaty, directly translated into English, is the Peace of Orekhov or Peace of Oreshek (Russian: Ореховский мир, romanized: Orekhovsky mir). The Swedish Nöteborg and the Russian Orekhov are names for Oreshek Fortress in Shlisselburg. Pähkinäsaari is the Finnish name for the island on which the fortress was built.

== Background ==
In the mid-13th century, Sweden consolidated its rule over Tavastia and proceeded to expand into western Karelia in order to control the waterways between Lake Ladoga and the Gulf of Finland. The Novgorod Republic, a Russian city-state, relied on these waterways for its trade with Western Europe. After Sweden gained full control of the western outlet of the Vuoksi River in 1293, it founded the fortress of Viborg. Subsequent attempts to seize Kexholm and secure Swedish control over the newly founded fortress of Landskrone, at the mouth of the Okhta River, were repulsed in 1294 and 1300, respectively. The Novgorodians demolished the latter fortress in 1301. In 1322, the Swedes made another attempt to control Kexholm, while the Novgorodians unsuccessfully attempted to drive them out of Viborg. The following year, the Novgorodians erected the fortress of Oreshek, where the two parties met and agreed to conclude a treaty to end hostilities.

== Contents ==
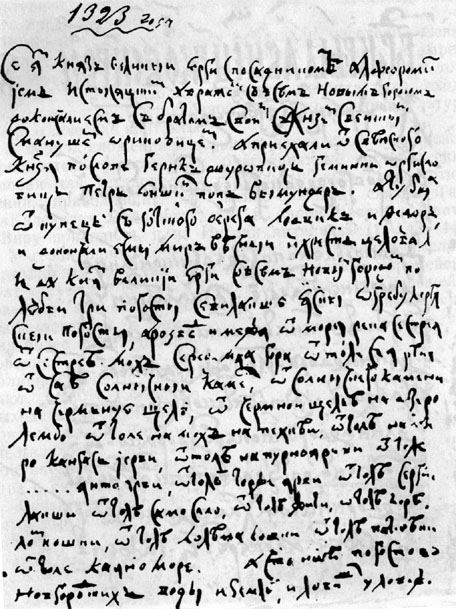
Russian copy of the treaty

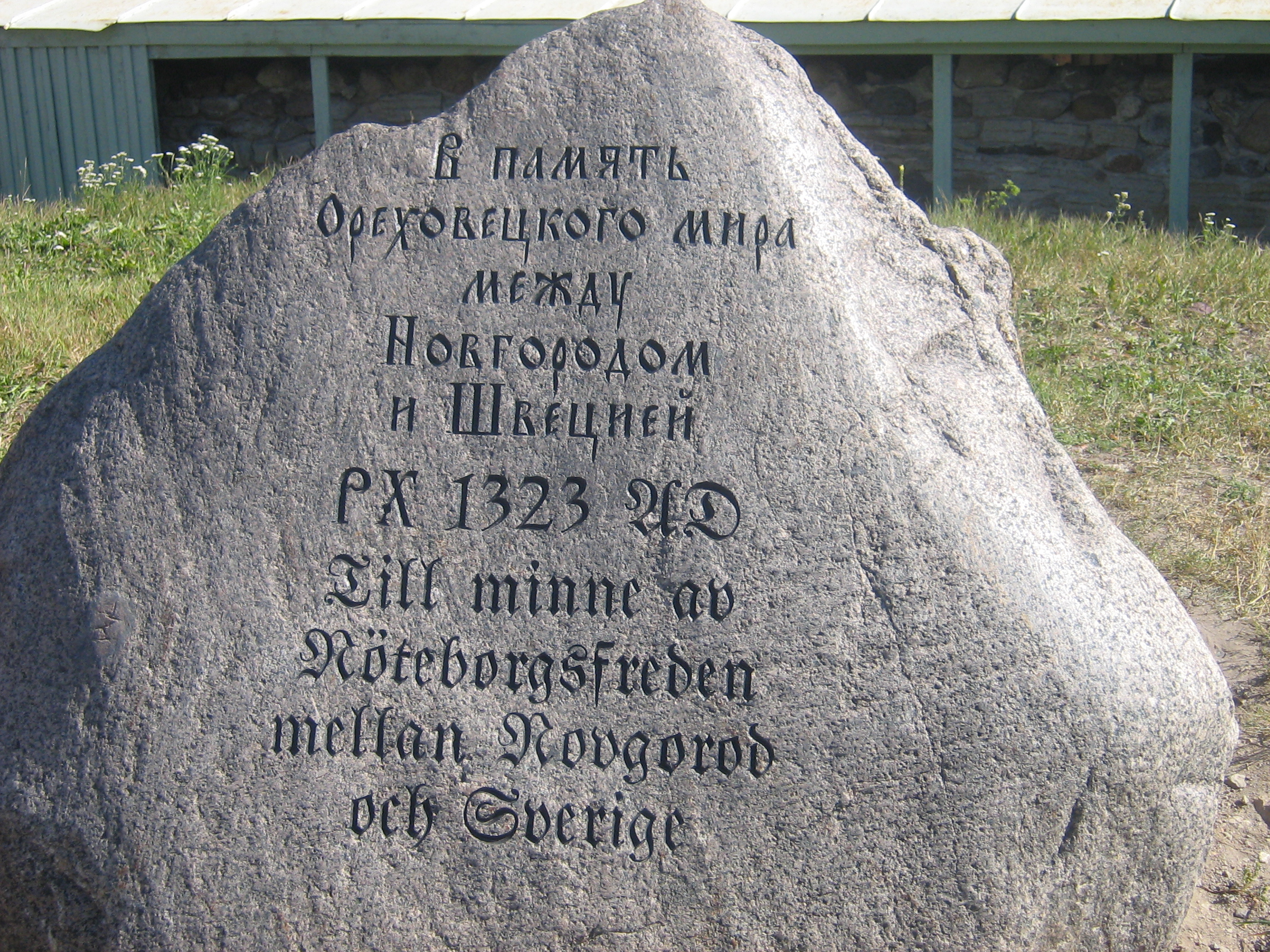
Peace Memorial at Pähkinäsaari

The original documents of the treaty no longer exist, but copies exist in Russian, Swedish, and Latin. When the treaty was concluded, each party received a version of the treaty. The Swedish side received a Russian-language version accompanied by a Latin translation; these documents are believed to have been destroyed in the fire of the Tre Kronor Castle, but their texts are preserved in copies. Novgorod, in contrast, seems to have received a Swedish-language version, which was copied by Swedish envoys in 1537. The original was lost, possibly during the Time of Troubles, but the copy survived in Stockholm. The versions differ from each other in some respects.

The Russian text mentions the usual signatories, including the posadnik (mayor) Varfolomey Yuryevich, the tysyatsky (chiliarch) Avram, as well as Yury of Moscow, who was serving as the prince of Novgorod at the time. The seven-year-old Swedish king Magnus Eriksson was represented by the Swedish lords Erik Turesson and Hemming Ødgislason, the chatelain of Viborg Peter Jonsson, and the priest Waemundus. Two merchants from Gotland represented the Hanseatic League.

The border was defined by a list of 18 border points. The southern part of the border close to Viborg was considered the most important part of the treaty and was clearly defined with twelve border points, which divided the Karelian Isthmus in half. The border began from south of Viborg Castle, followed the Sestra and Volchya Rivers north to Vuoksi, and continued northwest to its last unambiguous point at Särkilahti on Lake Saimaa. Under the treaty, Novgorod ceded the three pogosts (parishes) of Savilahti (in present-day Mikkeli), Jääski and Äyräpää to Sweden.

The border further north, away from important settlements, was defined more vaguely, with the remaining six border points extending across the sparsely populated area of Finland. The identification of these points has been long debated. The names of the points coincide with each other in the surviving copies of treaty, except for the final one, which is described in Swedish as nor i haffuit ("north into the sea"), in Russian as Kajano more and in Latin as Helsingh haff.

== Interpretations ==
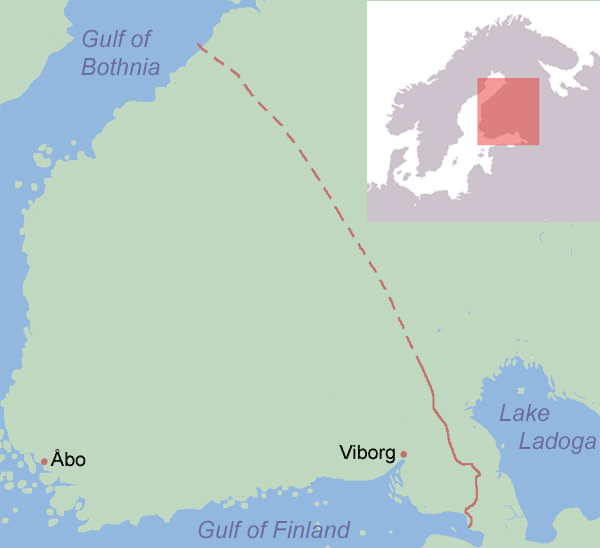
The border according to the Gulf of Bothnia theory

The nature and exact course of the border have been subjects of intense historical debate.

Nineteenth-century historians generally viewed the 1323 border as a sharply defined line separating the two states. According to the then-dominant interpretation, the border ran northward from the Gulf of Finland through Kainuu. The phrase "north into the sea" was understood as referring either to the White Sea or to the Arctic Ocean.

In 1925, the Finnish medievalist Jalmari Jaakkola challenged this view, arguing instead that the border ran northwest toward the coast of the Gulf of Bothnia. This interpretation became the dominant view for half a century, during which the debate centered on the identification of specific border markers. The northern end point was generally identified with the river Pyhäjoki. Ethnologist Kustaa Vilkuna suggested the border followed an ancient Karelian trading route consisting of a chain of lakes and rivers, a view later developed by historian Heikki Kirkinen.

In the late 1960s, Jarl Gallén discovered fourteenth-century Swedish border lists that consistently described a more easterly line. Building on Gallén's findings, the Danish historian John Lind proposed in the 1990s that the treaty originally defined two distinct borders. According to this interpretation, a broad zone of common land in northern Ostrobothnia and Lapland lay between the western Novgorodian limit and the eastern Swedish limit, and could be exploited by both powers.

== Aftermath ==
Finnic tribes living on both sides of the border had no say in the treaty. Sweden and Novgorod had already established their respective de facto control over their areas of influence in eastern Fennoscandia, with Karelians under Novgorodian rule and the western tribes under Swedish rule. The attempted "permanent peace" established by the treaty did not last for long. The northern part of the border crossed wide stretches of wilderness which later on became the center of contention between Sweden and Novgorod. Within five years from the treaty being signed, Swedish colonists started making inroads into northern Ostrobothnia. Sweden established castles at Uleåborg circa 1375 and Olofsborg in 1475. These fortresses were clearly on the Novgorodian side of the established border.

As the border cut through the heartland of the Karelians, Novgorod relied on Lithuanian service princes to strengthen its hold on its share of Karelia. These service princes relied on contributions from the local population (due to a system known as kormleniye), which did not make Novgorodian governance any more popular. Despite this, Novgorod did not make serious attempts at Christianizing the Karelian population. However, by 1337, some Karelians attempted to extend Sweden's area of control to the east, and in Korelsky Gorodok, a local uprising called for Swedish intervention and led to the killing of Russian merchants and all Christians in general. In 1339, after two years of fighting, Sweden and Novgorod renewed the treaty, but with an additional clause following a Novgorodian demand:

If our Karelians escape to you, then kill or hang them; if yours escape to us we will do likewise, so that they shall not cause enmity between us. Those, however, who have been baptized in our faith we shall not hand over, but there are only a few left, since they are all dead due to the wrath of God.

Border conflicts continued as Finnish settlement expanded north and east of the demarcation line. The Swedish king Magnus Eriksson launched another crusade to the Neva region in 1348 after the Novgorodians refused to attend a theological debate or embrace his religion. The fortress of Oreshek was captured and Magnus proceeded to baptize the Izhorians; however the Swedes were unable to hold it. Despite this, the boundary with Russia did not change until the signing of the Treaty of Teusina in 1595.

== See also ==
- Birkarls
- List of treaties

== Bibliography ==
- Feldbrugge, Ferdinand J. M. (22 November 2021). "The Treaties of Medieval Russia — A Survey". In Feldbrugge, Ferdinand J. M.; Clark, Roger; Pomorski, Stanislaw (eds.). International and National Law in Russia and Eastern Europe: Essays in honor of George Ginsburgs. BRILL. ISBN 978-90-04-48076-6.
- Gallén, Jarl (1968). Nöteborgsfreden och Finlands medeltida östgräns. 1. Skrifter utgivna av Svenska litteratursällskapet i Finland (in Swedish). Helsinki: Society of Swedish Literature in Finland. ISSN 0039-6842.
- Gallén, Jarl; Lind, John H. (1991). Nöteborgsfreden och Finlands medeltida östgräns. 2. Skrifter utgivna av Svenska litteratursällskapet i Finland (in Swedish). Helsinki: Society of Swedish Literature in Finland. ISSN 0039-6842.
- Gallén, Jarl; Lind, John H. (1991). Nöteborgsfreden och Finlands medeltida östgräns. 3, Kartbilaga. Skrifter utgivna av Svenska litteratursällskapet i Finland (in Swedish). Helsinki: Society of Swedish Literature in Finland. ISSN 0039-6842.
- Katajala, Kimmo (2012). "Drawing Borders or Dividing Lands?: the peace treaty of 1323 between Sweden and Novgorod in a European context". Scandinavian Journal of History. 37 (1): 23–48. doi:10.1080/03468755.2011.643543. ISSN 0346-8755.
- Lind, John H. (2000). Bekker-Nielsen, Hans (ed.). "The Russian–Swedish Border according to the Peace Treaty of Nöteborg (Orekhovets-Pähkinälinna) and the Political Status of the Northern Part of Fennoscandia". Mediaeval Scandinavia. 13. Odense University Press: 100–117.
- Lind, John H. (2017). "Consequences of the Baltic Crusades in Target Areas: The Case of Karelia". In Murray, Alan V. (ed.). Crusade and Conversion on the Baltic Frontier 1150–1500. Routledge. ISBN 978-1-351-94715-2.
- Osipov, Yu. S., ed. (2014). "Ореховский мир". Большая российская энциклопедия. Том 24: Океанариум — Оясио (in Russian). Большая российская энциклопедия. pp. 402–403. ISBN 978-5-85270-361-3. Archived from the original on 25 April 2026.
- Paul, Michael C. (2016). "Archbishop Vasilii Kalika of Novgorod, the Fortress of Orekhov and the Defence of Orthodoxy". In Murray, Alan V. (ed.). The Clash of Cultures on the Medieval Baltic Frontier. Routledge. pp. 253–272. ISBN 978-0-7546-6483-3.
- Sarviaho, Samu (2017). Ikuinen rauha : vuoden 1323 Pähkinäsaaren rauha suomalaisessa historiantutkimuksessa ja historiakulttuurissa 1800- ja 1900-luvuilla [Eternal Peace: the 1323 Peace of Pähkinäsaari in Finnish historical scholarship and historical culture in the 19th and 20th centuries] (PhD thesis). University of Oulu.
