= Jarl Gallén =

Finnish historian (1908–1990)

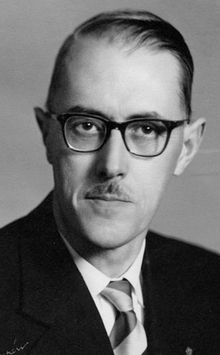

Jarl Wilhelm Erik Gallén (23 May 1908 – 27 March 1990) was a Finnish historian and Swedish-speaking professor in history at Helsinki University from 1964 to 1975.

== Biography ==
Gallén was born in Helsinki in 1908. He had an interest in history from a young age. Gallén became a student in 1925, bachelor of philosophy in 1929, master of arts in 1932, licentiate in 1946 and doctor in 1947. During his studies he converted to Catholicism and founded Academicum Catholicum, of which he was president from 1936 to 1946. He took an active part in debates on ideology and politics and helped found the Aktiva studentförbundet student society, and served as editor of the student newspaper Studentbladet from 1930 to 1932, where he made a name for himself as a pugnacious and combative right-wing debater.

In the 1930s, Gallén became an active member of the White Guard, and during the war he advanced to the rank of major. During the Winter War, he was first a reconnaissance officer and then Infantry Regiment 10's regimental aide-de-camp. In the latter role he made a decisive contribution to the whole regiment. Between the wars he was on active service and during the Continuation War he was regimental officer and battalion commander in Infantry Regiment 55 and Infantry Regiment 13 on Hanko Headland, Aunus and the Karelian Isthmus. His service was given the highest marks.

From 1947 to 1948, Gallén studied at the University of Fribourg, and in 1950 he became a lecturer in history at the University of Helsinki and in 1964 a professor. He was a member of various learned societies, such as the Royal Norwegian Society of Sciences and Letters and the Finnish Military Science Association (Sotatieteellinen Seura), and a large number of associations and working groups. From 1970 to 1981, he was the editor of Historisk Tidskrift för Finland.

Gallén was a convert to Catholicism. He died in Helsinki in 1990.

== Area of study ==
Gallén's specialty was the Middle Ages, particularly the Dominican Order's history in the Nordic counties, but he also wrote about the modern history of war. His most notable work is about the treaty of Nöteborg and the medieval eastern frontier of Finland, Nöteborgsfreden och Finlands medeltida östgräns (1968), as well as La province de Dacia on the Dominican province Dacia.

One of Gallén's thesis is that he holds it as unlikely that the Swedes made a crusade to Finland 1249–1250 from a political point of view, because of a serious power struggle with Norway at the time. The Second Swedish Crusade he dates to the years of 1238 or 1239, which is more likely because that the papal bulla of crusade stems from 1237.

A couple of his works on war history have been highly acclaimed for their expertise and lively style. He was highly regarded both in Finland and abroad as a scholar of Finnish and Nordic medieval history.

== Jarl Gallén Prize ==
The Jarl Gallén Prize is a prize for medievalists with a focus on Northern European history, awarded every three years. Winners have included Sverre Bagge, Monika Hedlund, Anders Andrén, Lars Boje Mortensen, Lena Liepe, and Stephen Mitchell.

== Bibliography ==
- Nations-praktika för nylänningar (in Swedish). Helsinki: Nylands Nation. 1931. OCLC 58253120.
- Tionde regementet: Karhula-Sommee-Viborgska viken (in Swedish). Helsinki: Söderströms Förlag. 1940. OCLC 837149574., 2nd ed. 1941 OCLC 58118962
- La province de Dacie de l'Ordre des Frères Prêcheurs 1 : Histoire générale jusqu'au grand schisme (Thesis) (in French). Söderströms Förlag. 1946. OCLC 13541168.
- Tre bataljoner: Infanteriregementet 13 på Karelska näset sommaren 1944 (in Swedish). Helsinki: Söderströms Förlag. 1949., 2nd ed. 1950, new facsimile ed. 1987, 1988
- Sankt Erik konung (in Swedish). with Tryggve Lundén. Stockholm: Svenska katolska akademie. 1960. OCLC 1292675420.
- Kulturhistoriskt lexikon för nordisk medeltid från vikingatid till reformationstid (in Swedish). Vol. 10–22. Helsinki: Akademiska bokhandeln. 1965–1978. Gallén was a member of the Finnish editorial board.
- Finlands svenska litteratur 1: Från medeltiden till Åboromantiken (in Swedish). With Lars Huldén, Olof Enckell, and Erik Ekelund. Helsinki: Söderströms Förlag. 1968. OCLC 186076574.
- Nöteborgsfreden och Finlands medeltida östgräns (in Swedish). Helsinki: Society of Swedish Literature in Finland. 1968. ISBN 9789519018683. New edition 1991
- Finlands väg mot självständigheten: Bandupptagning av två föredrag hållna vid Arbetets vänner huvudföreningens månadsmöten den 12 november och 10 december 1967 (in Swedish). Helsinki: Arbetets Vänner Huvudföreningen. 1969. OCLC 257220633.
- "Kring franciskanerna i Kökar: bakgrund och sammanhang". Historia bland öar och skär: Historicus r.f:s och Historiska föreningens i Stockholm seminarium i Egentliga Finland och på Åland 22.-26.5.1986 (in Swedish). Helsinki: Histricus. 1986. OCLC 186100523.
- Lind, John, ed. (1993). Det "Danska itinerariet": franciskansk expansionsstrategi i Östersjön (in Swedish). Helsinki: Society of Swedish Literature in Finland. ISBN 9789519018959.
- Lind, John, ed. (1998). Finland i medeltidens Europa: valda uppsatser (in Swedish). Helsinki: Society of Swedish Literature in Finland. ISBN 9789515830432.
