= Nils Bielke =

Swedish military man and politician (1644-1716)

Count Nils Bielke
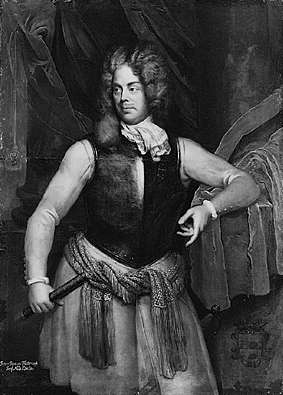
- Nils Bielke by David Richter the Younger.
- Born: 7 February 1644; Stockholm, Sweden
- Died: 26 November 1716 (aged 72)
- Spouse: Eva Horn
- Relatives: Carl Gustaf Bielke (son); Ture Gabriel Bielke (son)
- Military career
- Allegiance: Sweden
- Branch: Swedish Army
- Service years: c. 1670–1697
- Rank: Field marshal
- Commands: Life Regiment of Horse
- Conflicts: Scanian War: Battle of Lund; Great Turkish War: Battle of Vienna
- Other work: Governor-general of Pomerania

Count Nils Bielke (7 February 1644 – 26 November 1716) was a member of the High Council of Sweden, military man and politician.

Born the eldest son of Baron Ture Nilsson Bielke, who died in 1648, the five-year-old Nils Bielke was granted the barony of Korpo in the archipelago of Finland Proper in 1649 by Queen Christina. He married countess Eva Horn, one of the heiresses of the sonless field marshal Count Gustav Horn af Björneborg. They had ten children of which only six reached adulthood.

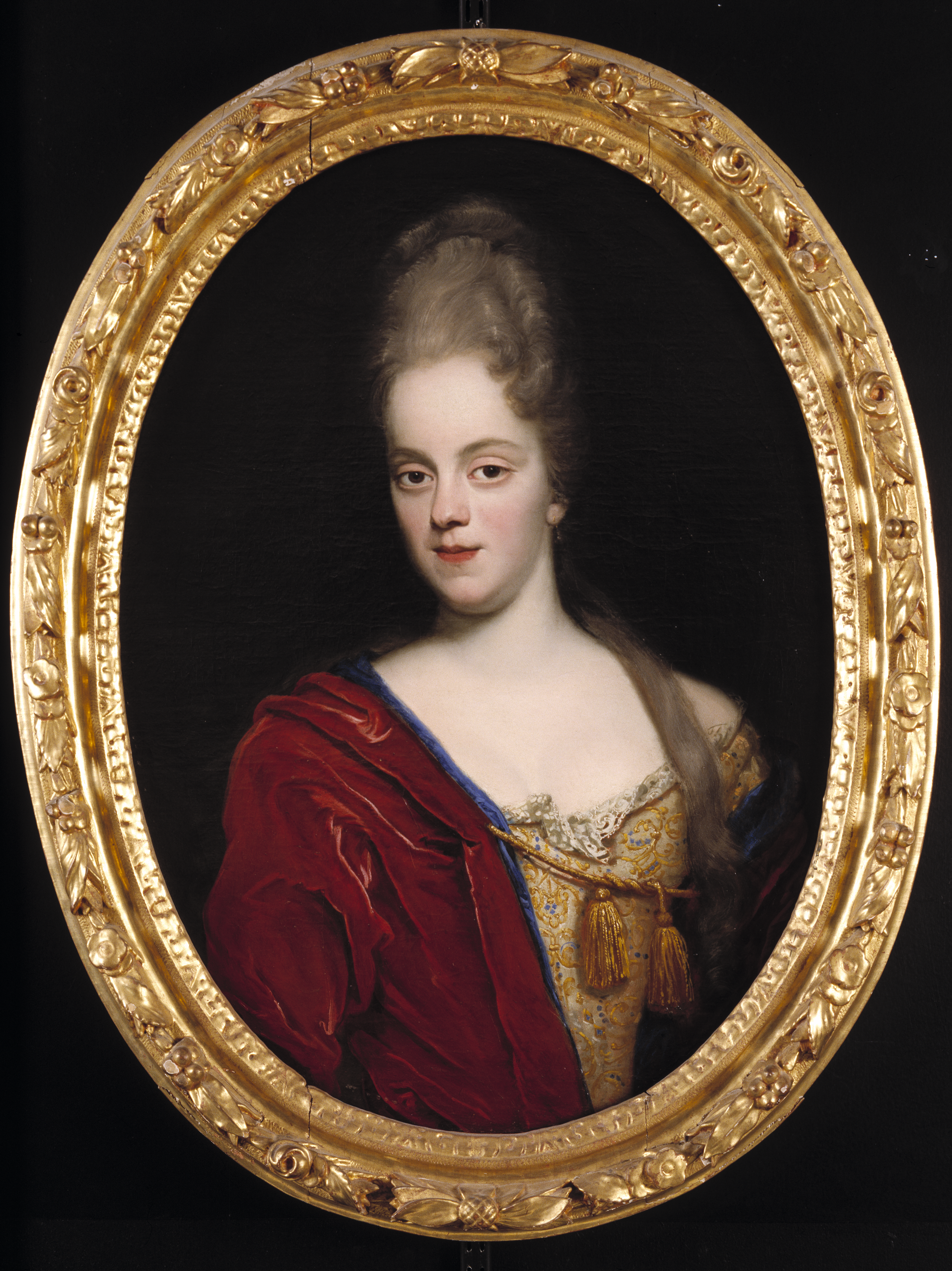
Nils Bielke's eldest daughter Eva Nilsdotter Bielke (1677–1715)

Nils Bielke entered the service of the Swedish Army and the Royal Court in the 1660s. He was appointed Lieutenant General in 1678, Governor-General of Swedish Estonia in 1687 and Swedish Pomerania (1687–98). He became Field Marshal in 1690.

During the Scanian War (1675–1679), he made important contributions both as a troop organizer and as an officer on the field. He especially distinguished himself at the Battle of Lund in 1676 as the commander of the Life Regiment of Horse.

He was Sweden's ambassador to France from 1679–1682 and 1684–1687 and also took part in Emperor Leopold I's Great Turkish War. He was created a Reichsgraf of the Holy Roman Empire. Charles XI of Sweden later allowed him comital rank in Sweden.

Nils Bielke was dissatisfied with Charles XI's despotic policy towards the old aristocracy. As the governor of Swedish Pomerania, it was only reluctantly that he took part in the reduction of property belonging to the nobility. In addition to this, he undertook private negotiations in order to push Sweden towards a pro-French policy against the wishes of the Swedish government.

As a result of this, he lost his position in 1698 and after a long legal process, he was sentenced to death in 1705. He was, however, pardoned and in 1715, he was redeemed.

== Sources ==
- The article Bielke, Nils in Nationalencyklopedin (1990)
