= Anna Bielke =

Swedish commander (1490–1525)

Anna Eriksdotter Bielke (1490 – 1525) was a Swedish noble, commander of the city and castle of Kalmar during the Swedish rebellion against Denmark.

== Biography ==
Anna was born to the noble councillor of state Erik Turesson (Bielke) and Gunilla Johansdotter Bese; among her siblings were riksråd and governor Axel Eriksson (Bielke), riksråd Ture Eriksson (Bielke) and the infamous Barbro Eriksdotter (Bielke). In 1514 she married the noble and riksråd Johan Månsson (Natt och Dag) (1470–1520), commander and governor of Kalmar 1510–1520.

At the death of her spouse in the middle of the rebellion against Denmark in 1520, she took control of his fiefs and defended Kalmar against Denmark. This was a similar experience as that of her mother, who as a widow defended Vyborg Castle against the Russians. When her relative Gustav Vasa was released from Danish captivity and returned to Sweden to take part in resistance against Danish rule, he turned to her first for assistance in the struggle. She received him kindly but did not think it possible to give him any help, as the fleet of Søren Norby was threatening the city, and the attitude in the city was pro-Danish. After Vasa's attempts to persuade the people to arm themselves against the Danish were met first by indifference and then by hostility he was forced to leave the city. Shortly thereafter, Anna was obliged to turn over the city to Denmark. The exact date of her surrender is not known, but it was between August and 6 September 1520.

Anna later became engaged to Henrik von Melen, brother of Berend von Melen, the commander of Kalmar in 1523-24 and related to the king by marriage to his cousin Margareta von Melen. Suspected by King Gustav of a conspiracy, he was deprived of his governorship of a military expedition by Anna's brother Nils Eriksson on the order of the king. She discontinued her engagement on the request of King Gustav in 1524 or 1525.

== In fiction ==
Anna Eriksdotter (Bielke) was portrayed in the opera Gustav Vasa by Gustav III of Sweden, which was performed by the Royal Swedish Opera in 1786, with Lovisa Augusti playing Anna.
