= Olavinlinna =

15th-century Finnish castle

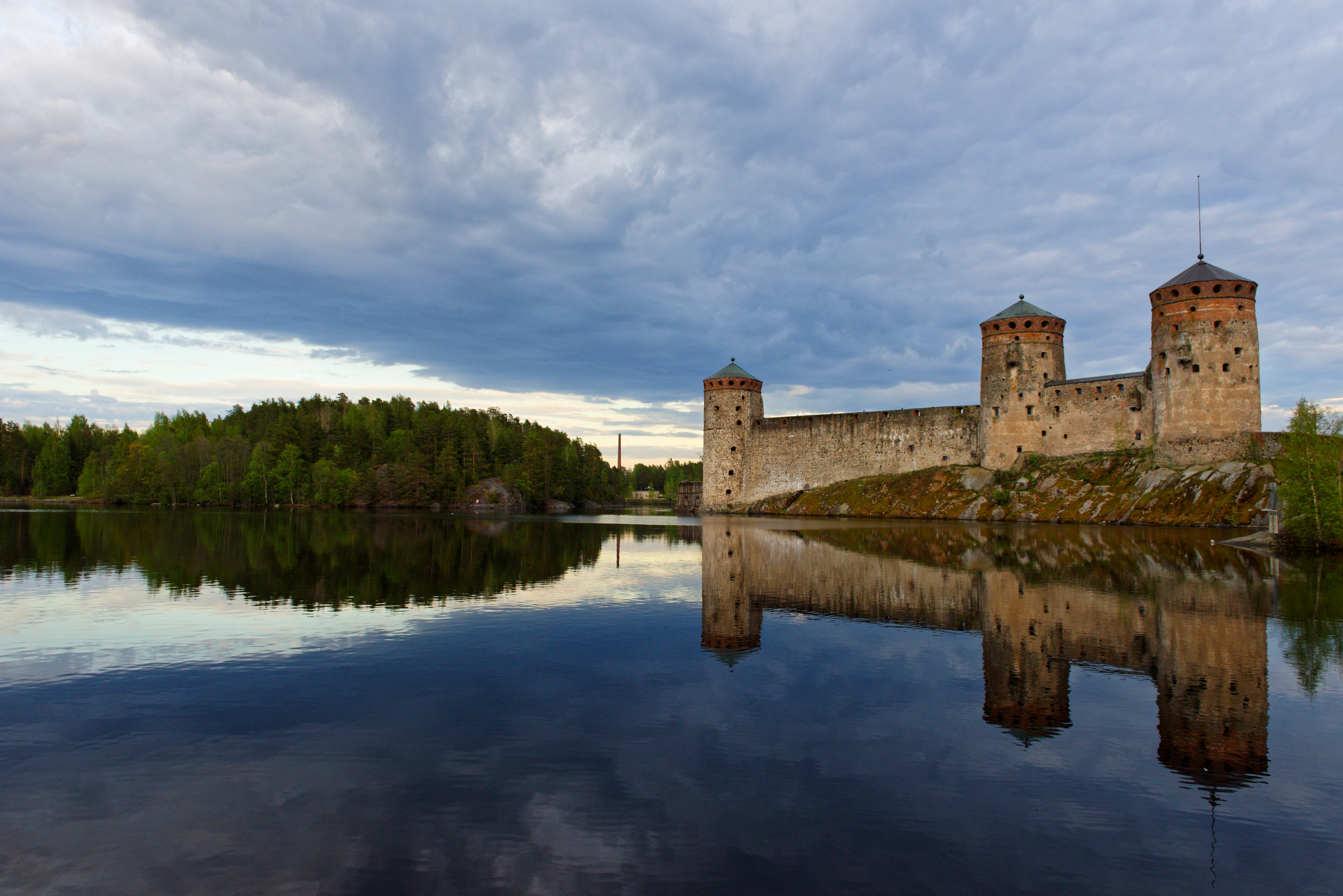
- The castle in 2020

- Location in Finland
- Alternative names: Olofsborg; St. Olaf's Castle

General information
- Architectural style: Castle
- Location: Savonlinna, Finland
- Coordinates: 61°51′50″N 028°54′04″E
- Construction started: 1475

Olavinlinna (Finnish: [ˈolɑʋinˌlinːɑ]; Swedish: Olofsborg), also known as St. Olaf's Castle, is a 15th-century three-tower castle located in Savonlinna, Finland. It is built on an island in the Kyrönsalmi strait that connects the lakes Haukivesi and Pihlajavesi. It is the northernmost medieval stone fortress still standing and also the best preserved of all the medieval castles in the Swedish realm. The castle forms a spectacular stage for the Savonlinna Opera Festival, which was held for the first time in the summer of 1912.

== History ==
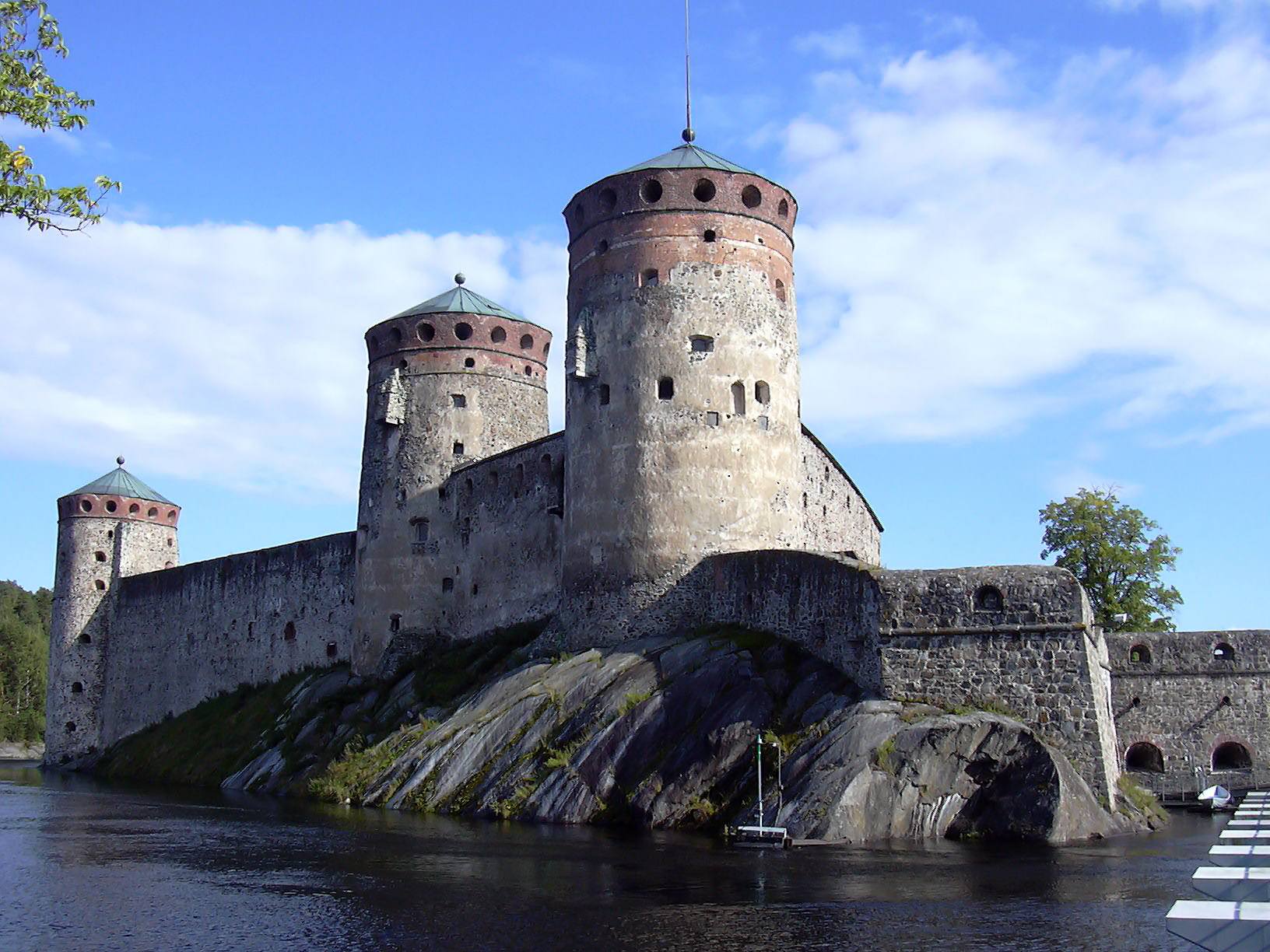
The castle has three towers remaining

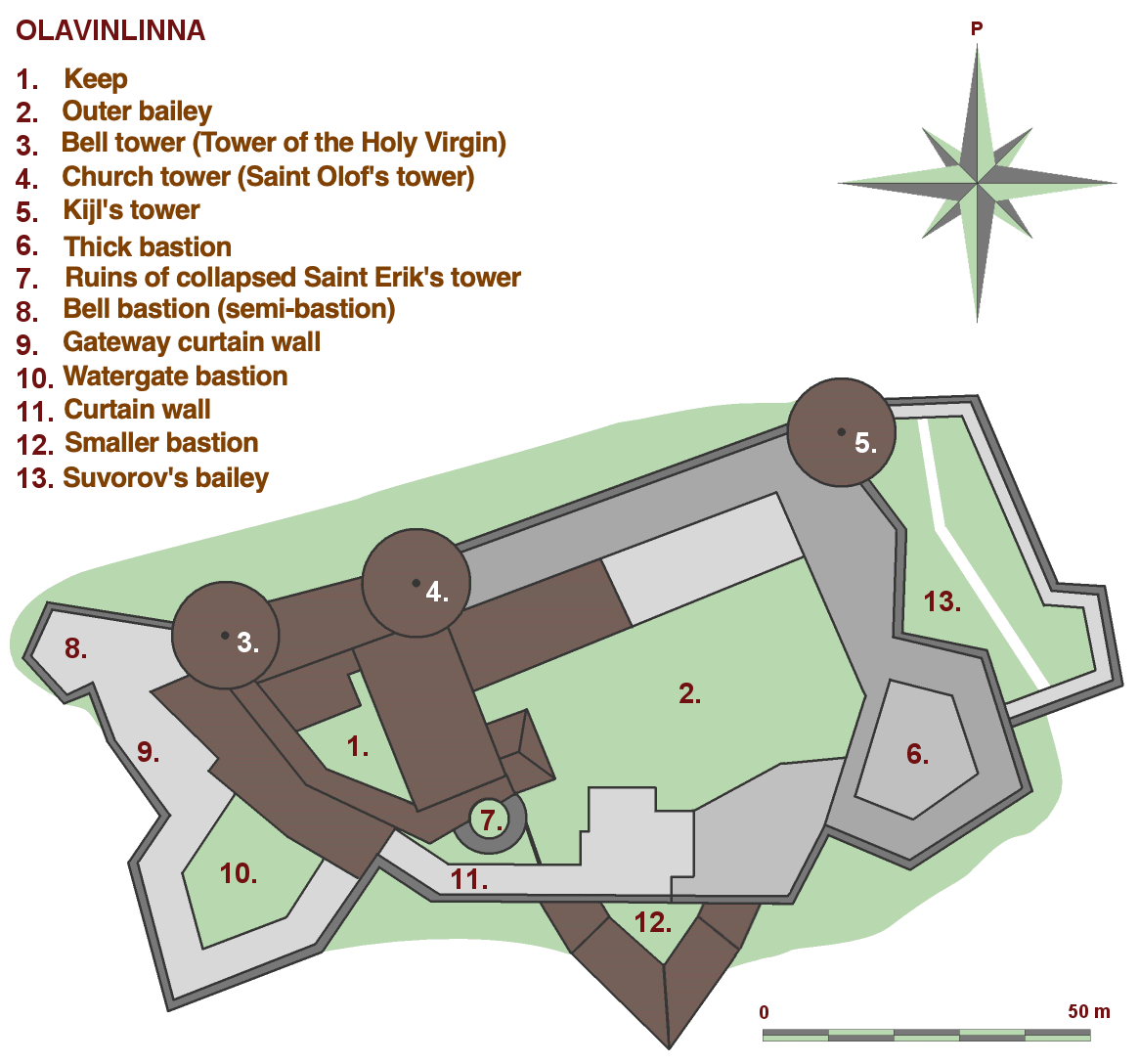
Ground plan

The fortress was founded by Erik Axelsson Tott in 1475 under the name Sankt Olofsborg in an effort to profit from the political turmoil following Ivan III's conquest of the Novgorod Republic. It was sited in Savonia so as to lay claim to the Russian side of the border established by the Treaty of Nöteborg.

One of Tott's letters from 1477 includes a passing mention of foreign builders invited to Olofsborg, probably from Reval, where the city fortifications were being extended. It was the first Swedish castle provided with a set of thickset circular towers that could withstand cannon fire. It is not by accident that a network of lakes and waterways forms the setting for the castle, for these would seriously impede a prospective Russian offensive.

The three-towered keep was completed in 1485, and the construction of the outer curtain walls with two towers was initiated immediately. They were completed in 1495. The castle is roughly a truncated rhomboid with keep on the western side of the island and the curtain walls and outer bailey to east. One of the towers of the keep, St. Erik's Tower, has a bad foundation and has since collapsed. One of the towers of Bailey, the Thick Tower, exploded in 1791. A bastion, the Thick Bastion, has been built on its place. The castle was converted into a Vaubanesque fort in the late 18th century with bastions.

=== Warfare ===
Olofsborg withstood several sieges by the Russians during the First and Second Russian-Swedish wars. A brisk trade developed under the umbrella of the castle towards the end of the 16th century, giving birth to the town of Savonlinna, which was chartered in 1639.

While the castle was never captured by force, its garrison agreed to terms of surrender twice; first to invading Russians on 28 July 1714 and the second time on 8 August 1743, with the latter conflict's peace treaty in form of the Treaty of Åbo leading to the castle and the entire region being ceded to Empress Elizabeth of Russia. During the Russian era Alexander Suvorov personally inspected rearmament of the fortress.

Several devastating fires destroyed much of the castle's decor in the 19th century, all of its original furnishings were destroyed.

=== Border conflicts ===
Border conflict at Nyslott
- Part of the Russo-Swedish Wars
Date	1499
Location	Nyslott
Result	Swedish victory
Territorial changes	Russians repulsed from Nyslott

Belligerents
Kalmar Union; Sweden	Russia

Commanders and leaders
Eric Bielke	Unknown

Strength
Unknown	1,000

Casualties and losses
Unknown	Heavy

After the conclusion of the Russo-Swedish War of 1495-1497, Sten Sture returned to Sweden and discovered that a large revolt had begun against him, resulting in the Battle of Rotebro where he was deposed in favor of King Hans of Denmark.

In August of 1499, the governor of Vyborg, Eric Bielke, received alarming reports about battles against Russian forces who believed Nyslott was rightfully Russian and were attempting to move the border posts to include the town within Russian territory. Of the 1,000 Russians that took part in the fighting, only about 200 are said to have been equipped with firearms; the others fought with axes and sabers. In the following battles, the Russians suffered heavy casualties and were repulsed.

While further details on the battles are not known, they seem to have been limited to the area around Nyslott. On the 14th of September 1504, Eric Bielke was able to sign a truce lasting 20 years with the Russians. The next major war between Sweden and Russia would not come until 1554. Despite this, there was no guaranteed peace on the border between them, and among other things a letter from 1509 tells that "the enemies of God and Christendom, the intransigent Russians" have ravaged Finland.

=== Life inside the castle ===
Olavinlinna Castle had a maximum population of about 200 people, but it was a cold and damp place to live, especially in winter. Olavinlinna Castle also raised rams; on the feast day of the castle's patron saint, Saint Olaf, in late July, people would eat a meal of ram meat.

== Tourism ==
The castle hosts several small exhibitions. These include the Castle Museum which displays artifacts found in the castle or related to it, and the Orthodox Museum which displays icons and other religious artifacts both from Finland and Russia.

Olavinlinna is the initial model for Kropow Castle in the bande dessinée King Ottokar's Sceptre, an album in the series of Adventures of Tintin created by Hergé.

== Gallery ==
History
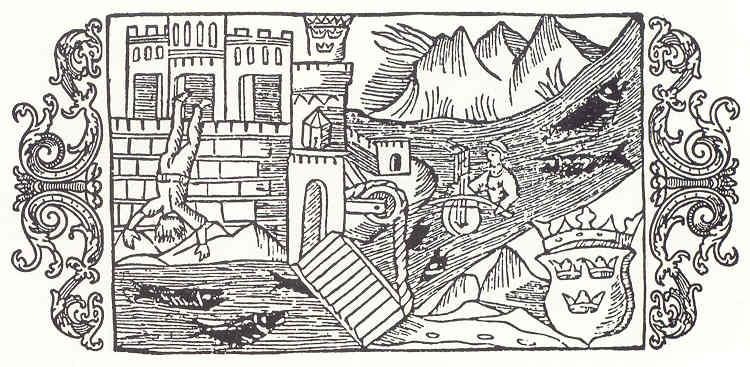
Olofsborg in Olaus Magnus' Historia de gentibus septentrionalibus, 1555

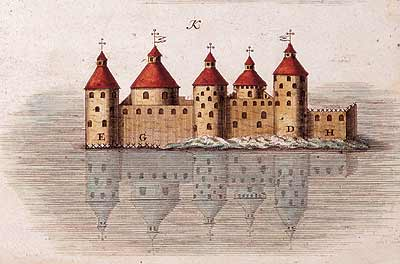
Olavinlinna the way it looked in 1690s before one of the towers had collapsed and another exploded, chalcography from 1762

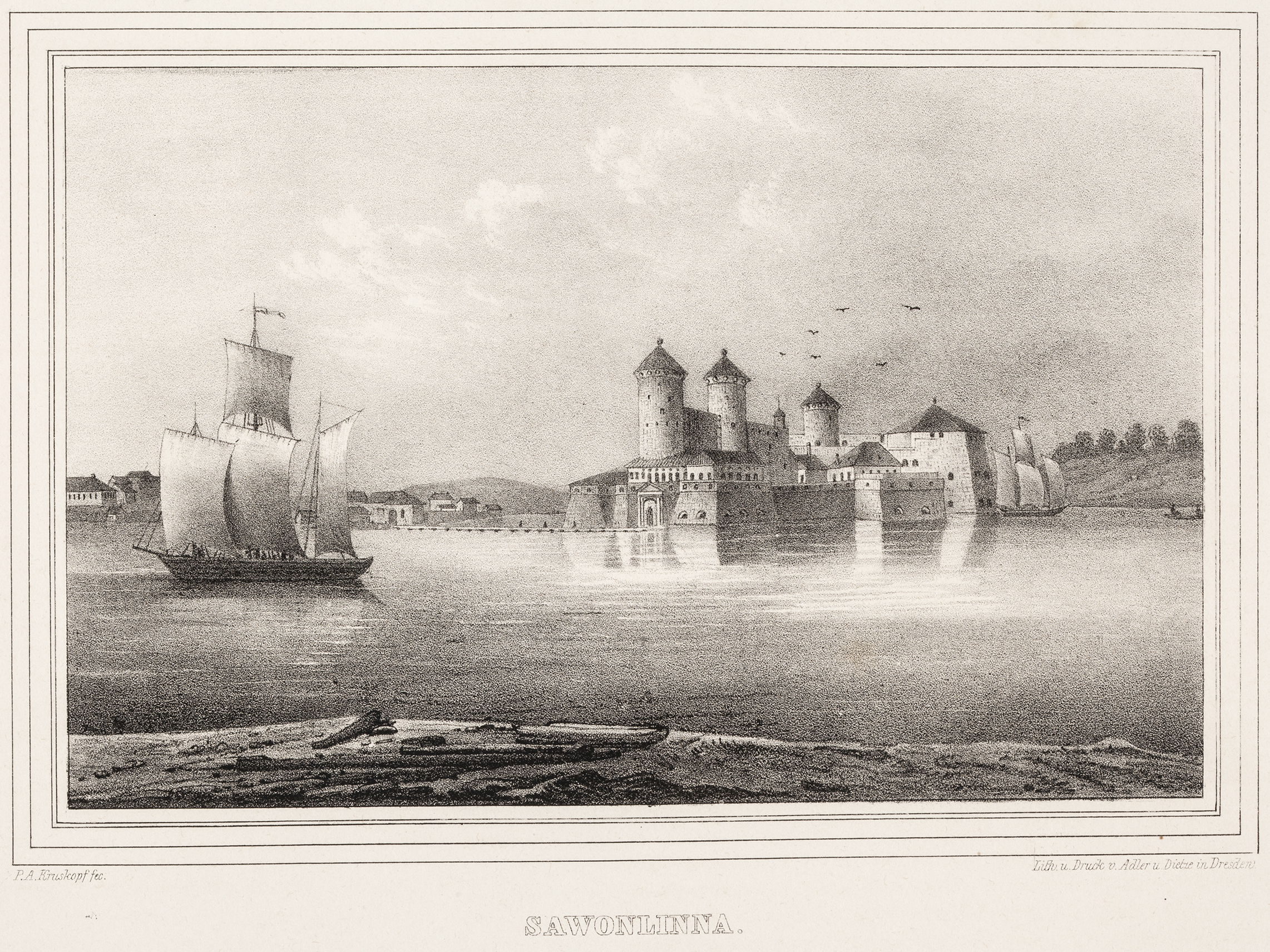
Lithography by Pehr Kruskopf, 1847

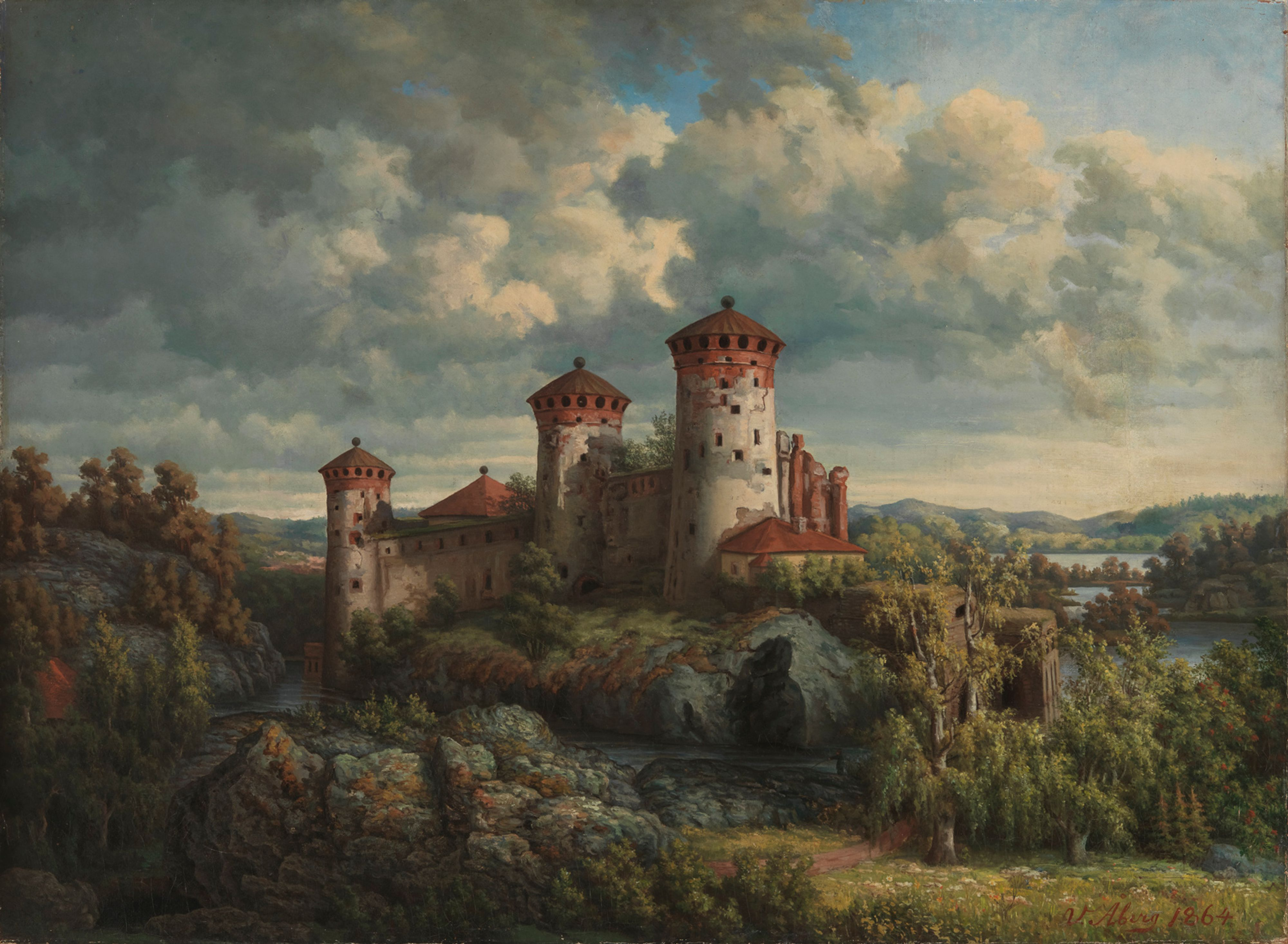
A View over the Castle Olavinlinna, Victoria Åberg, 1864

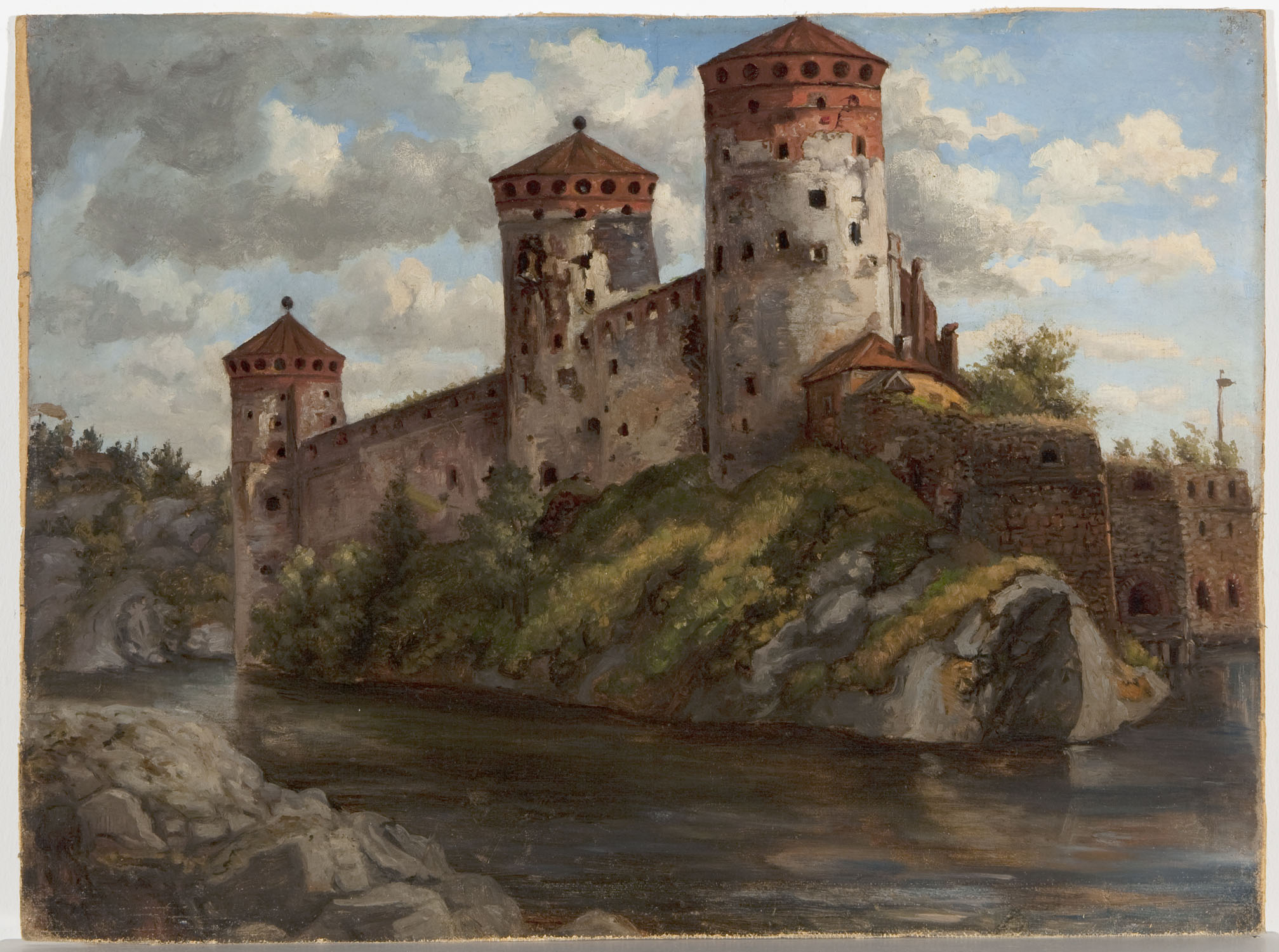
Olavinlinna by Victoria Åberg, unknown date

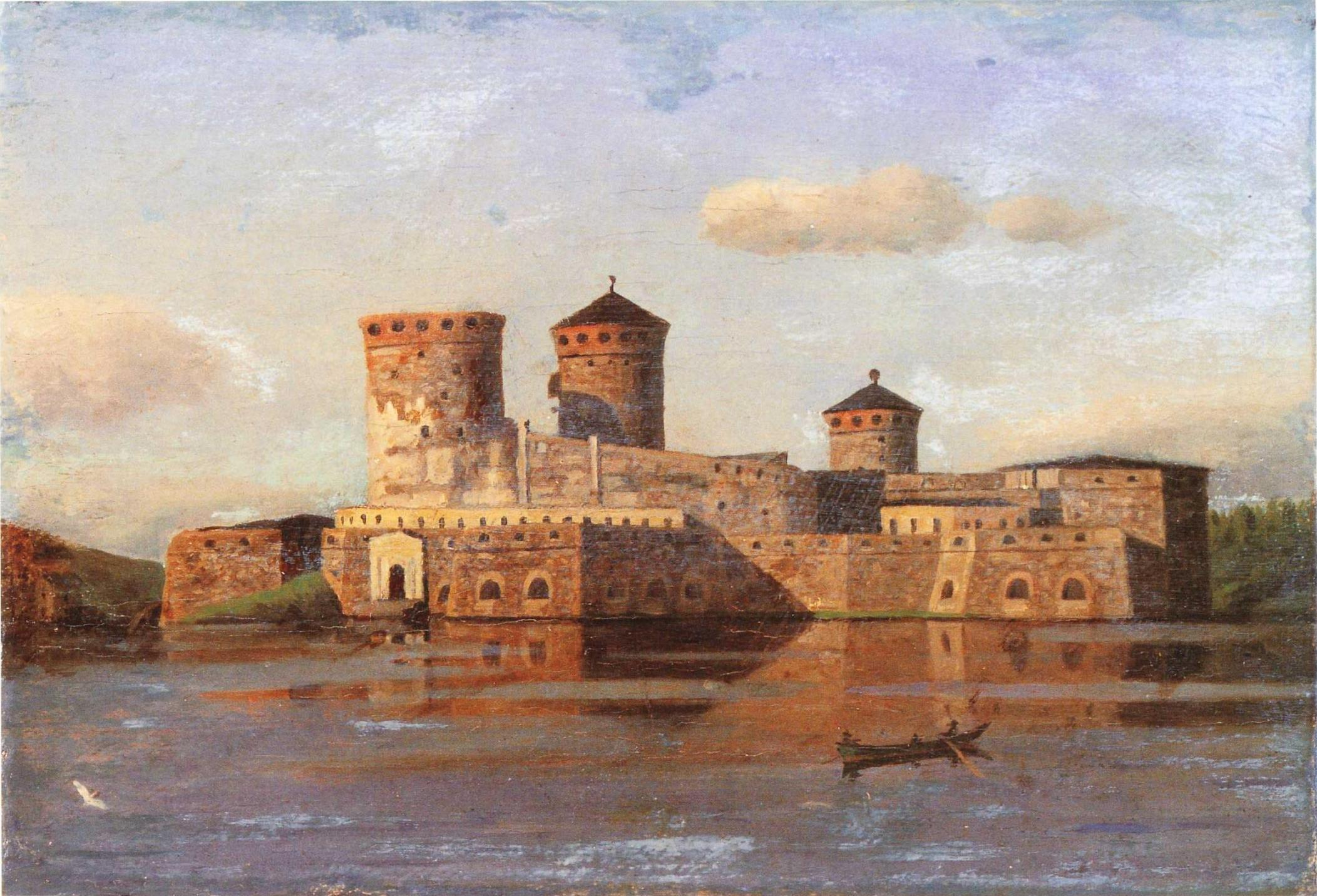
Painting of the castle in 1870 by Oscar Kleineh, before restoration

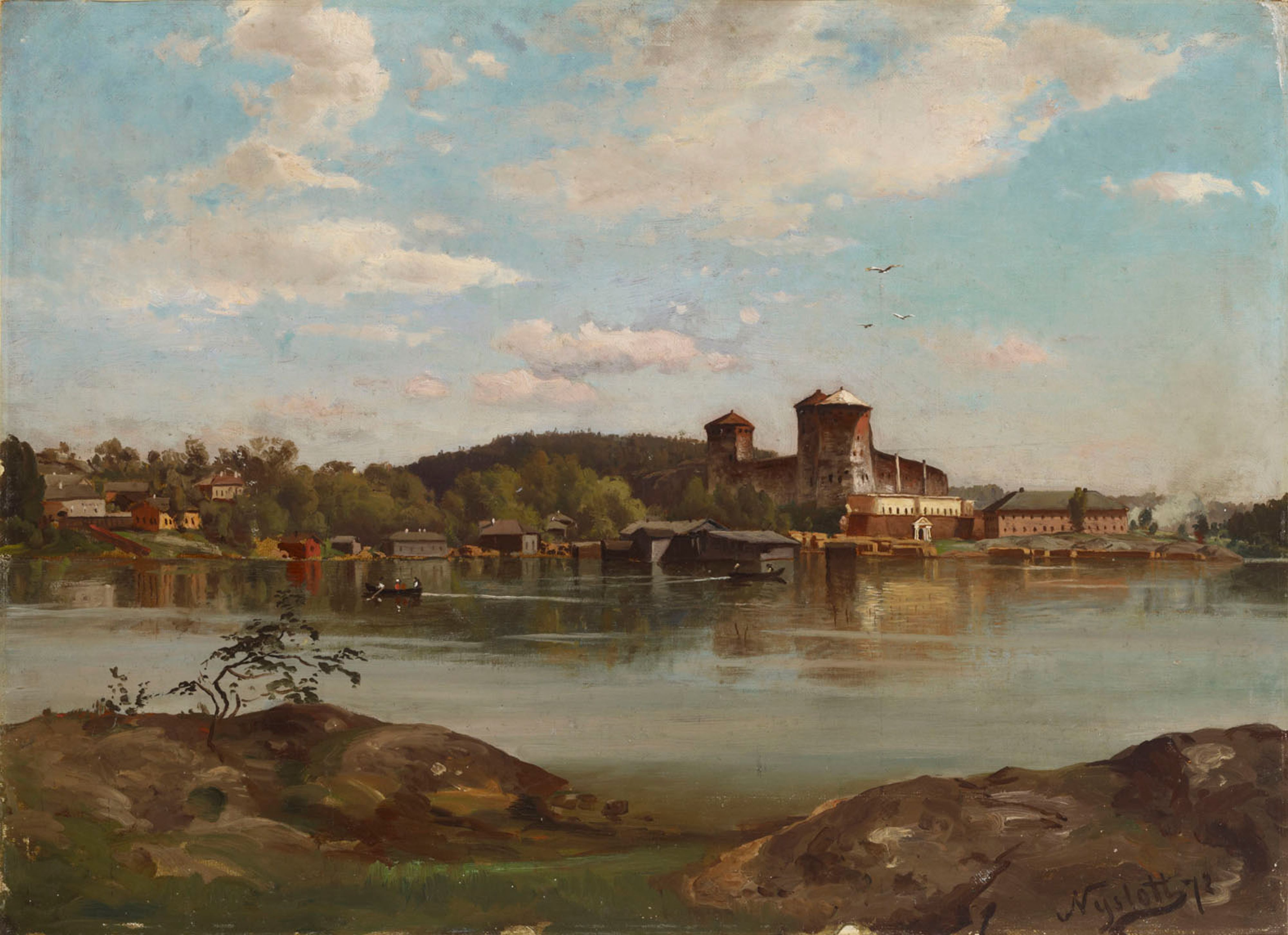
Sketch by Hjalmar Munsterhjelm, 1873

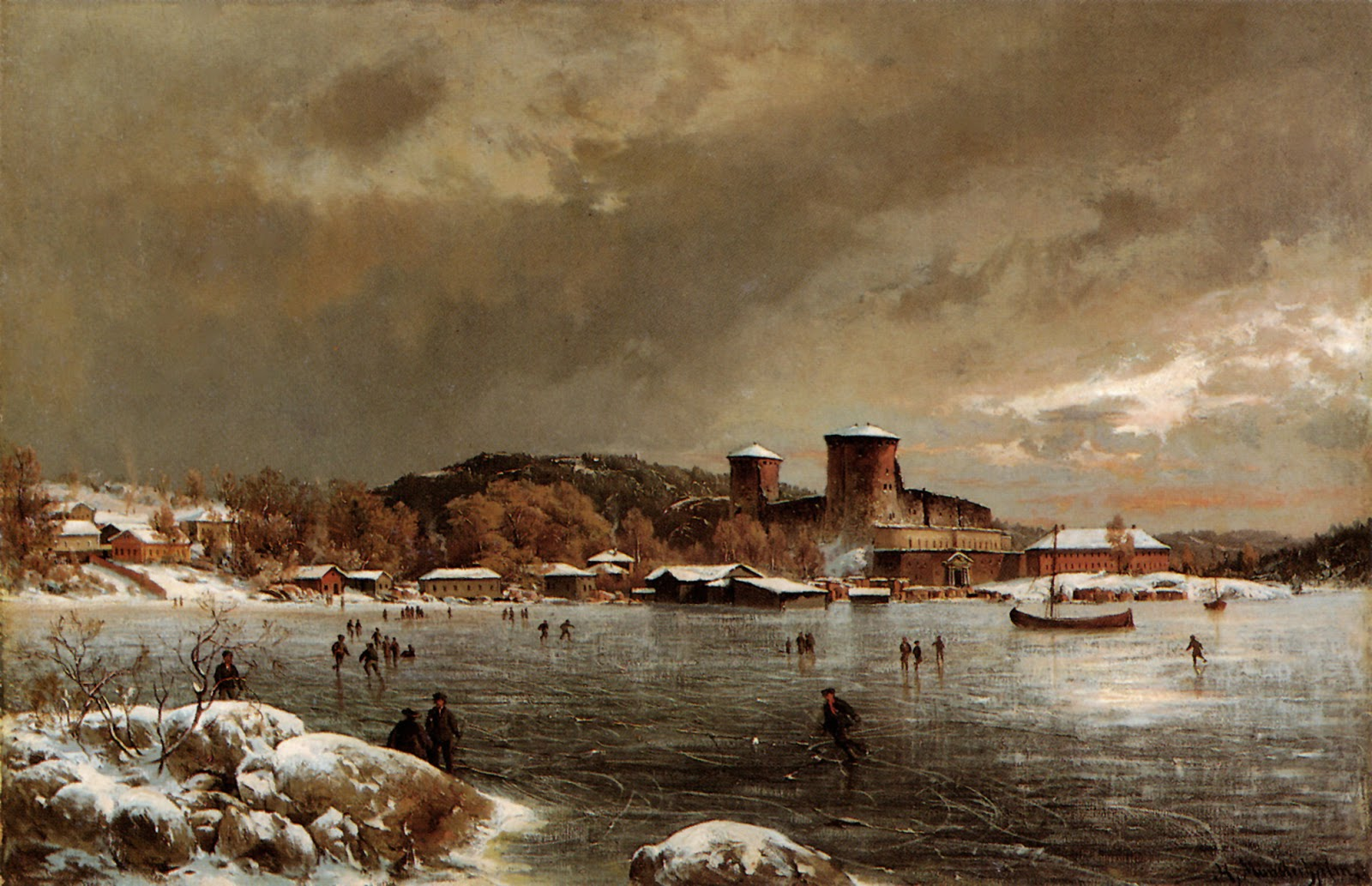
During winter by Hjalmar Munsterhjelm

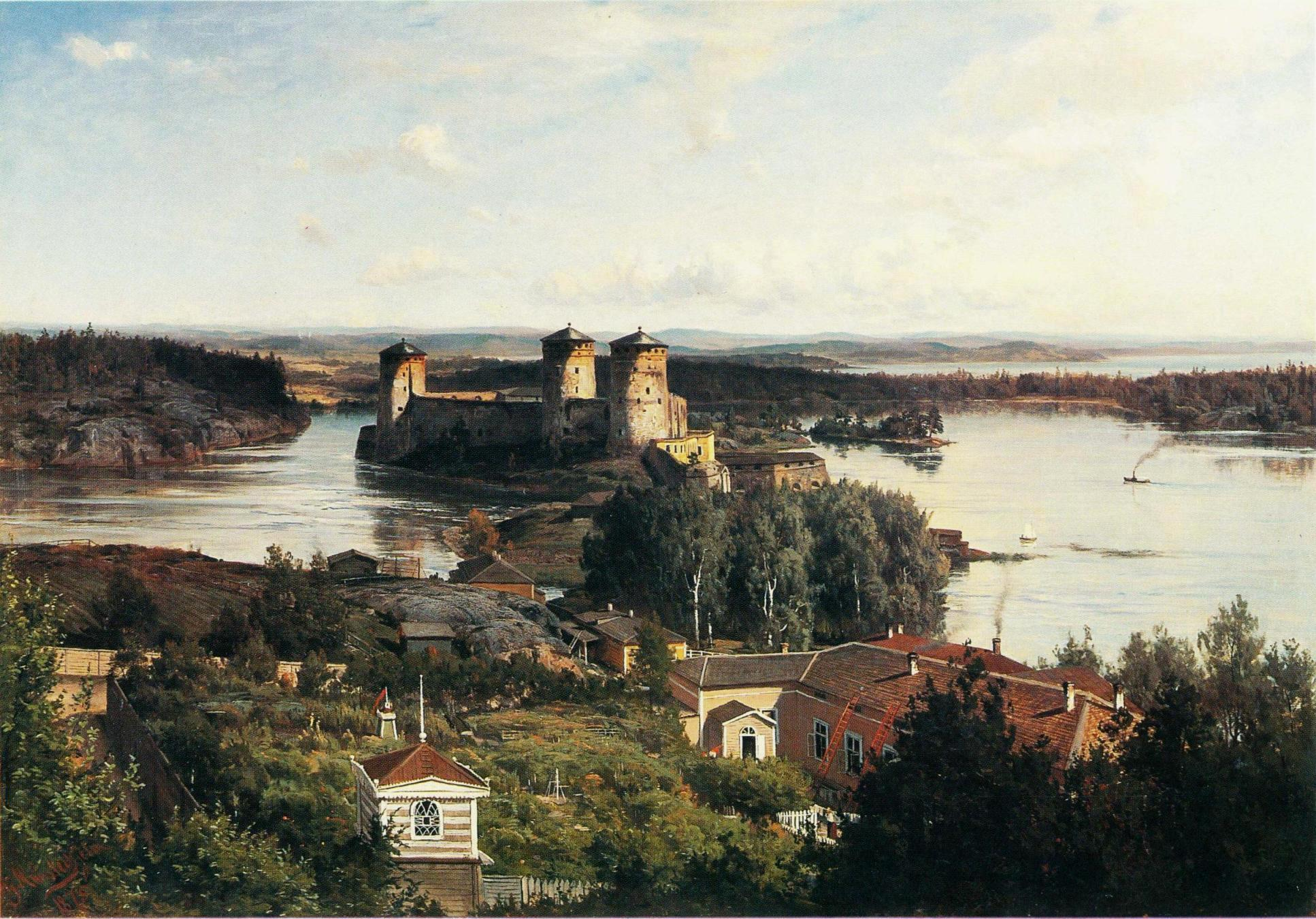
Olavinlinna, Hjalmar Munsterhjelm, 1875

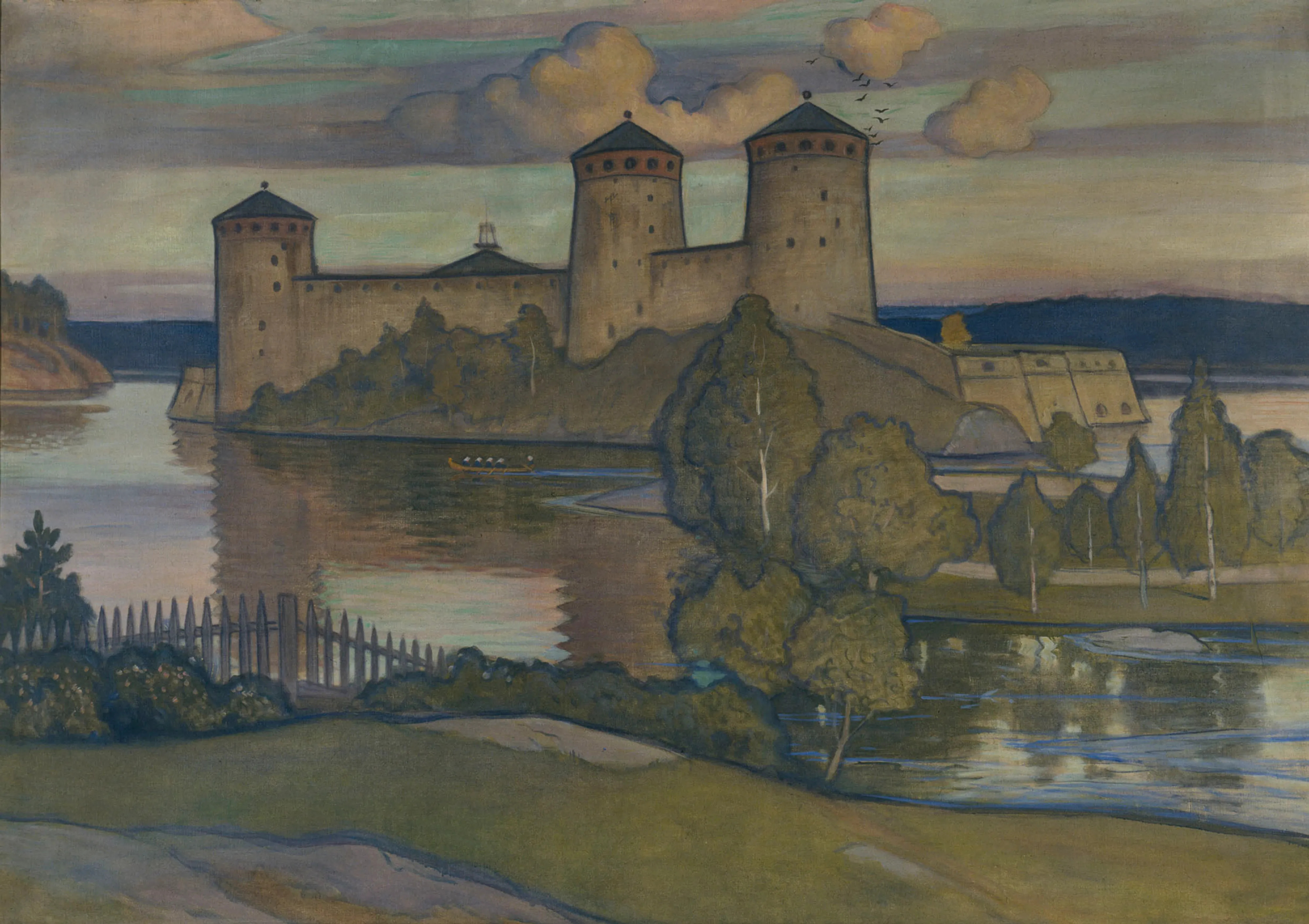
Olavinlinna, Väinö Blomstedt, 1900
Current day
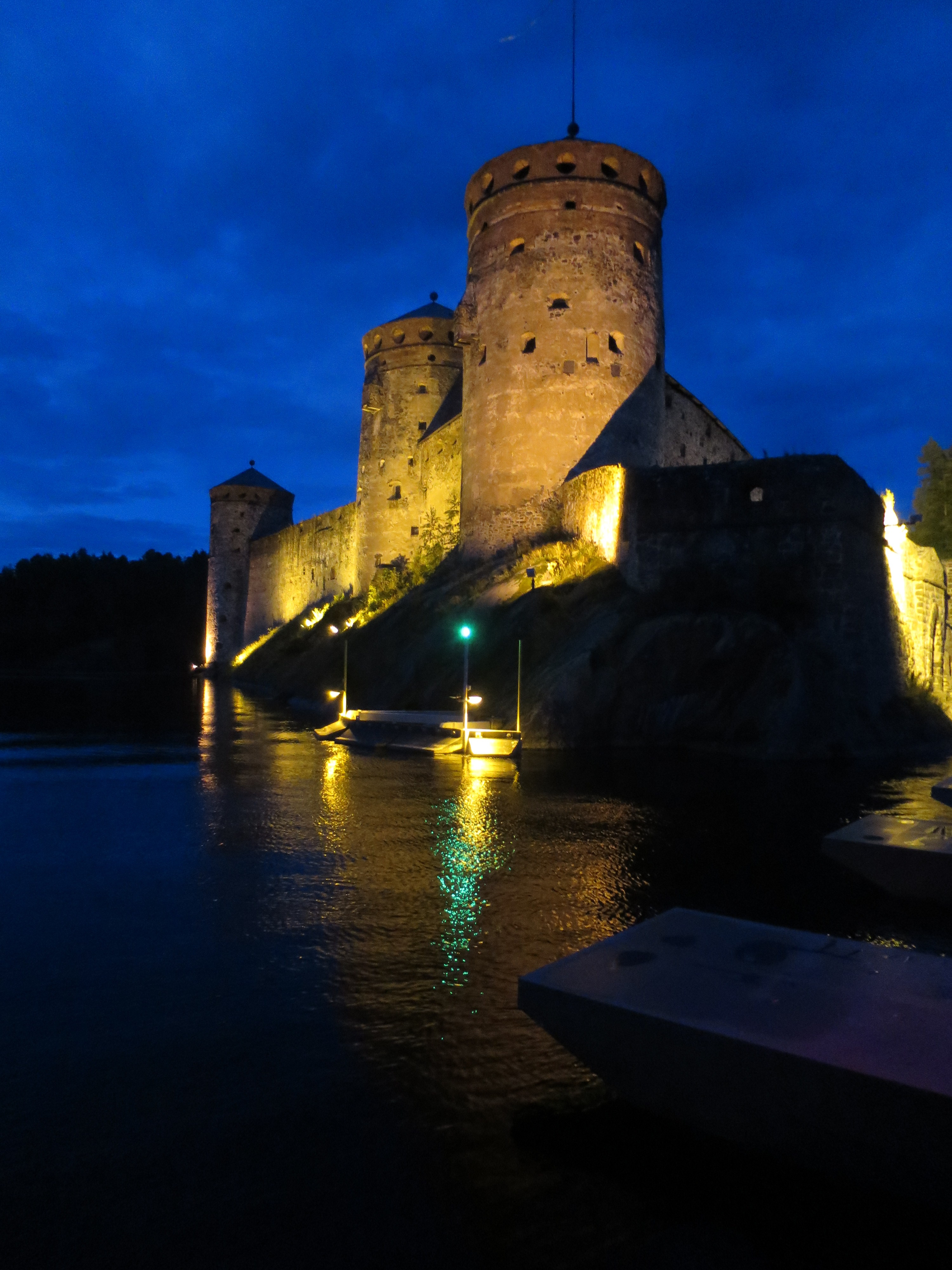
Lit in the night

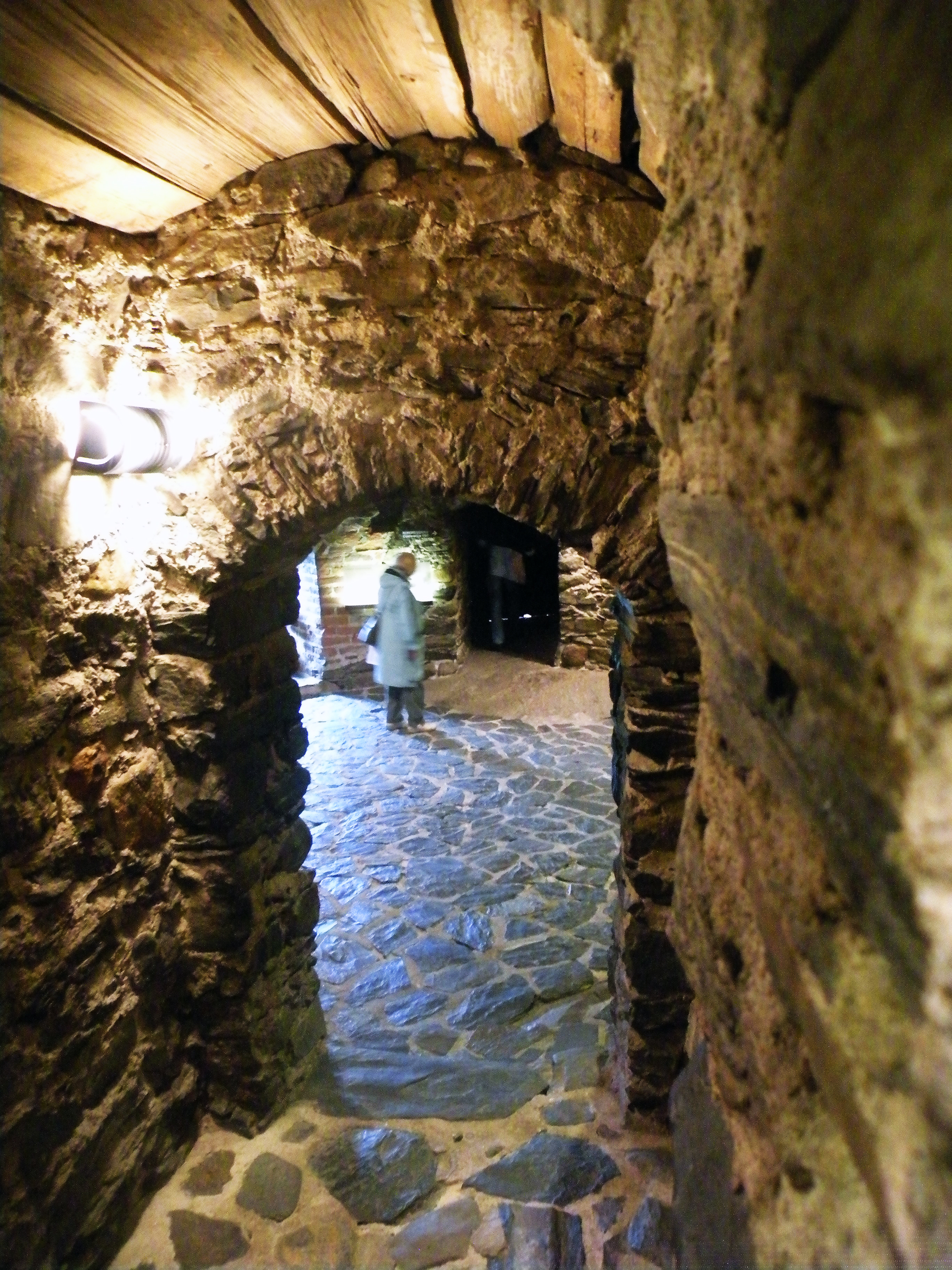
Interior

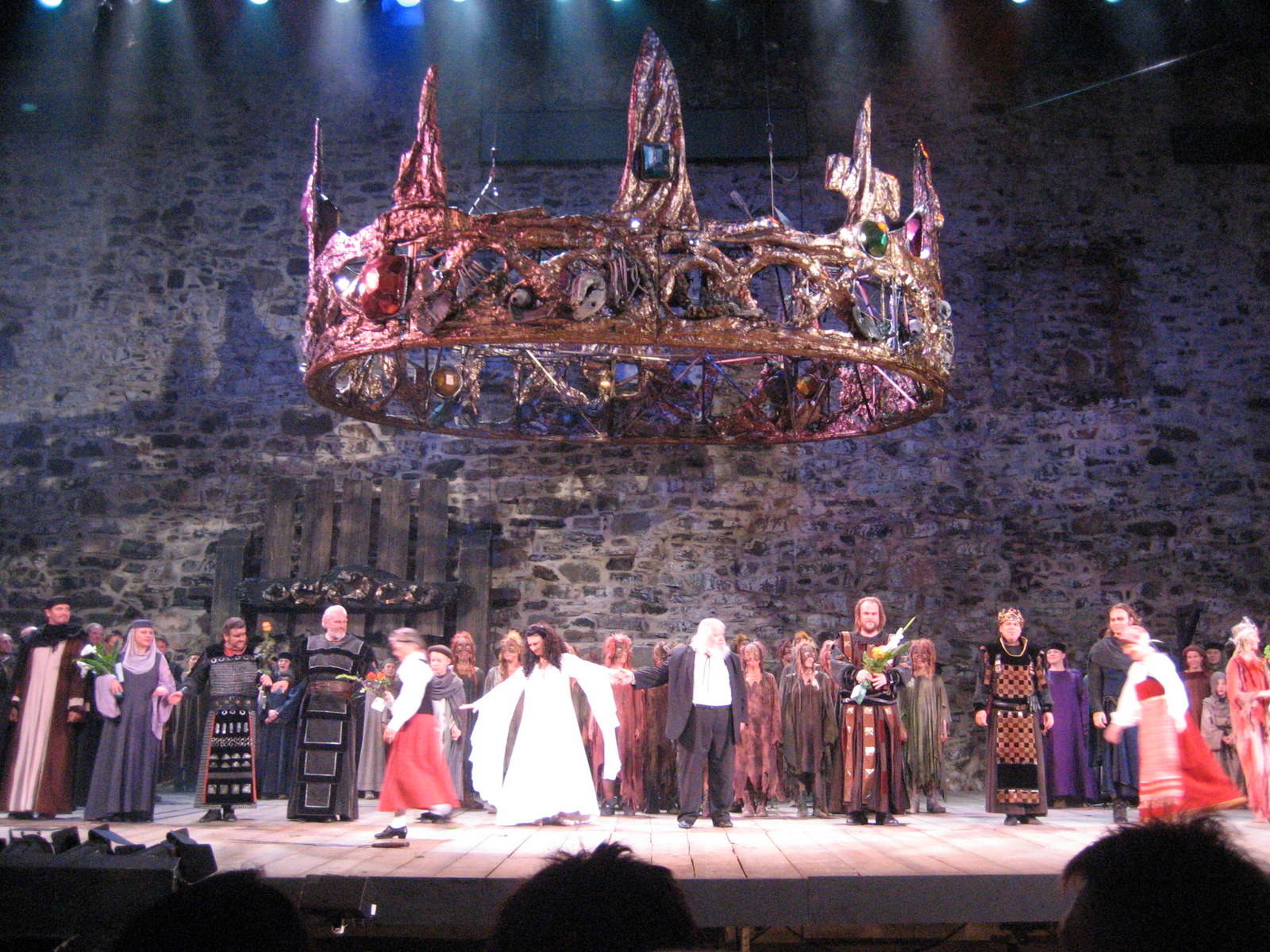
Macbeth applause at Savonlinna Opera Festival in 2007

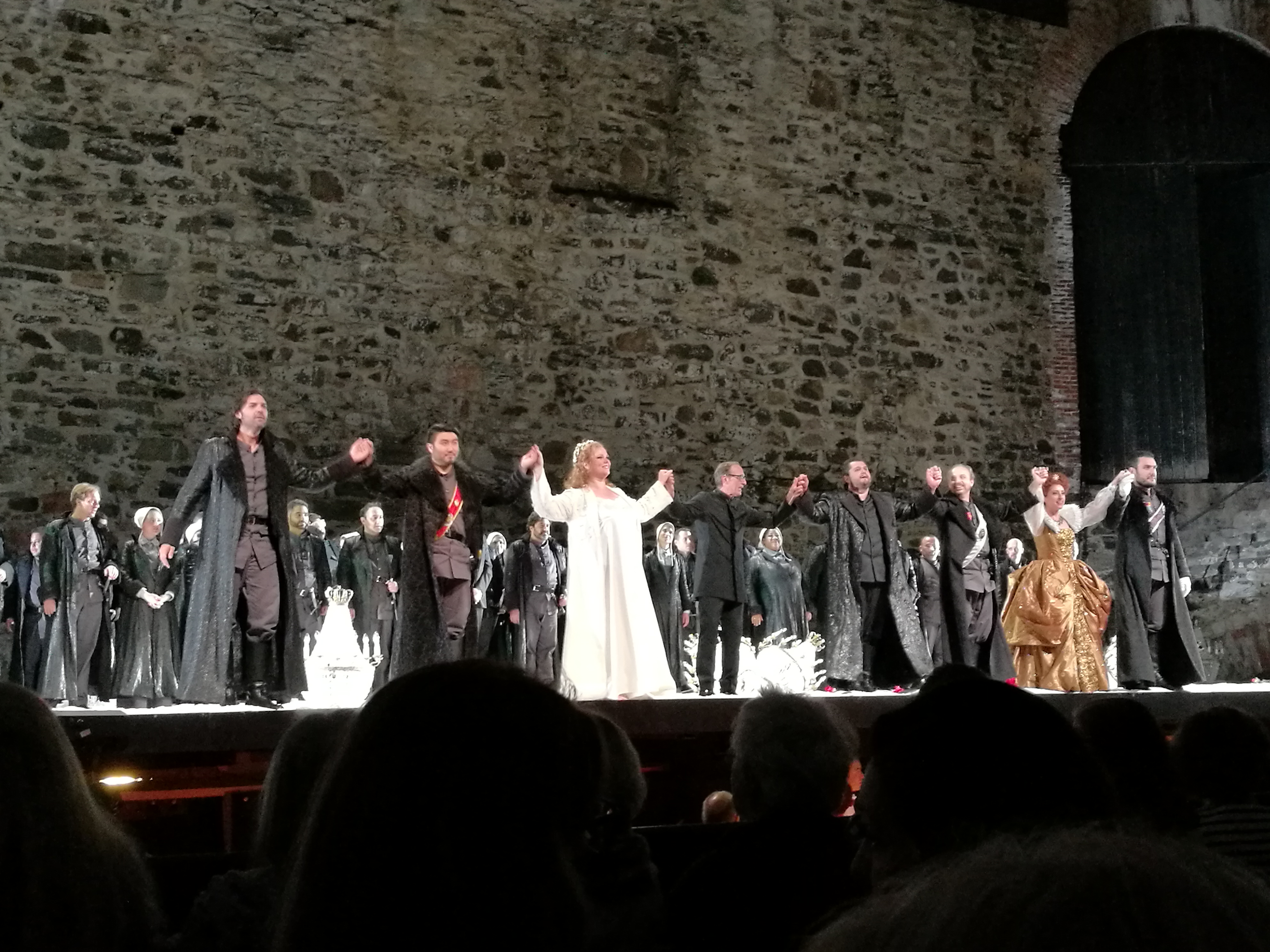
Savonlinna Opera in 2017

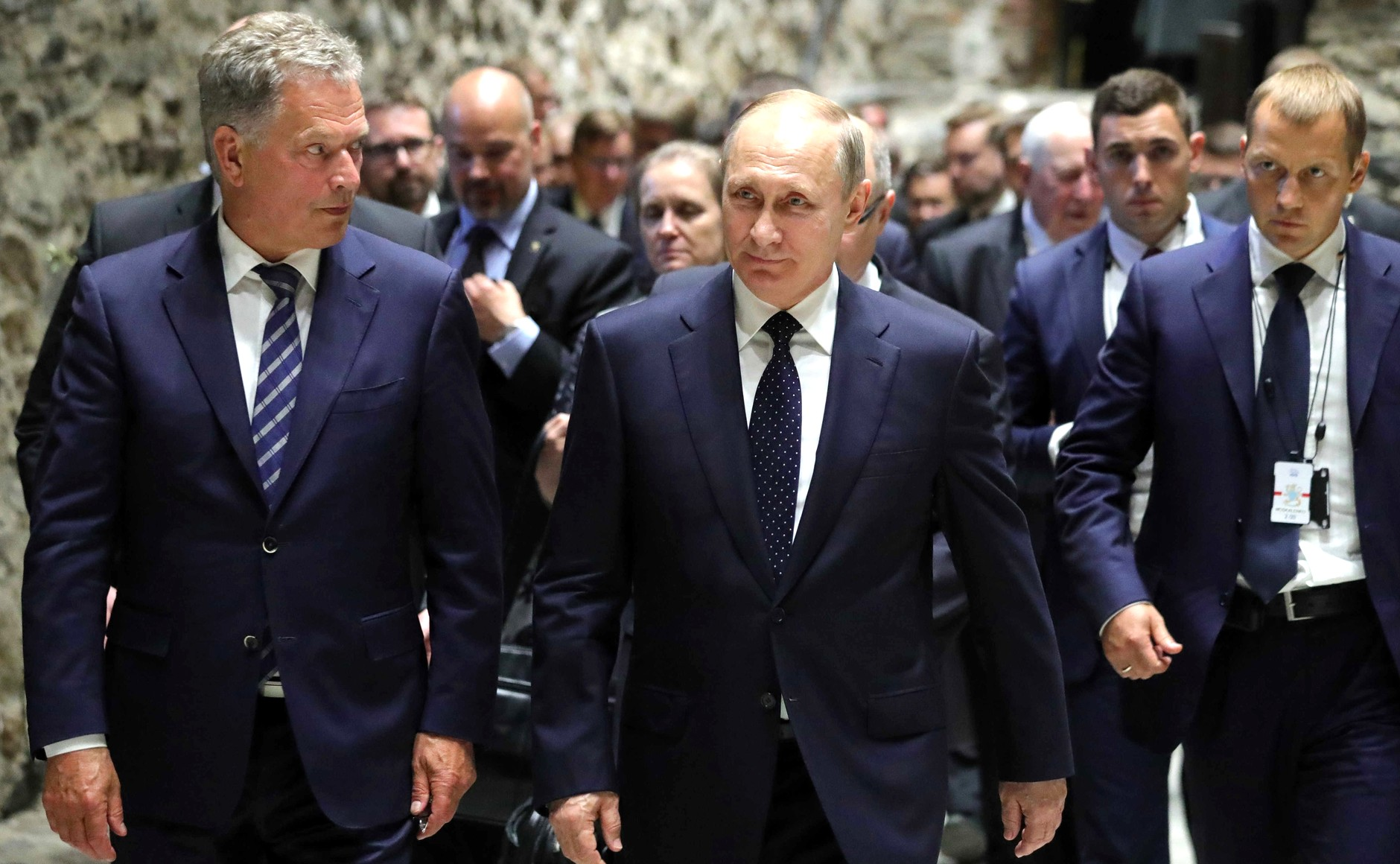
Russian president Vladimir Putin as a guest of Finnish president Sauli Niinistö at Savonlinna Opera, 2017

== See also ==
- Brahe Castle
