= Gunilla Bese =

Finnish (Swedish) noble (1475–1553)

Gunilla Johansdotter Bese, also called Gunhild (1475–1553) was a Finnish (Swedish) noble and fiefholder of Vyborg Castle from 1511 to 1513.

== Life ==
Bese was the daughter of Johan Stensson Bese and Catherine Jonsdotter. She married riksråd Eric Bielke, fiefholder of Vyborg. After the death of her spouse in 1511, she took over his position as interim governor and commandant of Vyborg until a new governor was appointed and installed in 1513.

During her term, the peace treaty of 1510 was threatened by the Russians, but she initiated renewed peace negotiations and thereby prevented the outbreak of a new war. In 1512, she opposed the suggested candidate for the position of commandant of Vyborg, and eventually succeeded in having her son-in-law, Lord Toni Eriksson Tott, appointed; she ceded her position to him in 1513. After this, she retired to tend to the estates left to her by her late spouse in Sweden, and was described as an efficient landowner.

In 1520 at Kalmar Castle, Bese's eldest daughter Anna had a similar experience to her mother's; when Anna's husband, the governor, died, she continued to rule the castle and fief and led the war efforts (in that case, against the Danish). Her son Axel's descendant Gunilla Bielke became queen, the second wife of John III of Sweden.

Bese died on 7 April 1553 in Bernhamra, Sweden.

== Legacy ==
The Fru Gunillas Gränd is named after her.
