= Carl Gustaf Bielke =

Swedish count and book collector

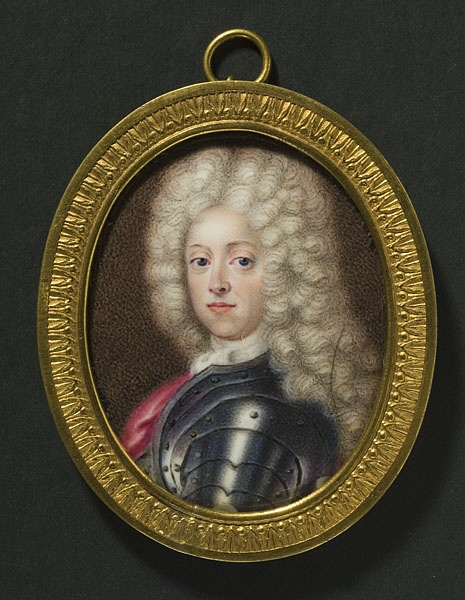
Carl Gustaf Bielke

Carl Gustaf Bielke (1683–1754) was a Swedish count and book collector. He was the son of Nils Bielke, and he is known for his collection of more than 8,000 books, which later became part of the Skokloster Castle library after the collection passed to his nephew, Erik Brahe. Bielke's collection focused on books related to medicine, theology, and law, many of which were obtained during his travels in France or from auctions in Uppsala and Stockholm during the 1730s and 1740s. He was governor of Västernorrland County from 1727 to 1739.
