= Haak =

Haak is a Dutch surname. It is thought to often be patronymic of origin, referring to a now extinct given name, or, considering the meaning "hook", be toponymic, descriptive or metonymic (e.g. a fish hook referring to a fisherman). People with this surname include:

- Bob Haak (1916–1992), American football player
- Bob Haak (1926–2005), Dutch art historian
- Guus Haak (born 1937), Dutch football defender
- Howie Haak (1911–1999), American baseball scout
- Hugo Haak (born 1991), Dutch track cyclist
- Isabelle Haak (born 1999), Swedish volleyball player
- Jan Haak (1917–1993), South African politician, Government Minister 1964–70
- Jessica Haak, American (North Dakota) Democratic politician
- Jur Haak (1890–1945), Dutch footballer
- Justin Haak (born 2001), American soccer player
- Nico Haak (1939–1990), Dutch pop singer
- Sikko Popta Haak (1876–1937), Dutch pedagogue and historian
- Theodore Haak (1605–1690), German Calvinist scholar in England

== See also ==
- Haack, German surname
