= War of Deposition against Karl Knutsson =

Uprising against Karl Knutsson in 1457

- Part of the Dano-Swedish War of 1449–1457
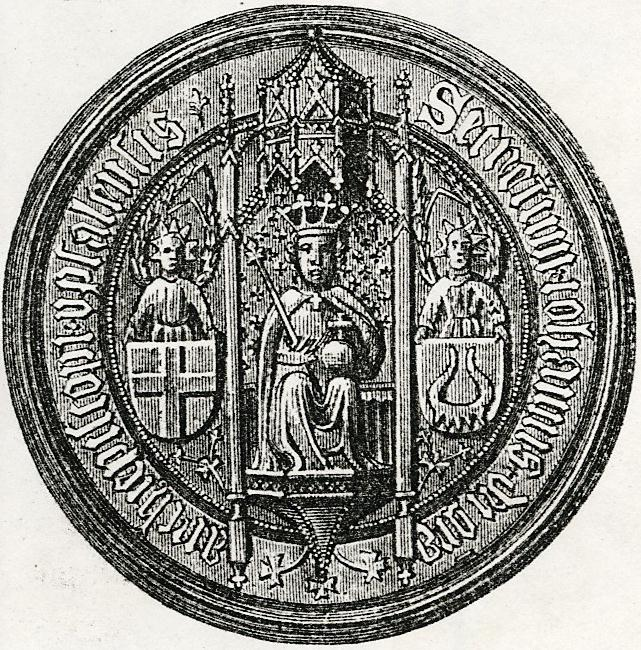
- Seal of Archbishop Jöns Bengtsson Oxenstierna from 1465
Date	Early January – 24 February 1457
Location	Sweden
Result	Rebel victory
Territorial changes	Karl Knutsson is deposed and replaced by Christian I as the Swedish king

Belligerents
Sweden	Rebels under Jöns Oxenstierna

Commanders and leaders
Karl Knutsson (WIA); Örjan Karlsson (POW); Håkan Svensson (POW); Arendt Bengtsson; Olof Drake	Jöns Bengtsson Oxenstierna; Erik Axelsson Tott

Units involved
Stockholm garrison Viborg garrison	Unknown

Strength
1,400 cavalry 300 men	Unknown

Casualties and losses
Heavy	Unknown

The War of Deposition against Karl Knutsson (Swedish: Avsättningskriget mot Karl Knutsson), also called the crisis of 1457 (Swedish: krisen 1457) and Jöns Bengtsson's Throne Usurpation of 1457 (Swedish: Jöns Bengtssons tronomvälvning år 1457) occurred in the winter of 1457 during the final stages of the Dano-Swedish War of 1449–1457.

It started when Archbishop Jöns Bengtsson (Oxenstierna) and other pro-unionists took advantage of Karl Knutsson's absence in Östergötland, formally rebelling after Jöns Bengtsson renounced his loyalty. During the rebellion, both sides fought a battle at Älgsundet, ending in a crushing rebel victory and forcing Karl Knutsson to retreat back to Stockholm, which capitulated on 24 February after Karl Knutsson escaped to Danzig.

== Background ==
In early 1457, when Karl Knutsson was marching to reconquer Öland, he received news that Archbishop Jöns Bengtsson (Oxenstierna) had rebelled. This was due to the ongoing war between Denmark and Sweden having caused unrest in Sweden. The situation was worsened by high taxes and poor crop growth during the last few years and thus Jöns Bengtsson along with other pro-unionist's saw a good opportunity to reinstate Christian I as the Swedish king.

== Deposition ==
Before his uprising, Oxenstierna was tasked by Karl Knutsson to gather troops in Uppland for the upcoming campaign against Denmark. He did as told, but instead of fighting the Danes, he instead sent a letter to Karl Knutsson renouncing his loyalty and marched on Västerås with a part of his force which he captured. According to the Sture Chronicle, he assembled a group of warriors at his cathedral, where he put is crosier on the altar and exclaimed to not end the rebellion until "Sweden's law is made right". He would later march southwards. In Uppland, Jöns Bengtsson and his men arrested the bailiff, Håkan Svensson on 25 January, and imprisoned him. People all around Uppsala quickly joined the rebellion, with their patience having run thin.

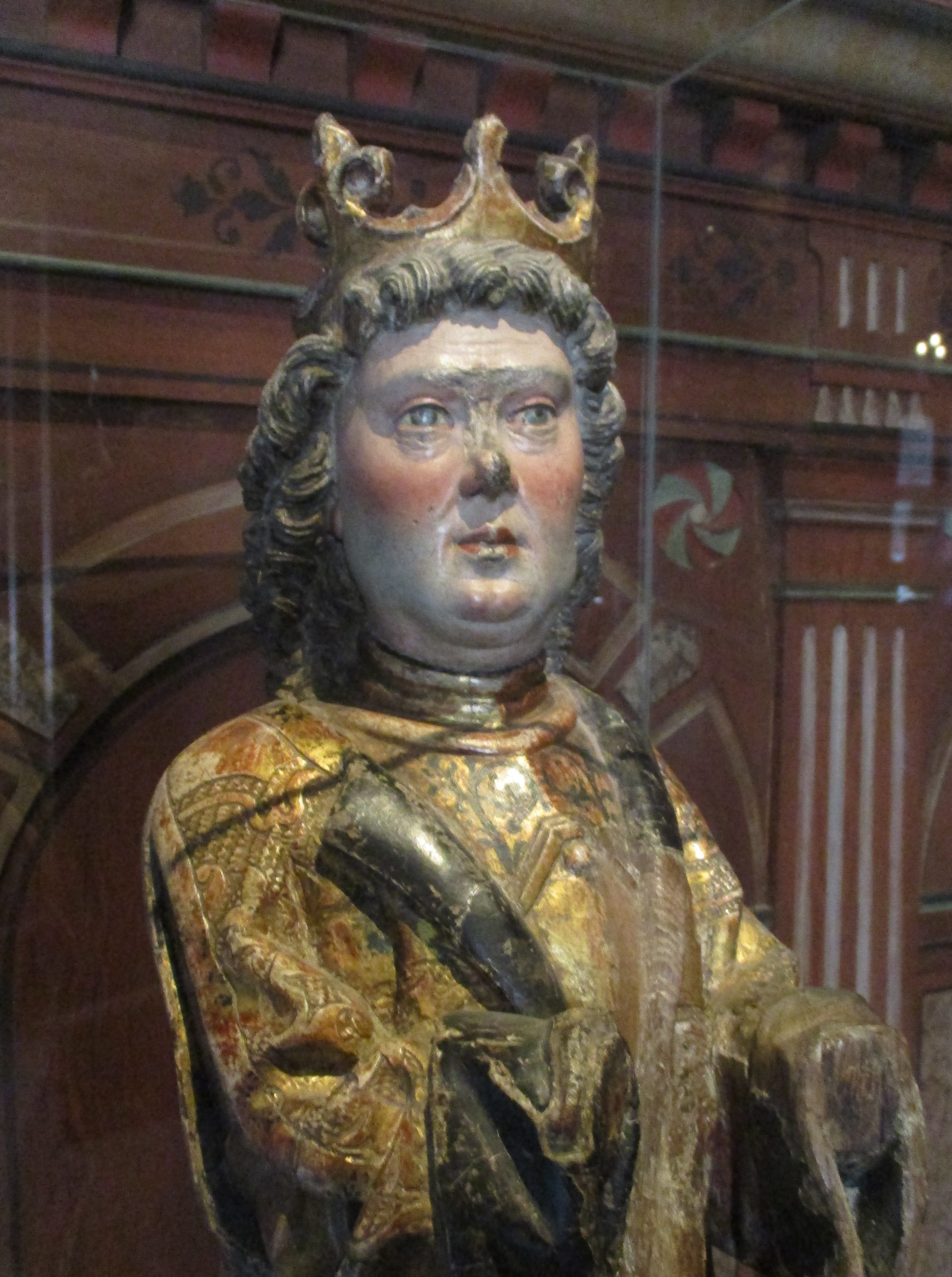
Wooden sculpture of Karl Knutsson by Bernt Notke

News of the uprising reached Knutsson when he was in Östergötland, and he now marched towards Nyköping and later Strängnäs with his entire force of 1,400 cavalry. He was later reinforced by an additional 300 men from Stockholm. However, he had lost precious time due to not being in Stockholm during the beginning of the uprising.

Once he reached Strängnäs, he established a camp near Älgsundet. However, Knutsson's scouts could not find the rebels. On 8 February during midnight, the scouts reported that the rebels were nowhere to be found.

=== Battle of Strängnäs/Älgsundet ===
After the scouts' reports, Karl Knutsson's troops went to rest with a false sense of security. However, right before the sunrise on 9 February, Oxenstierna's forces snuck into Karl Knutsson's camp and overwhelmed a large part of his forces. During the fighting, Knutsson was wounded by an arrow and forced to give up and flee.

=== Siege of Stockholm ===
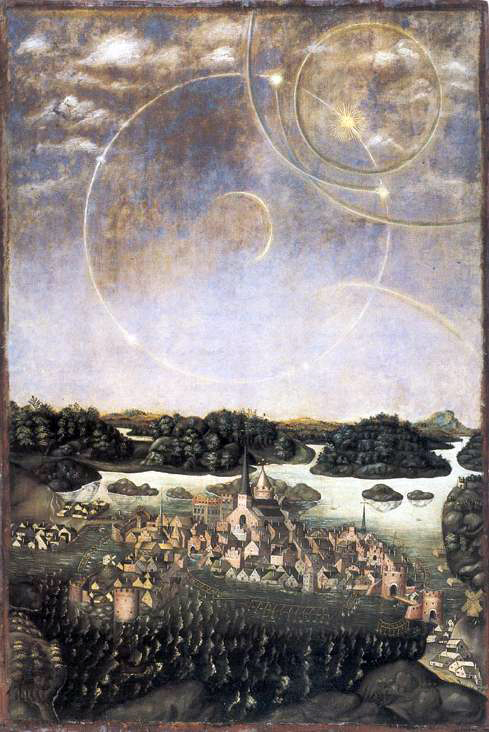
Vädersolstavlan , one of the earliest depictions of Stockholm in 1535, by Urban Målare

After the defeat, Karl Knutsson fled to Stockholm, where the burghers swore their loyalty to him and prepared for a siege. The "malmarna" were burned and the garrison awaited the arrival of Oxenstierna and his forces, which they did on 13 February. When they arrived, Knutsson immediately tried a sortie, which failed. On the night of 23 and 24 February, he fled the city due to his mistrust of the burgher's loyalty and went into exile. After Karl Knutsson's departure, Olof Drake, who was the commander of Stockholm's castle, entrusted it to Arendt Bengtsson and Örjan Karlsson.

== Aftermath ==
In the early morning of 24 February, Stockholm opened its gates to Oxenstierna's forces after Karlsson had been captured. After some weeks of resistance, Arendt Bengtsson and Olof Drake surrendered Stockholm's castle. Through the capitulation act on March 15th, Jöns Bengtsson, Olof Drake, and other "royal men" were promised no harm, security for their properties and person, and exemption from retribution or responsibility. This capitulation definitively ended the fighting over Sweden's throne. Viborg was the only fortress left supporting Knutsson, which was forced to capitulate by Erik Axelsson Tott. Christian I would be elected king of Sweden on 23 June after a Danish fleet arrived at Stockholm.

Karl Knutsson would depart to Danzig (modern-day Gdańsk), bringing with him as much of the Swedish treasury as possible.

== See also ==
- Attack on Stockholm (1452) – 1452 attack on Stockholm
- War of Deposition against Karl Knutsson (1464–1465) – Uprising against Karl Knutsson 1464-1465
- War of Deposition against Jöns Bengtsson Oxenstierna – 1466–1467 rebellion against Jöns Bengtsson Oxenstierna

== Works cited ==
- Adolfsson, Mats (2007). När borgarna brann [When the towns burned]. Svenska uppror (in Swedish). Vol. 1. Natur & Kultur. ISBN 9789127026315.
- Sundberg, Ulf (2010). Sveriges krig 1448-1630 [Sweden's wars 1448-1630] (in Swedish). Svenskt militärhistoriskt bibliotek. ISBN 9789185789627.
- Styffe, Carl Gustaf [in Swedish] (1870). Sverige under Karl Knutsson och Kristiern af Oldenburg, 1448-1470 [Sweden under Karl Knutsson and Christian of Oldenburg, 1448-1470]. Bidrag till Skandinaviens historia ur utländska arkiver (in Swedish). Stockholm: Norstedts förlag.
- Larsson, Lars-Olof (2003). Kalmarunionens tid: Från Drottning Margareta till Kristian II [The Era of the Kalmar Union: From Queen Margaretha to Christian II] (in Swedish). Norstedts. ISBN 9789151842172.
- Harrison, Dick (2014). "Karl Knutssons fall år 1457" [Fall of Karl Knutsson in 1457]. blog.svd.se (in Swedish). Svenska Dagbladet.
- Hildebrand, Bengt [in Swedish] (1945). "Olof Drake". sok.riksarkivet.se. National Archives of Sweden.
