= War of Deposition against Karl Knutsson (1464–1465) =

Uprising against Karl Knutsson 1464-1465

Second war of Deposition against Karl Knutsson
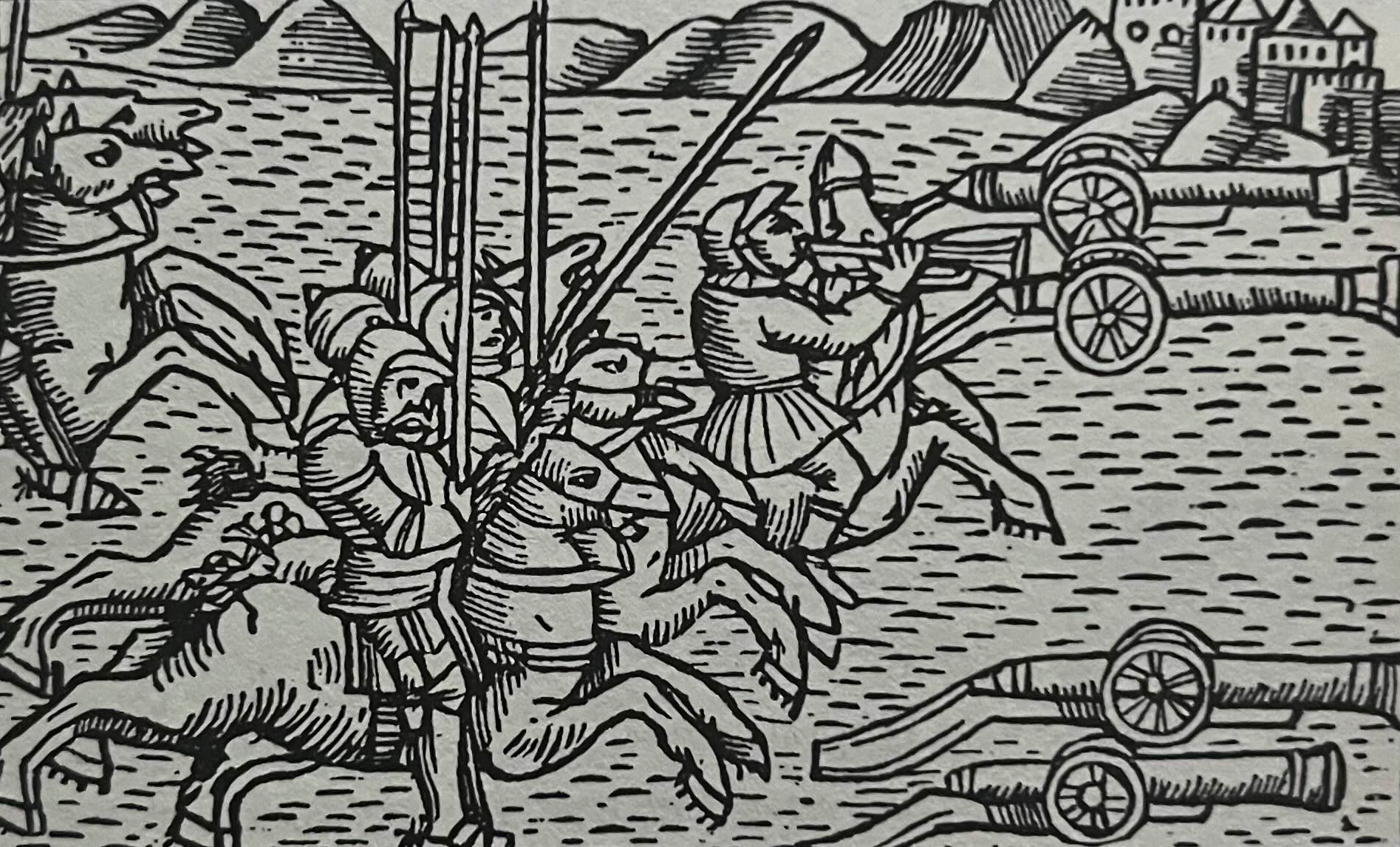
- Depiction of the battle off Stockholm in 1465 by Olaus Magnus
Date	December 1464 – January 1465
Location	Sweden
Result	Rebel victory
Territorial changes	Karl Knutsson is deposed by the rebels; Karl Knutsson receives Satakunta, Raseborg Castle and Korsholm Castle

Belligerents
Sweden	Rebels under Jöns Oxenstierna

Commanders and leaders
Karl Knutsson; Bo Djure (POW)	Jöns Bengtsson Oxenstierna; Kettil Karlsson Vasa; Ivar Gren; David Bengtsson Oxenstierna; Trotte Karlsson; Erik Nilsson Oxenstierna

Units involved
Stockholm garrison	Unknown

Strength
Unknown	Unknown

Casualties and losses
Heavy	Unknown

The Second War of Deposition against Karl Knutsson (Swedish: Andra avsättningskriget mot Karl Knutsson) occurred in the winter of 1464–1465. It began after Karl Knutsson once again became the king of Sweden after being invited by a rebel army besieging Stockholm. When Jöns Bengtsson Oxenstierna began preparing to depose Karl Knutsson, Knutsson sent a force under the command of Bo Djure towards Uppsala, where they captured Oxenstierna's residence and fought a battle at Uppsala. After, the rebels attacked Stockholm, and eventually Karl Knutsson agreed to renounce the throne in exchange for Satakunta and the castles of Raseborg and Korsholm.

== Background ==
On 2 July 1464, a letter was sent to Karl Knutsson from a rebel army besieging Stockholm, with Knutsson being offered the Swedish throne if he returned. Knutsson eagerly accepted and began preparations to return. In August, he arrived in Stockholm with his fleet. The garrison inside believed it to be a Danish relief fleet, and they were disappointed when it turned out to be Knutsson. Despite being considered a better alternative to Christian I, the noblemen distanced themselves.

== Deposition ==
In mid-November, Jöns Bengtsson Oxenstierna returned to Sweden, and immediately began preparing a new military action towards Knutsson. He attempted to gather forces with varying success. His own chapter had also sworn loyalty to Knutsson. In Västergötland, however, Oxenstierna had many sympathizers and people began arming themselves in the north to support Knutsson.

In order to win a quick decisive victory, Knutsson sent an army in December under the command of Bo Djure towards Uppsala to "render Jöns Bengtsson harmless". Before Djure arrived, Oxenstierna managed to flee to Västerås castle, and Djure captured his residence there, but Kettil Karlsson, Ivar Gren, David Bengtsson Oxenstierna, and Trotte Karlsson, his allies, marched towards Uppsala.

=== Battle of Uppsala ===
On 13 December, fighting broke out. Not much is known, but Djure is likely to have won a military victory over the rebels and signed a truce with them, which expired on 6–13 January 1465. Other sources claim the battle ended inconclusively.

=== Battle of Stockholm ===
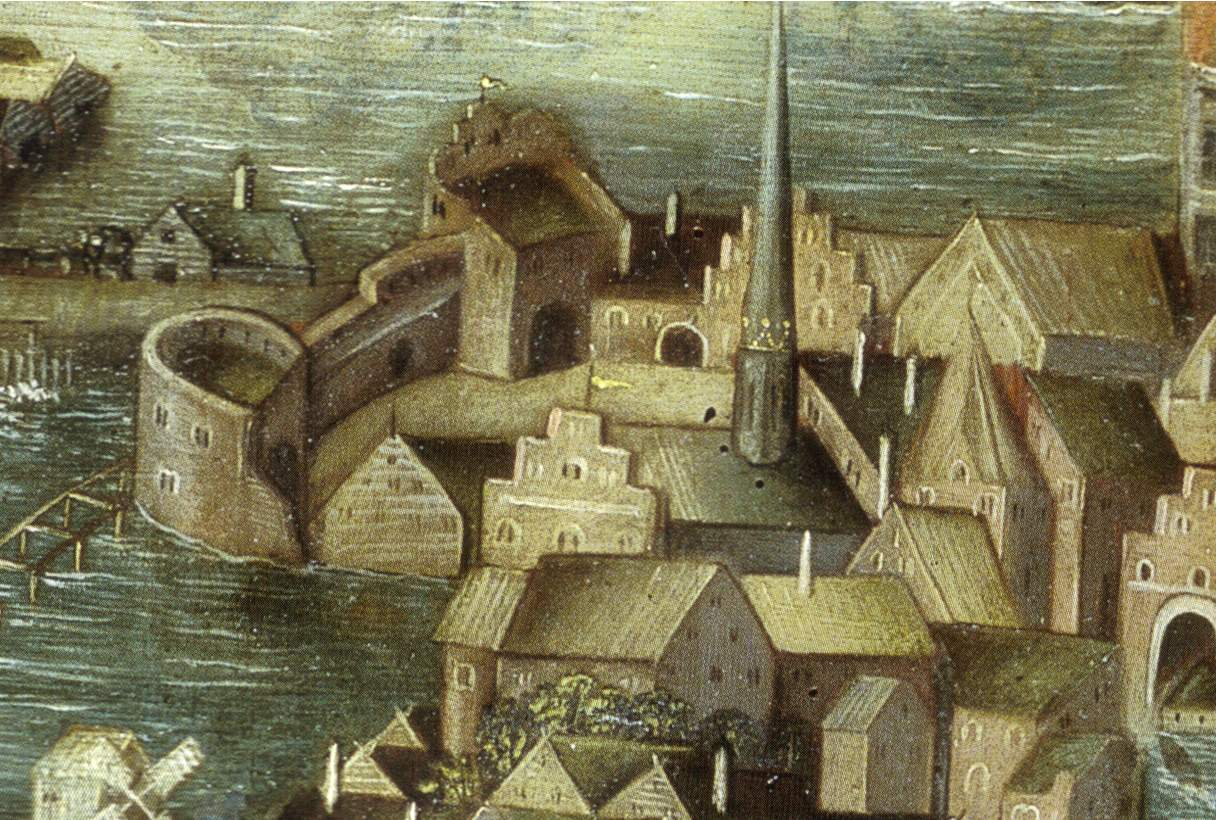
Helgeandsholmen as depicted in the Vädersolstavlan by Urban Målare

In 1465, when Djure was marching back towards Stockholm, the truce was broken and he was amnushed at Flottbro by Kettil Karlsson and barely escaped. On 4 January, the rebels assembled all the men they could outside of Stockholm and fighting over the ice began. Ivar Gren attacked Gråmunkeholmen (modern-day Riddarholmen) and Erik Nilsson Oxenstierna marched to Helgeandsholmen. Simultaneously, Ture Turesson Bielke made a sortie from Stockholm's castle. Helgeandsholmen quickly fell but Bo Djure fiercely defended Gråmunkeholmen. When Erik Nilsson left Helgeandsholmen to support Ivar Gren, Stockholm's burghers recaptured Helgeandsholmen.

== Negotiations ==
After the fighting, negoations were initiated. Karl Knutsson accepted an offer where he would receive Raseborg Castle, Turku Castle, and Norrbotten in compensation for renouncing the throne. Right before signing the agreement, Knutsson was notified that the Dalecarlians, supported by peasants from Roslagen, were on their way. During the negotiations, Kettil Karlsson and Gren entered the city with hostages. When they entered, however, bitterness erupted, and Bo Djure along with the hostages were taken into custody.

=== Renewed fighting ===
Due to these reinforcements, Karl Knutsson ended the negotiations and did a sortie from Stockholm towards Södermalm and Kungsholmen. His plan was to attack Oxenstierna's forces from the rear, which turned out to be a bad decision. They quickly realized what Knutsson was doing and counterattacked, during which many of Knutsson's men died. Despite the reinforcements not having arrived yet, Knutsson didn't give up hope for a final victory. When the peasants finally arrived outside Stockholm, Kettil Karlsson met with them and began negotiations at Rotebro, during which he convinced them to go back home after being promised that Christian I would never regain the throne and that Knutsson would not be harmed. Other sources claim that instead of negotiations, the rebels fought the peasants and forced them to retreat.

== Aftermath ==
After his sudden defeat, Knutsson's situation had completely changed. The terms of the agreement were now changed to ones where he would instead receive Satakunta and the castles of Raseborg and Korsholm in exchange for renouncing the throne. In January 1465, he renounced the throne, and Oxenstierna and Kettil Karlsson took power in Sweden. The former became practically Sweden's most powerful man.

== See also ==
- War of Deposition against Karl Knutsson – Uprising against Karl Knutsson in 1457
- War of Deposition against Jöns Bengtsson Oxenstierna – 1466–1467 rebellion against Jöns Bengtsson Oxenstierna

== Works cited ==
- Sundberg, Ulf (2010). Sveriges krig 1448-1630 [Sweden's wars 1448-1630] (in Swedish). Svenskt militärhistoriskt bibliotek. ISBN 9789185789627.
- Adolfsson, Mats (2007). När borgarna brann [When the towns burned]. Svenska uppror (in Swedish). Vol. 1. Natur & Kultur. ISBN 9789127026315.
- Styffe, Carl Gustaf [in Swedish] (1870). Sverige under Karl Knutsson och Kristiern af Oldenburg, 1448-1470 [Sweden under Karl Knutsson and Christian of Oldenburg, 1448-1470]. Bidrag till Skandinaviens historia ur utländska arkiver (in Swedish). Stockholm: Norstedts förlag.
- Nordström, Elsa (1949). "Trotte Karlsson (Eka-släkt)". sok.riksarkivet.se. National Archives of Sweden.
