= Elin Gustavsdotter =

Swedish noblewoman (died 1495)

Elin Gustavsdotter Sture (died 1495) was a Swedish noblewoman and consort of the regent Erik Axelsson (Tott).

== Biography ==
Elin Gustavsdotter was the daughter of the nobleman Gustav Algotsson of the influential Sture family. She was married to Erik Axelsson Tott in September 1466 in a marriage alliance arranged to strengthen Axelsson's position and support within the Swedish nobility; the same year, he was elected Regent by the Swedish nobility. Lady Elin thereby became first lady and took the part of a queen within the Swedish court. In 1467 her spouse resigned his position as Regent in favour of King Charles VIII and became governor of the eastern border provinces in Finland. The couple had no known children.

== Other sources ==
Litet lexikon över Sveriges regenter" av Lars O. Lagerqvist och Nils Åberg

Elin Gustavsdotter Born: 15th century Died: 1495
Preceded by Dorothea of Brandenburg as Queen consort	Regent consort of Sweden; 1466–1467	Succeeded by Christina Abrahamsdotter as Queen consort
