= Christina of Sweden (disambiguation) =

Christina was Queen of Sweden in her own right from 1632 until her abdication in 1654.

Christina of Sweden may also refer to:

== Other queens ==
- Christina Björnsdotter, Queen consort of Sweden around from 1156 until 1160
- Christina Hvide, Queen consort of Sweden from 1164 until 1167
- Christina Abrahamsdotter, Queen consort of Sweden in 1470
- Christina of Saxony, Queen consort of Sweden from 1497 until 1501
- Christina of Holstein-Gottorp, Queen consort of Sweden from 1604 until 1611

== Princesses ==
- Christina Ingesdotter (died 1122), Swedish princess
- Christina, daughter of Birger Jarl
- Christina, wife of Prince Valdemar, Duke of Finland.
- Christina (c. 1432 – before 1500), daughter of King Karl Knutsson of Sweden
- Christina of Denmark (1521–1590), Swedish princess
- Christina (1593–1594), daughter of King Charles IX of Sweden
- Christina (1623–1624), daughter of King Gustavus Adolphus of Sweden
- Princess Christina, Mrs. Magnuson (born 1943), Swedish princess
