= Tord Pedersson (Bonde) =

The Most Reverend Tord Pedersson (Bonde)
- Archbishop of Uppsala; Primate of Sweden
- Church: Roman Catholic
- Archdiocese: Uppsala
- Appointed: 1468
- In office: 1468–1469
- Predecessor: Jöns Bengtsson Oxenstierna
- Successor: Jakob Ulvsson

Orders
- Consecration: Not Consecrated
- Rank: Metropolitan Archbishop

Personal details
- Died: May 1470
- Coat of arms

Tord Pedersson (Bonde) (died May 1470) was the un-ordained Archbishop of Uppsala from 1468 to 1469. He was born as Tord Pedersson, but since his mother was of the Bonde family, he would often use this name in addition to his own.

He studied at the University of Leipzig in 1437–1439 and received a Bachelor of Arts. After returning home, he became dean in Linköping. His mother had a connection to the king Charles VIII of Sweden, which is believed to have been the reason for this promotion.

In 1467, the Archbishop of Uppsala died, and on the King's recommendation, Tord Pedersson was elected as his successor. He moved to Almarestäket and filled the chair as Archbishop. However, Pope Paul II did not approve this elevation, and requested that Pedersson be replaced by Jakob Ulvsson. Pedersson was replaced on 18 December 1469. Not long thereafter, Tord Pedersson died.

== See also ==
- List of archbishops of Uppsala
