= Nils Jönsson =

Nils Jönsson may refer to:

- Nils Jönsson (Oxenstierna), Swedish statesman and co-regent of Sweden
- Nils Jönsson i Rossbol (1893–1957), Swedish politician
- Nils Jonsson (football), Swedish football manager
