= Queen Christina =

Queen Christina, Queen Christine or Queen Cristina may refer to:

== Queens regnant ==
- Christina, Queen of Sweden (1626–1689), Queen regnant of Sweden, reigned 1632–1654

== Queens consort ==
- Christina of Denmark, Queen of Norway (c. 1118–1139), Queen consort of Norway, spouse of King Magnus IV of Norway
- Christina of Denmark, Queen of Sweden (c. 1120/25–1170), Queen consort of Sweden, spouse of King Eric IX of Sweden
- Christina Hvide (c. 1145–c. 1200), Queen consort of Sweden, spouse of King Charles VII of Sweden
- Christina of Norway (died 1213), titular queen consort of Norway, spouse of co-regent King Philip Simonsson
- Christina Abrahamsdotter (1432–1492), Queen consort of Sweden, spouse of King Charles VIII of Sweden
- Christina of Saxony (1461–1521), Queen consort of Denmark, Sweden and Norway, spouse of King John of Denmark
- Christina of Holstein-Gottorp (1573–1625), Queen consort of Sweden, spouse of King Charles IX of Sweden
- Maria Christina of Austria (1858–1929), Queen consort of Spain, spouse of King Alfonso XII of Spain

== Others ==
- Queen Christina (film) – a 1933 film loosely based upon the life of Queen Christina of Sweden, starring Greta Garbo.
- SS Queen Cristina (disambiguation)
