= Attack on Stockholm (1452) =

1452 attack on Stockholm

- Part of the Dano-Swedish War of 1449–1457
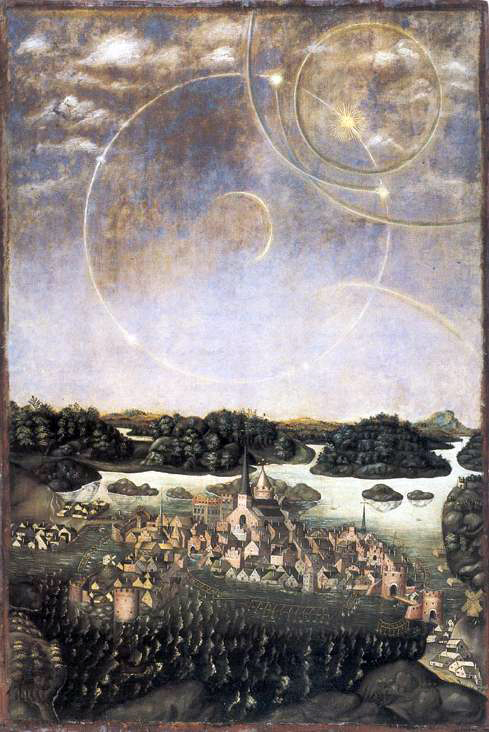
- Stockholm as depicted in the Vädersolstavlan in 1535 by Urban målare
Date	Summer 1452
Location	Stockholm, Sweden
Result	Swedish victory
Territorial changes	Danish forces repulsed from Stockholm

Belligerents
Sweden	Denmark

Commanders and leaders
Karl Knutsson	Olof Axelsson; Magnus Gren

Units involved
Stockholm garrison	Mercenaries

Strength
36 ships Multiple smaller vessels	46 ships 1,900 men

Casualties and losses
Unknown	430 casualties

The attack on Stockholm occurred in the summer of 1452 during the Dano-Swedish war of 1449–1457. It began when a Danish fleet of 46 ships and 1,900 men arrived off the coast, managing to sail into the archipelago but being stopped at the "boom". After this, they successfully landed at Blasieholmen, where they initially repelled a group of peasants. However, these peasants were eventually reinforced by burghers from Stockholm, and the Danes were forced to retreat over a bridge where thirty Germans would drown and others killed by pitchforks.

== Background ==
On May 19, 1452, Karl Knutsson received news that Denmark had invaded Västergötland, after which he prepared to go on a ship to meet the Danes at Öland. However, the military commanders advised him to go westwards instead, and they decided that he would meet up with them at Tiveden a few days later. However, even before they had barely gathered there, they received news that a Danish fleet had arrived outside of Stockholm.

== Attack ==
The Danish fleet consisted of 46 ships with 1,900 men, commanded by Magnus Gren and Olof Axelsson. The fleet had likely previously been tasked with transferring the men to Sweden, and it had previously attacked Öland according to the "Lübeck Chronicle". However, due to the country being so well fortified, this attack had been repelled. The entrance to Stockholm had no defenses at the time, and the Danes were able to sail into the harbour without issues. When they attempted to breach the so-called "boom" with 16 ships, they were repelled. They also attempted to break through at Skeppsholmen and Vångsön which failed.

However, the Danes managed to land at Käpplingen (modern-day Blasieholmen), being separated from Norrmalm at the time. It seemed that they intended to attack Stockholm from the north. When a group of peasants tried building a bridge across the channel to repel the Danes, they were suddenly attacked and forced to flee in a panic. The Danes continued chasing them into Norrmalm, however, Stockholm's burghers soon came to their aid. The peasants regained their courage and a large number of Danes were thrown into the water as the hastily retreated across the bridge. Others died from pitchforks. During the retreat, some thirty Germans drowned in the channel.

After receiving news of the attack, Karl Knutsson marched to Stockholm in a matter of four days to defend it. However, Olof Axelsson had been warned by his daughter, Birgitta, who was married to Erengisle Nilsson, the commander of Örebro. This warning allowed the Danes to withdraw and set up position at Stegesund or Stäksund. Knutsson ordered 35–36 ships and other smaller vessels to pursue the Danish fleet as far out as possible. By the time these arrived, however, the Danes had disappeared. According to the Lübeck Chronicle, more than 400 Danes had died off Stockholm.

== Aftermath ==
After the failed attack, the Danes sailed to Västerås, capturing and razing the town. The Danes also planned a landing on Öland, but it was repelled by the locals. By the end of the summer, the fleet was recalled to the Sound to return the troops.

== Works cited ==
- Styffe, Carl Gustaf [in Swedish] (1870). Sverige under Karl Knutsson och Kristiern af Oldenburg, 1448-1470 [Sweden under Karl Knutsson and Christian of Oldenburg, 1448-1470]. Bidrag till Skandinaviens historia ur utländska arkiver (in Swedish). Stockholm: Norstedts förlag.
- Mellin, Gustaf Henrik (1841). Stockholm and its environs: Comprehending the history and curiosities of the capital and its neighbourhood. Stockholm: The British Library.
- Gyllengranat, C.A. (1840). Sveriges Sjökrigs-historia [Sweden's Naval History] (in Swedish). Karlskrona: Georg Ameen & Comp.
- Sundberg, Ulf (2010). Sveriges krig 1448-1630 [Sweden's wars 1448-1630] (in Swedish). Svenskt militärhistoriskt bibliotek. ISBN 9789185789627.
