= Carl of Finland =

Carl of Finland (Swedish: Karl av Finland) may refer to:

- Charles VIII of Sweden, interregnum County Lord of Finland
- Carl Gustav, Great Prince of Finland, son of King Gustav IV Adolf of Sweden (died young)
