= Bengt Jönsson (Oxenstierna) =

Swedish statesman and noble (1390s–1450s)

Bengt Jönsson Oxenstierna
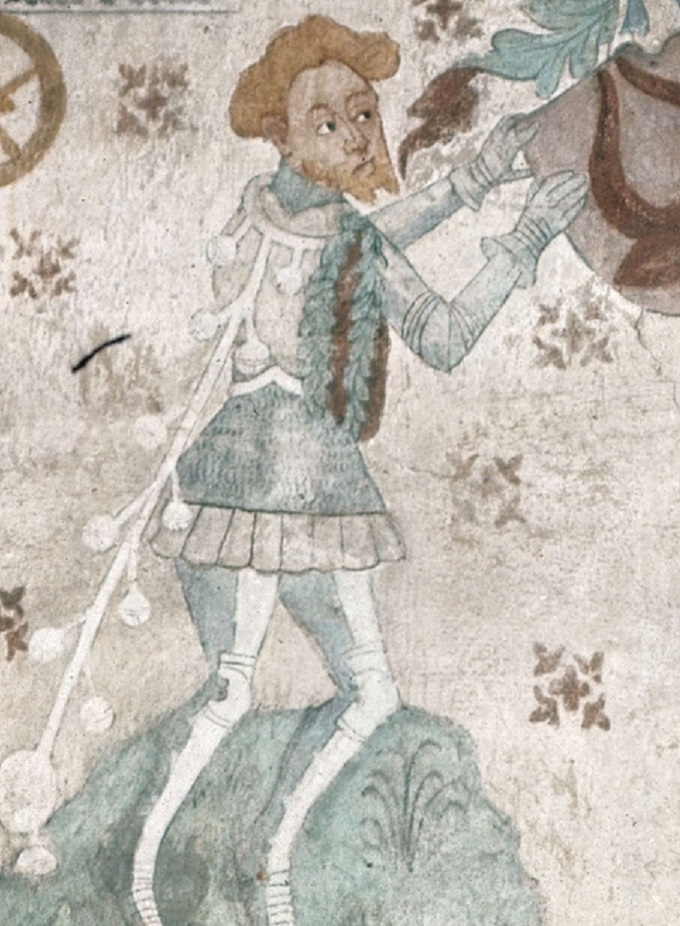
- Bengt Jönsson Oxenstierna as depicted in Tensta Church

Co-regent of Sweden
- In office January 1448 – June 1448 Serving with Nils Jönsson Oxenstierna
- Preceded by: Christopher of Bavaria
- Succeeded by: Charles VIII of Sweden

Personal details
- Born: Approximately 1390s
- Died: Approximately 1450s
- Family: Oxenstierna

Bengt Jönsson (Oxenstierna) (1390s–1450s) was a Swedish statesman and noble. Under the Kalmar Union, he served as co-regent of Sweden from January to June 1448, together with his brother Nils Jönsson (Oxenstierna). He was a member of the Privy Council of Sweden from 1435 and magistrate of Uppland in 1439. He was dubbed as knight by King Christopher of Bavaria following his coronation in 1441, and Master of the Royal Court from the same year.

His farm was Salsta manor (Salsta slott) at Lena parish in Norunda, Uppland. He made large donations to Tensta Church (Tensta kyrka) and was featured in a fresco made in 1437 by the artist Johannes Rosenrod.

In 1416, he married Kristina Kristiernsdotter (Vasa), widow of Karl Stensson Blad, with whom he had four sons, including Jöns Bengtsson Oxenstierna, Archbishop of Uppsala (1448–1467).

== See also ==
- Oxenstierna

Bengt Jönsson (Oxenstierna) House of Oxenstierna Born: 1390s Died: 1450
Regnal titles
Preceded by Christopher of Bavaria as King of Sweden	Co-regent of Sweden; 1448 with Nils Jönsson (Oxenstierna)	Succeeded by Karl Knutsson as King of Sweden
