= Oxenstierna =

Swedish noble family

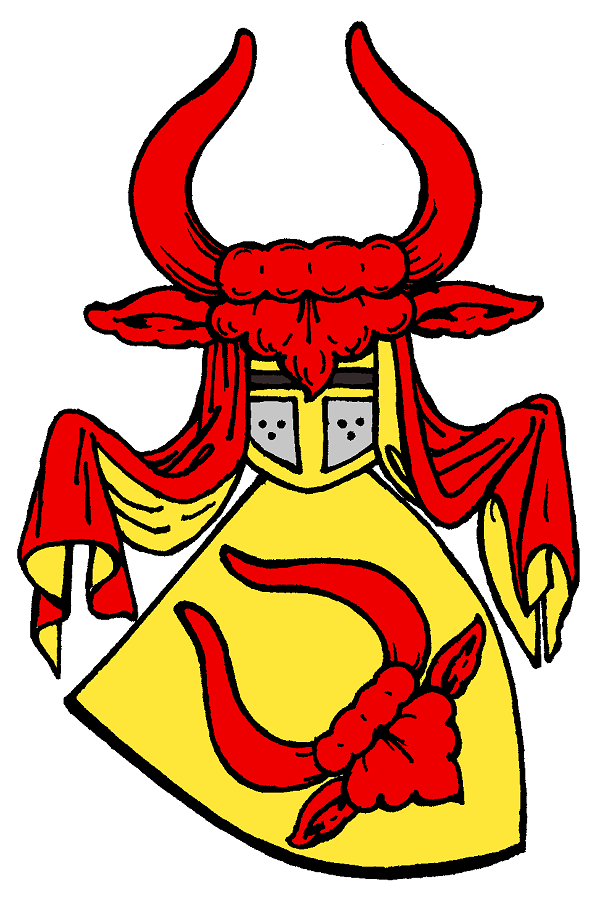
The coat of arms of the Oxenstierna family

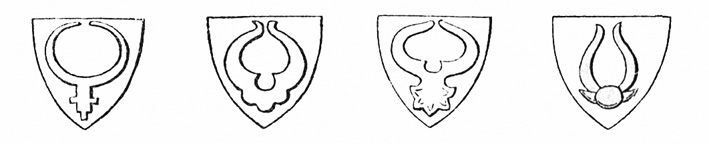
Seal of Oxenstierna

The Oxenstierna family (US: /ˈʊksənʃɛərnə, ˈɒk-/ UUK-sən-shair-nə, OK-, Swedish: [ˈʊ̂ksɛnˌɧæːɳa]) is a Swedish noble family, originally from Småland in southern Sweden, and is part of the Swedish uradel, the ancient nobility.

== History ==
The Oxenstierna family held vast estates in Södermanland and Uppland during the late Middle Ages and Renaissance. In the 15th century, the family at times held the position of Regent of Sweden during the turbulent civil wars of the Kalmar Union. The family began to adopt its armorial designation of Oxenstierna as a personal surname towards the end of the 16th century. In the case of earlier members of the family, the surname has been retroactively applied by historians.

== Notable Oxenstierna family members ==
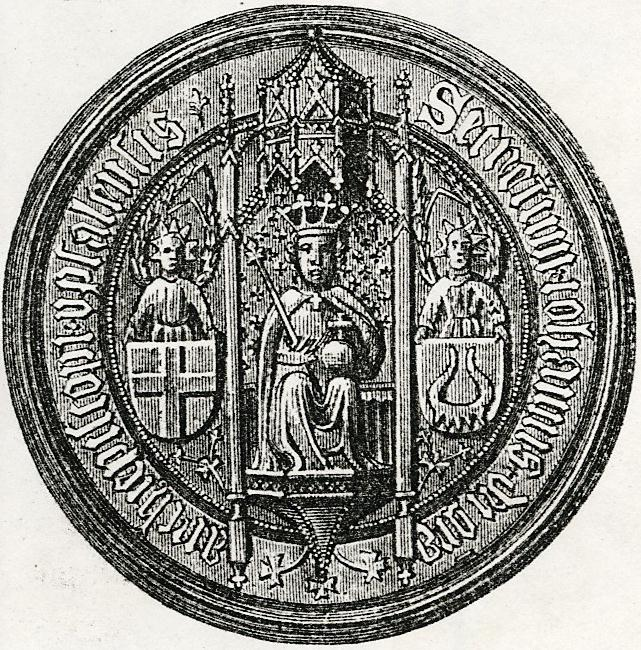
Great seal of Jöns Bengtsson Oxenstierna (1417–1467), Archbishop of Uppsala and Lord Regent of Sweden.

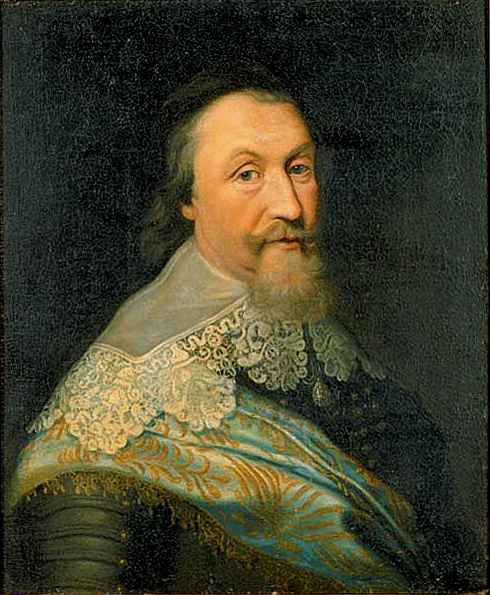
Axel Oxenstierna, (1583–1654), Swedish statesman and influential Protestant leader during the Thirty Years' War

Several members of the family, most notably the influential Lord High Chancellor Axel Oxenstierna, rose to prominence, high political office and titles during the age of the Swedish Empire in the 17th century.

The family's most notable members include the following (in chronological order):

- Jöns Bengtsson (Oxenstierna) the Elder, (?–1399), knight.
- Bengt Jönsson Oxenstierna, (1390s–1450), statesman, Privy Councillor and Lawspeaker of Uppland, Co-regent of Sweden.
- Nils Jönsson Oxenstierna, (1390s–1450s), statesman and Privy Councillor, Co-regent of Sweden, brother of Bengt Jönsson.
- Jöns Bengtsson Oxenstierna, (1417–1467), Archbishop of Uppsala, Privy Councillor, canon law scholar and statesman, Lord Regent of Sweden, son of Bengt Jönsson.
- Kristiern Bengtsson (Oxenstierna) the Younger, (c. 1475–1520), Privy Councillor, executed during the Stockholm Bloodbath.
- Gabriel Kristiernsson Oxenstierna (c. 1500–1585), Baron, Privy Councillor, Admiral and Lord Lieutenant of Estonia.
- Gustaf Gabrielsson (Oxenstierna) (1551–1597), Privy Councillor, Lord Lieutenant of Estonia, father of Axel Gustafsson.
- Axel Gustafsson Oxenstierna, 1st Count of Södermöre (1583–1654), influential statesman and Lord High Chancellor during the age of the Swedish Empire, head of the regency council and de facto regent during Queen Christina's minority.
- Gabriel Gustafsson Oxenstierna, (1587–1640), statesman and Lord High Steward of Sweden, brother of Axel Gustafsson.
- Gabriel Bengtsson Oxenstierna, 1st Count of Korsholm and Vasa (1586–1656), Lord High Admiral and Lord High Treasurer, 1st cousin of Axel Gustafsson.
- Bengt Bengtsson Oxenstierna, Baron of Eka and Lindö (1591–1643), diplomat and Privy Councillor, Governor-General of Ingria and Livonia.
- Beata Oxenstierna (1591–1652), Mistress of the Robes to Queen Christina of Sweden.
- Johan Axelsson Oxenstierna, Count of Södermöre, (1611–1657), diplomat, Governor-General of Swedish Pomerania, Marshal of the Realm, son of Axel Gustafsson.
- Erik Axelsson Oxenstierna, Count of Södermöre (1624–1656), Lord High Chancellor of Sweden, Governor-General of Prussia, son of Axel Gustafsson.
- Bengt Gabrielsson Oxenstierna, Count of Korsholm and Vasa (1623–1702), President of the Royal Swedish Chancellery, Military Governor of Warsaw.
- Christiana Oxenstierna af Korsholm och Vasa (1661–1701), teacher and noblewoman, famous for marrying a non-noble vicar.
- Johan Gabriel Oxenstierna (1750–1818), Count, poet, statesman, and diplomat, member of the Swedish Academy.
- Johan Gabriel Oxenstierna (1899–1995), Count, naval officer and pentathlete, Olympic gold medalist in modern pentathlon 1932.

== Connection to European royal houses ==
Kings Christian IX of Denmark, Haakon VII of Norway, and Carl XVI Gustaf of Sweden were all descended from branches of the Oxenstierna family. All three monarchs descended from the Oxenstierna family through their common ancestor, Friedrich Wilhelm, Duke of Schleswig-Holstein-Sonderburg-Glücksburg. His paternal grandmother was Countess Charlotte of Dohna-Schlobitten, great-great-granddaughter of Gabriel Bengtsson Oxenstierna, 1st Count of Korsholma and Vaasa, father of Bengt Gabrielsson and first cousin of Axel and Bengt Gustafssöner, as well as great-great-great-great-grandson of regent Bengt Jönsson. Oxenstierna was also a distant relative of Charles VIII of Sweden, Frederick VIII of Denmark, Queen Alexandra of the United Kingdom, George I of Greece, and Empress Maria Feodorovna of Russia.
