= Tott's Russian wars =

Two wars between Sweden and Russia

- Part of the Russo-Swedish Wars
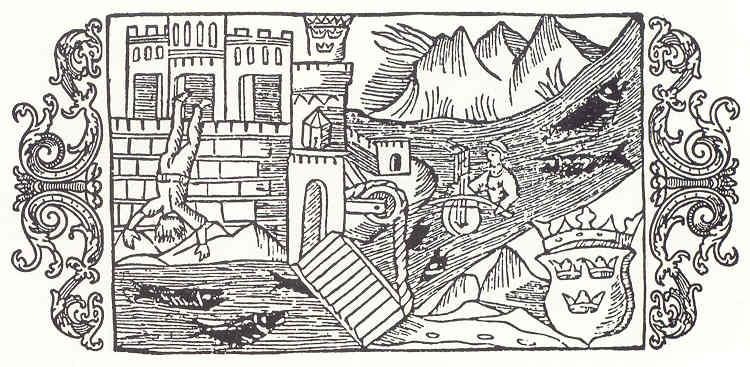
- Olofsborg castle (modern-day Olavinlinna) by Olaus Magnus in 1555
| Date | 1475–1476; 1479–1482 |
| Location | Olofsborg (present-day Olavinlinna, Finland) |
| Result | 1475-1476 Swedish victory 1479-1482 Inconclusive |
| Territorial changes | Russians are repulsed from Olofsborg |

Belligerents
| (History of Sweden (800–1521)) Sweden | Novgorod Republic; Grand Principality of Moscow |

Commanders and leaders
| (History of Sweden (800–1521)) Erik Axelsson Tott # (History of Sweden (800–1521)) Lars Axelsson Tott (History of Sweden (800–1521)) Erik Karlsson Vasa | Ivan III |

Units involved
| (History of Sweden (800–1521)) Olofsborg garrison | Unknown |

Strength
| First war Unknown Second war 24,000 men | Unknown |

Casualties and losses
| Unknown | Thousands killed |

Tott's Russian wars (Swedish: Totts ryska krig) refers to two wars waged by Swedish military commander Erik Axelsson Tott: the first war with the Novgorod Republic (1475–1476), and the second war with the Grand Principality of Moscow (1479–1482).

== Background ==
After Erik Axelsson Tott became the commander of Viborg in 1457, the Swedish relations with Novgorod became more strained. Despite a peace treaty being signed in 1468, the Novgorodians carried out numerous attacks on the border in the same year. The tension between the two increased further when a truce that had been signed in 1458 expired in 1473.

== Wars ==
=== Tott's first Russian war ===
In 1475, Erik Axelsson Tott began construction of a fortress in the inner parts of Finland, which was named Olofsborg (Finnish: Olavinlinna) or Nyslott. It was located on an islet in the strait between Saimaa and Haukivesi. It was unclear whether it should have been considered in Swedish or Novgorodian territory. In any event, the construction led to an increased amount of Novgorodian military activity in the area. In Sweden proper, a new tax was required for the defenses in the east and new troops were mobilized for this purpose. It is highly likely that the commander of these troops was the knight Erik Karlsson Vasa.

In 1475, the Novgorodians complained that the fortress had been built on their territory. During the same year they made an incursion into Finland and were "cruel" according to one report. This incursion seems to have been more dangerous than normal, since Erik Axelsson Tott quickly hired the Bishop of Åbo and several Finnish nobles to inform the Government about what had happened. He also requested a rescue from the mainland, then further asked for aid. When this aid arrived, it was used too late, with hostilities continuing through the winter. In the spring of 1476, there was a new request for aid. It was likely around this period that Erik Karlsson Vasa performed his highly praised feats that are mentioned in the Rhyming Chronicle.

It was also in this time that Sten Sture sent envoys to Novgorod for the restoration of peace. Grand Prince Ivan III received the Swedish messengers kindly and commanded the archbishop to extend and renew the truce for a few years.

=== Tott's second Russian war ===
The construction of Olofsborg continued despite the renewed peace signed in 1476. It remained a thorn in the side of the Russians. Erik Axelsson Tott expected a large Russian attack. In anticipation of this, Olofsborg was strengthened from a dirt and wooden fortress to one built from stone.

The peace would not last long. In 1479, the Russians raided around the area of Olofsborg. Details of the raiding are unknown. As revenge for this raid, Erik Axelsson Tott carried out an attack into Russia in the autumn of 1480. He had earlier received large reinforcements from Sweden, amounting to upwards of 24,000 men. He went raiding into Russian territory, going as far as 100 to 120 kilometers or 24 miles. According to Olaus Petri's chronicle, Erik Axelsson "killed both people and cattle, men and women, young and old, to several thousands" This account is most likely accurate due to the fighting on the eastern front having been extremely brutal. He also burned all the villages where he marched.

Erik Axelsson also forbade any shipping on the Neva and Narva rivers in the summer. This ban was renewed in the fall of 1481 by Lars Axelsson Tott after he had taken over command of Viborg when Erik Axelsson died in the spring of 1481. After taking command, Lars also continued the war. Despite his actions, the war did not turn into anything more serious. On January 17, 1482, the courtiers in Novgorod concluded a new truce with Lars for four years.

== Aftermath ==
Peace between Russia and Sweden would for the most part remain until 1495. An exception to this is a letter from peasants in Kemi, Ii, and Liminka parishes that complained about Russian raids in Ostrobothnia.

== Works cited ==
- Sundberg, Ulf (1998). Medeltidens svenska krig [Swedish wars in the Middle Ages] (in Swedish). Stockholm: Hjalmarson & Högberg. pp. 347/351–352. ISBN 9789189080263.
- Sundberg, Ulf (2010). Sveriges krig 1448-1630 [Sweden's wars 1448-1630] (in Swedish). Svenskt militärhistoriskt bibliotek. pp. 110/114–115. ISBN 9789185789627.
- Styffe, Carl Gustaf (1875). Bidrag till Skandinaviens historia ur utländska arkiver: Sverige i Sten Sture den äldres tid, 1470-1503 [Contribution to the history of Scandinavia from foreign archives: Sweden in the age of Sten Sture the Elder, 1470-1503] (in Swedish). Norstedts förlag. pp. XXXIX–XLI.
