= Charles of Norway =

Charles of Norway may refer to:

- Charles I of Norway (1409–1470), King of Sweden and Norway
- Charles II of Norway (1748–1818), King of Sweden and Norway
- Charles III of Norway (1763–1844), King of Sweden and Norway
- Charles IV of Norway (1826–1872), King of Sweden and Norway
