= Jöns Bengtsson Oxenstierna =

Archbishop of Uppsala from 1448 to 1467

Jöns Bengtsson
- Archbishop of Uppsala; Primate of Sweden
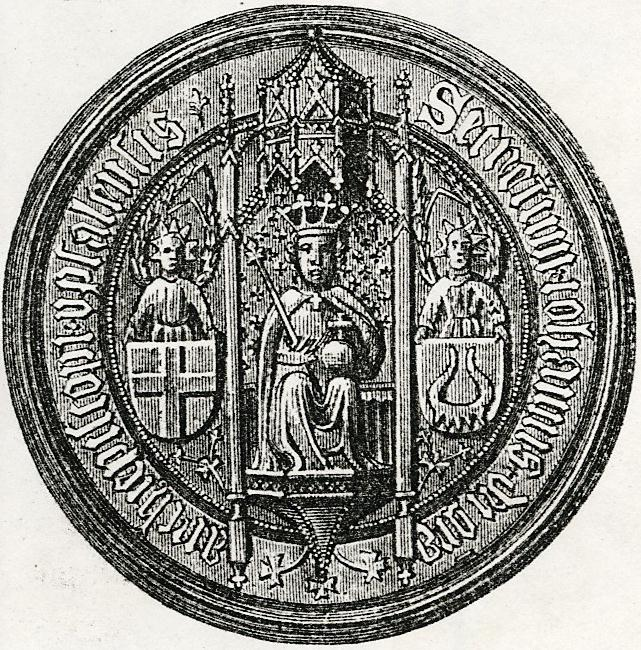
- Seal of Archbishop Jöns Bengtsson, displaying the arms of the Archdiocese of Uppsala (left) and the Oxenstierna family (right)
- Church: Roman Catholic
- Archdiocese: Uppsala
- Appointed: 1448
- In office: 1448–1467
- Predecessor: Nicolaus Ragvaldi
- Successor: Jakob Ulvsson

Orders
- Consecration: 30 June 1448
- Rank: Archbishop

Personal details
- Born: 1417 Sweden
- Died: 15 December 1467 (aged 49–50) Borgholm, Öland, Sweden
- Parents: Bengt Jönsson Oxenstierna; Kristina Kristiernsdotter (Vasa)
- Education: Leipzig University

Jöns Bengtsson (Oxenstierna), in Latin known as Johannes Benedicti de Salista, (1417 – 15 December 1467) was a Swedish clergyman, canon law scholar and statesman who served as Archbishop of Uppsala (1448–1467). He was also the regent of Sweden under the Kalmar Union in 1457, shared with Erik Axelsson (Tott), and alone from 1465 to 1466.

== Biography ==
=== Family ===
Jöns Bengtsson was a member of the illustrious Oxenstierna family, various representatives of which had already become prominent in the public life of Sweden. His father was Privy Councillor Bengt Jönsson Oxenstierna, Lord of Salsta, and his mother was Kristina Kristiernsdotter Vasa, daughter of Lord High Justiciar Kristiern Nilsson Vasa.

=== Education and academic career ===
He studied at the University of Leipzig and returned in 1438 to Sweden with a magister in artibus degree. On his return he was made Archpriest of the chapter of Uppsala Cathedral. Shortly afterwards his father was made Lawspeaker of the province of Uppland and Castellan of Ringstaholm Castle by the Privy Council. In 1440 he attended the Riksmöte in Arboga where the Danish King Christopher of Bavaria was elected King of Sweden, and took part in two Kalmar Union meetings in 1441 as a Swedish representative.

There are no Swedish sources mentioning Jöns Bengtsson in the period between 1442 and 1447, during which he likely returned to Germany to further his academic studies in canon law. He is mentioned as decretorum baccalaureus and Rector of the University of Leipzig for the summer term of 1445.

=== Archbishop ===
Shortly after his father Bengt Jönsson and uncle Nils Jönsson Oxenstierna were named Co-regents, Jöns Bengtsson was elected archbishop in February 1448. He asked the Council of Basel for a confirmation of his election, and he had himself consecrated (30 June 1448) by his suffragans, the day after they had crowned Charles VIII as King. On 1 July, Bengtsson crowned the queen. The confirmation of his appointment by Pope Nicholas V did not reach him until the ensuing year.

In 1457, as Archbishop of Uppsala, he received from the pope the title of Primate of Sweden; the Archbishops of Lund, however, were permitted to retain their title of Primate of the Church of Sweden.

As Charles, to escape from money troubles, increased taxes and confiscated church property, dissatisfaction spread among clergy and people, and Bengtsson placed himself at the head of the opposition (1457). Entering Uppsala Cathedral, he laid aside his pontifical insignia, took up helmet, breastplate, and sword, and announced his intention not to resume his pontifical robes until Charles should be banished from the country. The King was forced to yield and went into exile in Danzig. Thereupon Christian I of Denmark was formally recognized King of Sweden, and crowned at Stockholm by Bengtsson.

General discontent soon followed, especially when Christian, on becoming heir to his uncle, Duke Adolph of Holstein, found himself in great financial straits. To meet his obligations, he levied enormous taxes, even in Sweden, without exempting ecclesiastics, religious foundations, or the moneys collected by papal mandate to defray the expenses of a crusade against the Turks. During a temporary absence of Christian I in Finland, the archbishop held the regency of Sweden; seeing the people in revolt against him and the heavy imposts, he took up their cause and suspended the collection of taxes. The king showed his displeasure by arresting the archbishop and sending him to Denmark. A revolution broke out afresh in Sweden, led by his cousin Kettil Karlsson Vasa, Bishop of Linköping, who defeated Christian I's army at the Battle of Haraker in 1464, becoming de facto regent. Charles VIII was recalled to the throne, and Christian I, to recover the country, became reconciled with his prisoner. Bengtsson went at once to Sweden, where he roused the people against Charles, whom he excommunicated. The archbishop succeeded finally in bringing about Charles' abdication, and the recognition of Christian I once more as King of Sweden. In reality, however, the archbishop held the effective reins of power and administered affairs as though he were the actual sovereign. He was unable to sustain this rôle. Discontented factions combined against him and, in 1466, during a rebellion against him, elected Erik Axelsson Tott as regent, whereupon Bengtsson was compelled to retire. Dissensions continued, and the king of the Swedish party, Charles VIII, once more took the place of the king who represented the union of the three countries. The archbishop found an asylum with his friend Magnus Gren, on the island of Öland. Here he died at Borgholm on 15 December 1467, "poor and exiled, regretted by no one, hated by many, and feared by all".

== See also ==
- List of archbishops of Uppsala

Jöns Bengtsson Oxenstierna House of Oxenstierna Born: 1414 Died: 15 December 1467
Regnal titles
Preceded by Karl Knutsson as King of Sweden	Co-regent of Sweden; 1457 with Erik Axelsson Tott	Succeeded by Christian I as King of Sweden
Preceded by Kettil Karlsson (Vasa)	Regent of Sweden; 1465–1466	Succeeded by Erik Axelsson Tott
Catholic Church titles
Preceded by Nils Ragvaldsson	Archbishop of Uppsala; 1448–1467	Succeeded by Tord Pedersson (Bonde)
