= Jakob Ulvsson =

Archbishop of Uppsala from 1469 to 1515

The Most Reverend Jacob Ulfsson
- Archbishop of Uppsala; Primate of Sweden
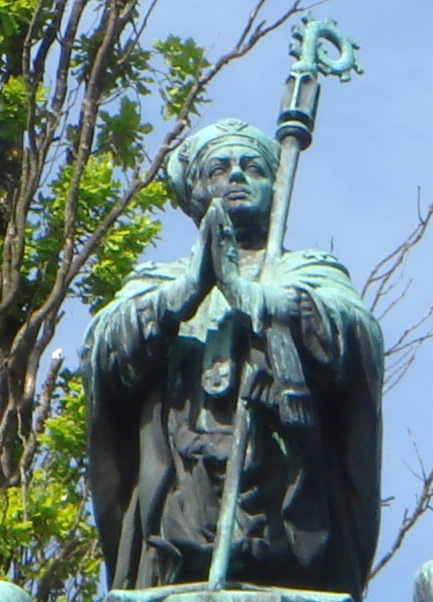
- Church: Roman Catholic
- Archdiocese: Uppsala
- Appointed: 18 December 1469
- In office: 1470–1515
- Predecessor: Jöns Bengtsson Oxenstierna
- Successor: Gustav Trolle

Orders
- Consecration: 15 April 1470 by Šimun Vosić
- Rank: Archbishop

Personal details
- Born: 1430s Uppland, Sweden
- Died: 1521 Mariefred, Sweden

Jakob Ulvsson (1430s – spring 1521) was the archbishop of Uppsala and primate of the Roman Catholic Church of Sweden from 1469 to 1515. He was also the founder of Uppsala University in 1477.

== Biography ==
Jakob Ulvsson came from a noble family background. He was born at Hacksta gård at Trögds härad in Uppland. He studied at the universities in Rostock (Bachelor of Arts in 1458/1459) and Paris (magister 1460).

He spent the years 1465–1470 in Rome and was meanwhile appointed Canon of Uppsala in 1465 and Archdeacon of Växjö in 1468. Despite King Karl Knutsson wanting to make one of his own relatives Archbishop of Uppsala, Jakob Ulvsson was appointed archbishop by the pope in 1469 and ordained in Rome in 1470, after which he returned to Uppsala.

In the conflicts between the Danish king Christian I of Denmark and the Swedish regent Sten Sture, Jakob took a mediating position, trying as far as possible to avoid open warfare, especially in Uppland. After Sten Sture's victory in the Battle at Brunkeberg in 1471, the situation stabilized and he participated in the work of the privy council.

He is usually regarded is the main initiator of the university in Uppsala, which was founded after having received papal approval in the form of a bull of Pope Sixtus IV dated 27 February 1477. Jakob Ulvsson was appointed first chancellor of the university. He resigned from the archbishopric in 1515. He was Archbishop Emeritus of Uppsala until his death at Mariefred Charterhouse in 1521.

== See also ==
- List of archbishops of Uppsala

== Other sources ==
- Gunnar Olsson, "Jakob Ulvsson", Svenskt biografiskt lexikon, Vol. 20, pp. 97–103.
