= Mariefred Charterhouse =

Carthusian monastery in Södermanland, Sweden (1493–1526)

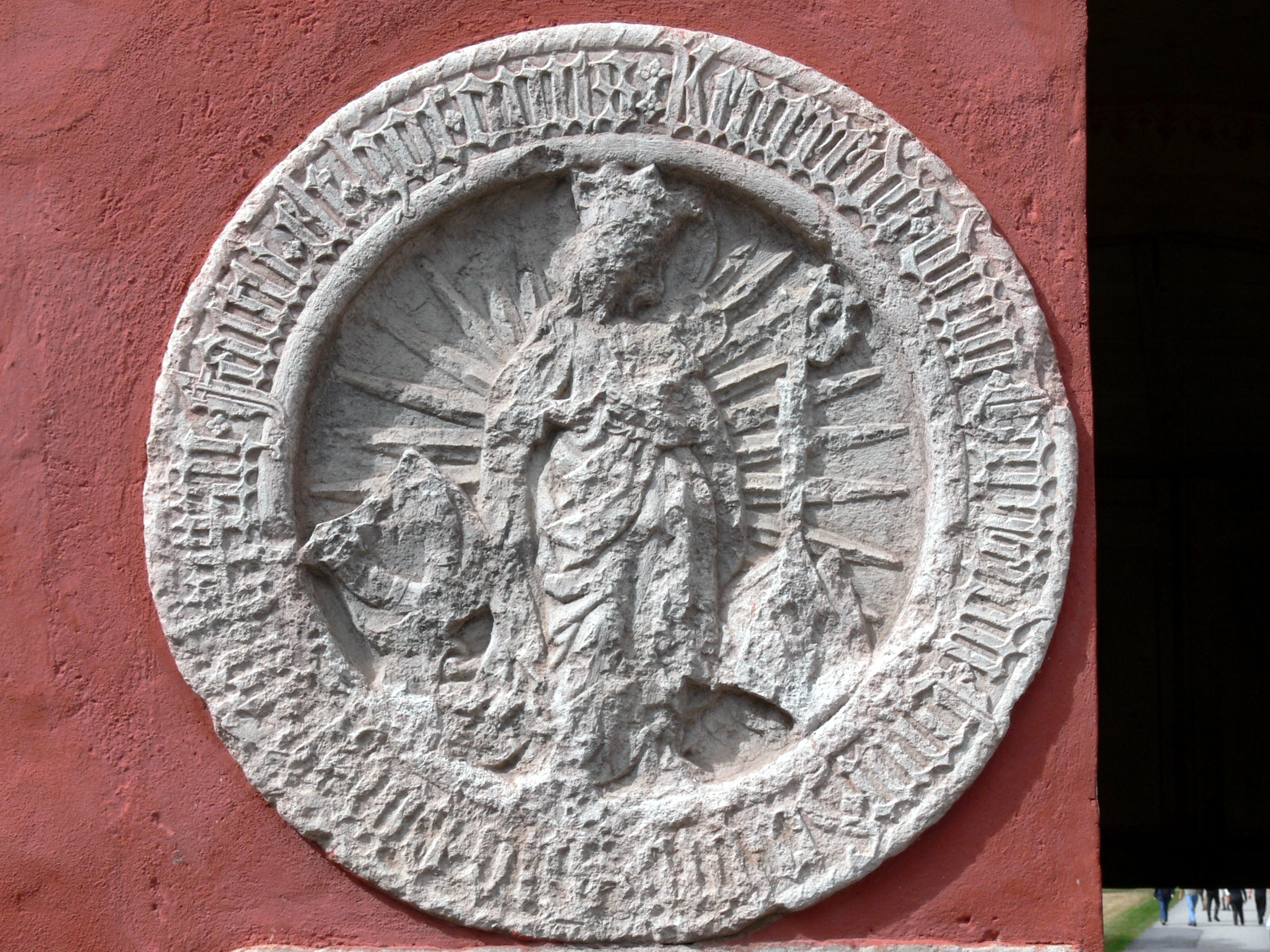
- Arms of Mariefred Charterhouse: carving in Gripsholm Castle

- Location within Södermanland
- Interactive map of Mariefred Charterhouse

Monastery information
- Order: Carthusian
- Established: 1493
- Disestablished: 1526

People
- Founders: Jakob Ulvsson, Archbishop of Uppsala; Kort Rogge, Bishop of Strängnäs

Site
- Location: Mariefred, Södermanland County, Sweden
- Coordinates: 59°15′31″N 17°13′27″E

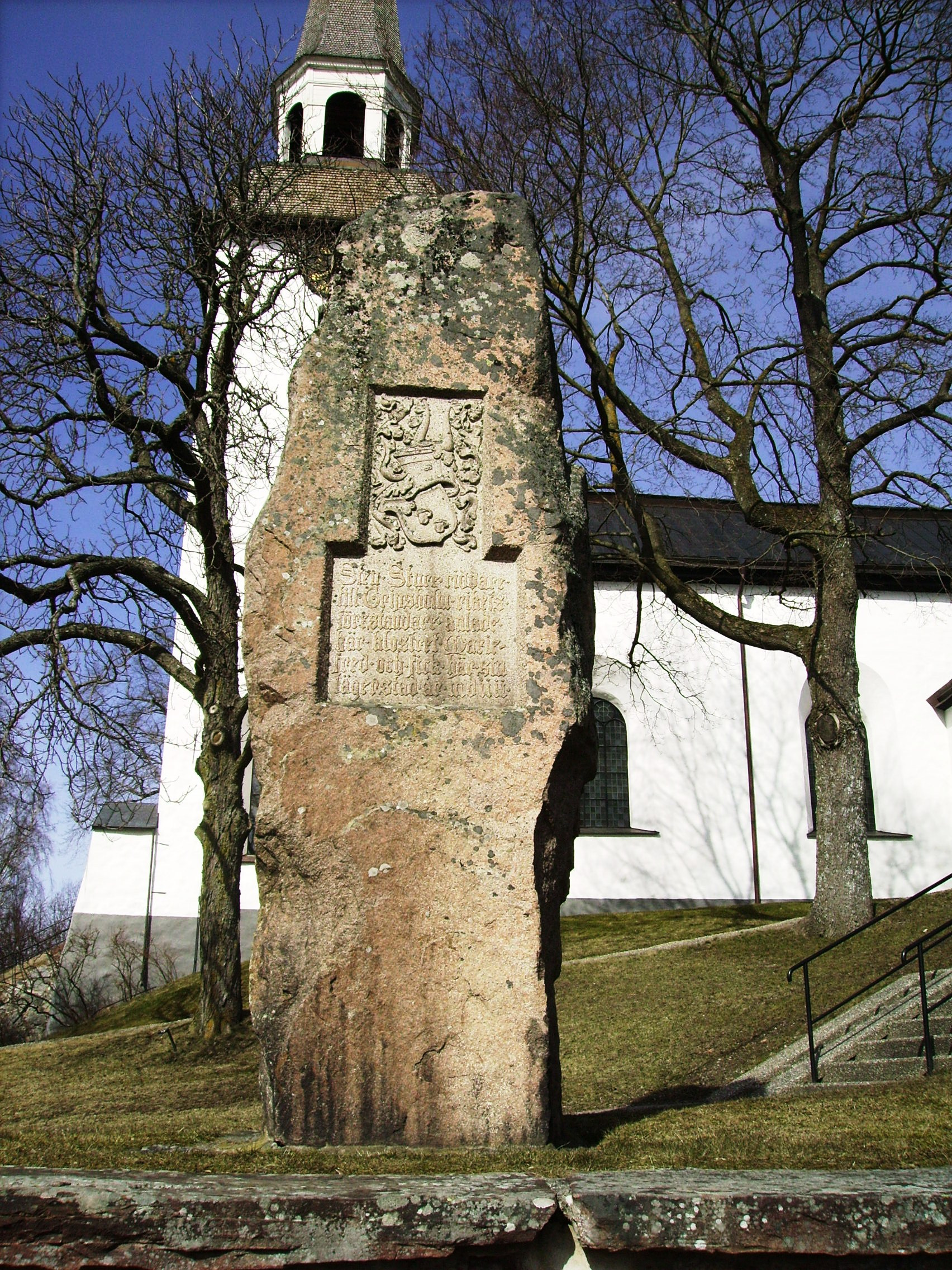
The Sten Sture stone

Mariefred Charterhouse, sometimes referred to as Gripsholm Charterhouse (Swedish: Mariefreds kloster, Latin: Monasterium Pacis Mariae or Pax Mariae), was a Carthusian monastery, or charterhouse, in the present town of Mariefred in Södermanland, Sweden, to which it gave its name; before the building of the monastery the place was known as Gripsholm. It was the only Carthusian monastery in Scandinavia, and one of the last monasteries established in Sweden before the Reformation.

== History ==
The establishment of a Carthusian monastery in Sweden was brought about by the efforts of Jakob Ulvsson, Archbishop of Uppsala, and Kort Rogge, Bishop of Strängnäs, who in 1493 persuaded Sten Sture the elder, Regent of Sweden, to have the monks Fikke Dyssin and Johannes Sanderi together with two lay brothers sent from the Marienehe Charterhouse near Rostock to Sweden for a meeting with the riksrådet (Privy Council of Sweden). Later that year Sten Sture enfeoffed the Carthusians with the Gripsholm estate in Selebo härad in Södermanland and in 1502 gave them other lands round about.

The monastery church was dedicated on 15 February 1504, and Sten Sture was buried here. The monastery was built on the high ground close to Gripsholm Castle on the site where Mariefred Church now stands.

In 1498 the lay brothers set up a printing press. The only book now known from this press is a tract for an ecstatic devotional movement based on the veneration of the rosary, the "Brotherhood of the Psalter of the Virgin Mary". This was distributed across the whole of Europe, and had a powerful effect on the devotional life of late medieval period.

Mariefred Charterhouse was short-lived: in 1526 it was one of the first monasteries secularised by Gustav Vasa. In December 1525 he claimed its assets from the heirs of Sten Sture the Elder, who had given the estate to the monastery on the condition that it should pass to the right heirs of the monastery if it were ever wound up. This claim was legitimated by the Privy Council in January 1526.

Virtually no trace of the monastic buildings now remains above ground: Gustav Vasa had them dismantled for the construction of Gripsholm Castle. A cellar and a few traces of walls have been discovered to the south of the church. A small collection of stones discovered during excavations in the monastery grounds, is in the church tower.

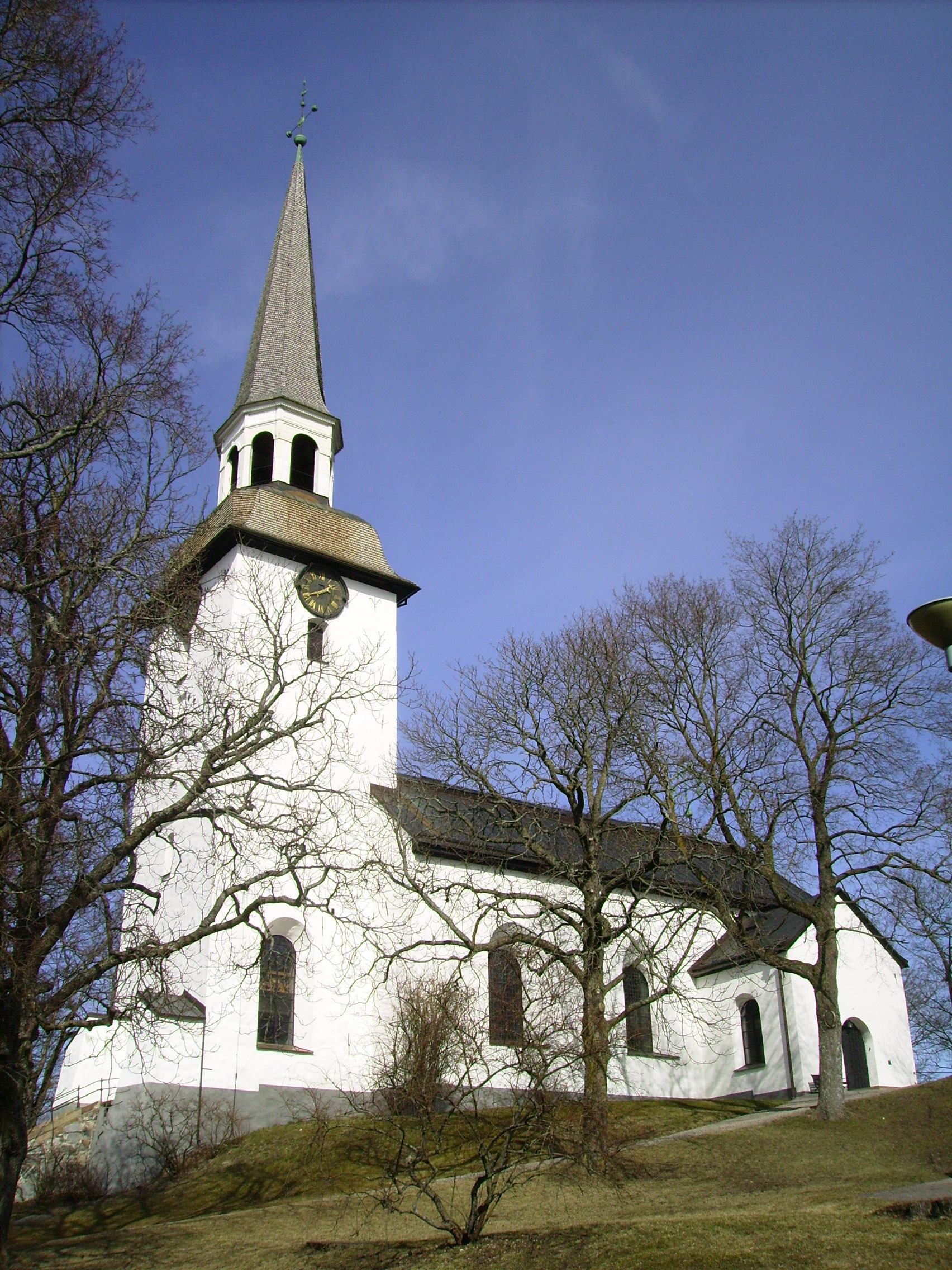
The present parish church of Mariefred, on the site of the former charterhouse

== Mariefred Church ==
Mariefred Church (Mariefreds kyrka) was built in 1621-1624 over the ruins of the old Carthusian monastery. It was built of stone and was burned down in 1682 but rebuilt and completed in 1697. Today it is the parish church of Mariefred and is associated with the Diocese of Strängnäs.

Next to the church stands the Sten Sture stone, erected in 1905, marking the site of the monastery. The inscription reads: "Sten Sture, riddare till Gripsholm, rikets föreståndare, grundade här klostret Mariefred och fick här sin lägerstad år 1504." ("Sten Sture, knight at Gripsholm, regent of the realm, founded here the monastery of Mariefred and received here his resting place in the year 1504").

== Literary reference ==
August Strindberg describes the monks calling in an artist to paint an altarpiece for the newly built monastery in the chapter entitled Utveckling from his collection of short stories entitled Svenska öden och äventyr (Alb. Bonniers. 1913).
