= Nils Jönsson (Oxenstierna) =

Swedish nobleman

Nils Jönsson Oxenstierna

Co-regent of Sweden
- In office January 1448 – June 1448 Serving with Bengt Jönsson Oxenstierna
- Preceded by: Christopher of Bavaria
- Succeeded by: Charles VIII of Sweden

Personal details
- Born: Approximately 1390s
- Died: Approximately 1450s
- Family: Oxenstierna

Nils Jönsson Oxenstierna (1390s–1450s) was a Swedish nobleman. During the Kalmar Union, he was co-regent of Sweden, together with his brother Bengt Jönsson Oxenstierna, from January to June 1448. He was a member of the Privy Council of Sweden in 1432, Castellan (hövitsman) at Borgholm Castle in 1436, Stäket in 1438, and Nyköping Castle in 1442. He was dubbed as a knight by King Christopher of Bavaria following his coronation in 1441.

== Biography ==
Oxenstierna was the son of important nobles and landowners: his mother Märta Finvidsdotter (Frössviksätten) was the heiress of the noble Frössvik family, and his father Jöns Bengtsson Oxenstierna (died 1396–99) was the son and one of the heirs of Ingeborg Nilsdotter (from family that is called the earliest Sparre in later historiography and genealogy), heiress of Ängsö and Salsta. Jöns Bengtsson inherited Frössvik (in Uppland) from his mother and Ängsö (in Västmanland) from his father. His brother, Bengt Jönsson Oxenstierna, was the father of Jöns Bengtsson (Oxenstierna), Archbishop of Uppsala (1417–1467).

In 1418 he acquired an islet and the founded the estate Djursholm. There he built a manor house, later the site of Djursholm Castle (Djursholms slott) which dates from the 15th century but did not get its current appearance until the 17th century.

From his two earlier marriages, Oxenstierna did not succeed to have any surviving male heir. His third wife Katarina Karlsdotter bore a number of children of whom half died without marriage and issue. His surviving son Erik Nilsson Oxenstierna (d. 1470) did not have any children.

Three of Oxenstierna's daughters married noblemen of the Vasa family. Kerstin, who married Nils of Hjulsta, continued a more permanent issue. A portion of Oxenstierna's properties passed ultimately to others than his direct descendants, as inheritances through his daughters-in- and sons-in-law.

== Marriages ==
- Kristina Ivarsdotter
- Kristina Petersdotter
- Katarina Karlsdotter

== See also ==
- Halltorps

Nils Jönsson (Oxenstierna) House of Oxenstierna Born: 1390s Died: 1450s
Regnal titles
Preceded by Christopher of Bavaria as King of Sweden	Co-regent of Sweden; 1448 with Bengt Jönsson (Oxenstierna)	Succeeded by Karl Knutsson as King of Sweden
