= Ekholmen Castle =

Building in eastern Sweden

- Enköping Municipality, Uppsala County, Sweden
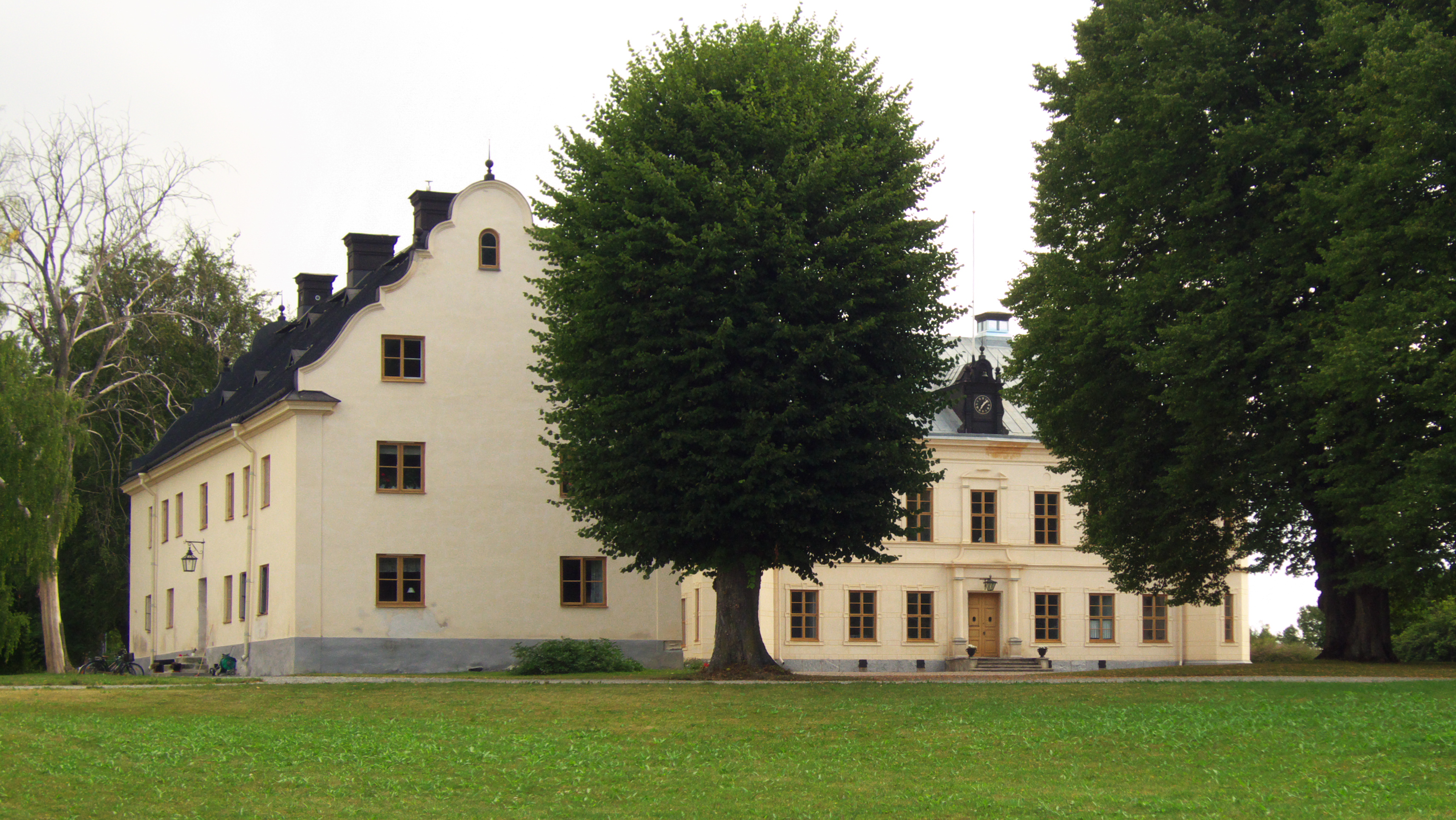

Site information
- Type: Castle

Location
- Coordinates: 59°30′47″N 17°22′27″E

Ekholmen Castle (Swedish: Ekholmens slott) is a castle in Sweden. Ekholmen is located in Veckholm parish, south of Enköping near Norra Björkfjärden in Mälaren. Ekholmen has been known since 1369. The castle building was built in 1736-48 by architect Carl Hårleman. The main building was rebuilt in 1857 to the Renaissance style, four corner towers and the baroque curved gables were added. The restoration in 1857 was led by the architect Fredrik Wilhelm Scholander. The wings are older than the main building and belonged to a house that burned down in 1686, which was built by the heirs of Pontus De la Gardie, who received Ekholmen as a gift from Johan III in 1571. The architect was Jean de la Vallée.

== See also ==
- List of castles in Sweden
