= Nils Jönsson i Rossbol =

Swedish politician

Nils Jönsson i Rossbol (1893–1957) was a Swedish politician. He was a member of the Centre Party.
