= Erik Axelsson Tott =

Dano-Swedish statesman (c. 1419 – 1481)

- Tott family coat of arms

Regent of Sweden
- Reign: 1457 (with Jöns Bengtsson Oxenstierna)
- Predecessor: Charles VIII of Sweden
- Successor: Christian I
- Reign: 1466–1467
- Predecessor: Jöns Bengtsson Oxenstierna
- Successor: Charles VIII of Sweden
- Born: c. 1419
- Died: 1481
- Burial: Aspö Church north of Strängnäs
- Consorts: Bengta Mattsdotter; Elin Gustavsdotter
- House: Tott

Erik Axelsson (Tott) (c. 1419 – 1481) was a Dano-Swedish statesman who served as the regent of Sweden under the Kalmar Union, jointly with Jöns Bengtsson Oxenstierna in 1457 and alone from 1466 to 1467.

== Biography ==
He was born in Scania during the reign of King Eric of Pomerania, as the son of Axel Pedersen Thott, lord of Herlev and Lilloe, and his second wife Ingeborg Ivarsdotter. He entered the service of his mother's first cousin, King Charles VIII of Sweden (c. 1408–1470), at an early age, when Charles was Lord High Constable and Castellan.

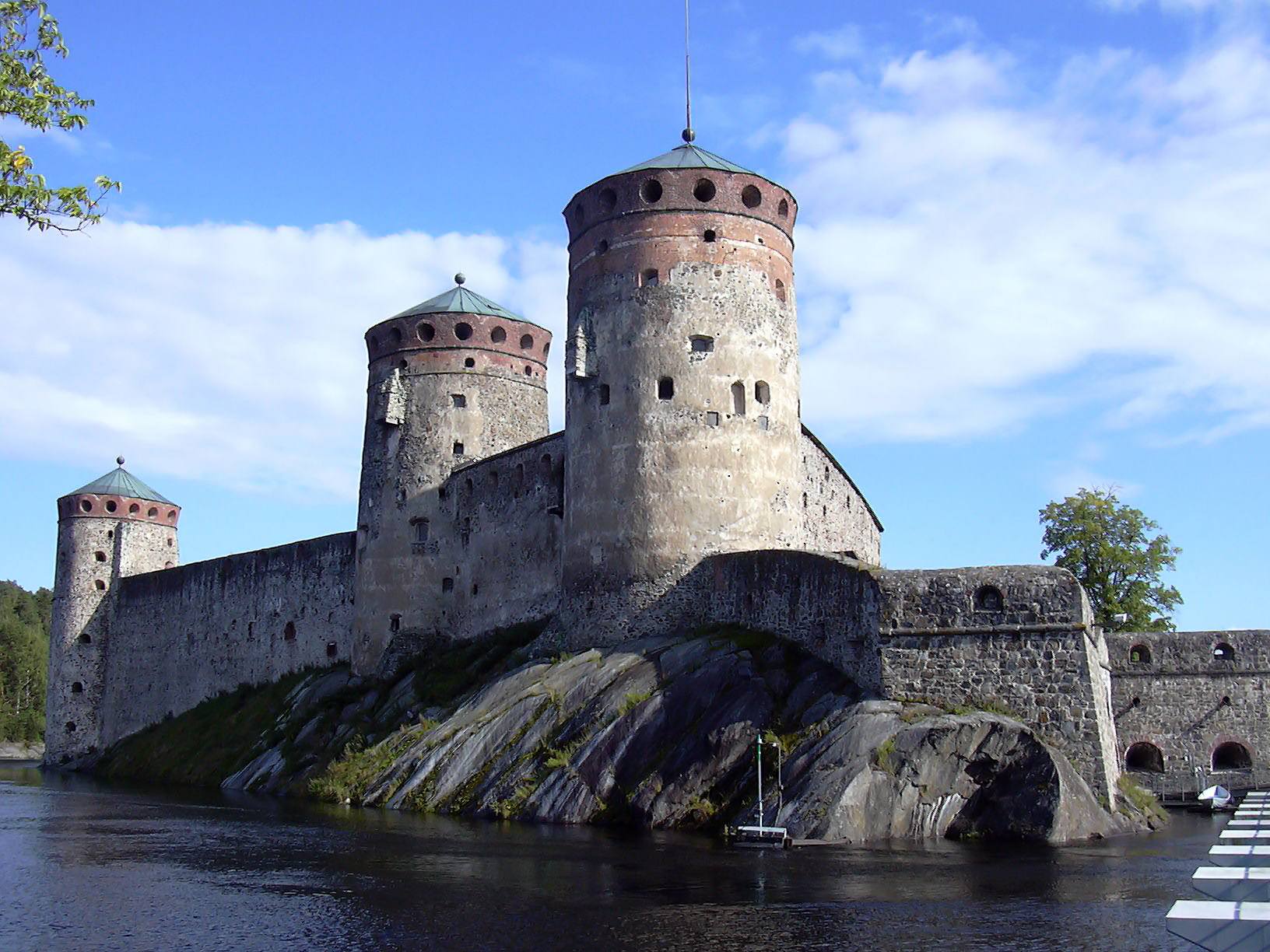
Construction of Olavinlinna Castle in Savonlinna was ordered by Erik Axelsson in the 1470s

Erik Axelsson was the "Swedish anchor" of his family, of whom most regarded themselves as Danish subjects. His father's first wife was from Scania, a region then integral to the (Danish) kingdom. In two generations during the latter half of the 15th century, the nine Tott brothers (Axelssöner), held high and mighty positions just when Denmark and Sweden were struggling to shape the Kalmar Union, however trying to preserve their own family's position and often act in concert. A few of them changed sides in certain occasions, but mostly each of them aligned according to their most important personal landholdings. For longer periods Eric held for the Swedish crown the key Finnish castles and fiefdoms of Viborg, Tavastehus (and built Olofsborg), and was always on the Swedish side, accepting the Danish monarch when Swedish nobility wanted that, and supported separate state/monarchy when the Swedes wanted that. His brother, Iver Axelsen Tott, established a veritable principality for himself by taking the island of Gotland, and sometimes surrounding regions.

Eric opposed his older kinsman the king in 1457, when he as king had gathered much dissatisfaction among Swedish high nobility. In 1467, Eric yet again supported King Charles VIII in his third election. He acquired the former Swedish estates of the Livonian Brothers of the Sword in 1467, including Årsta Castle. As overlord of Finland (Österland), he initiated the construction of the border fortress Olavinlinna in Savonlinna and the Vyborg town wall, both in the 1470s.

Eric Axelsson was married to Bengta Mattsdotter Lillie (d. 1452) and Elin Gustavsdotter Sture (d. 1495) but died childless. His brothers Ivar Tott (d. 1487) and Laurens Axelsson Tott (d. 1483) survived him, inheriting most of his properties, together with his various nephews and nieces.

== Tott's Russian wars ==
Tott's Russian wars refers to two conflicts between Russia and Sweden spanning from the years of 1475–1476, and then 1479–1482. They were both fought over the construction of fortifications at Nyslott.

=== Tott's first Russian war ===
Tott's first Russian war
- Part of the Russo–Swedish Wars
Date	1475–1476
Location	Finland
Result	Inconclusive

Belligerents
Sweden	Russia

Commanders and leaders
Erik Axelsson Tott	Unknown

After the appointment of Erik Axelsson Tott as commander of Viborg in 1457, tensions began to rise with Novgorod. Despite a peace treaty being signed in 1468, the Russians engaged in raids along the border the same year. The situation was worsened by the fact that a truce signed in 1458 would expire in 1473.

In 1475, Tott began the construction of a fortification in Finland called Nyslott or Olofsborg, situated on an islet in the strait between Saimed and Haukivesi though it is unclear whether it was in Swedish or Russian territory. Under these circumstances, the construction led to increased Russian activity in the area. The Swedes had begun requiring a tax for the defense of the east and began equipping troops for this purpose. The commander of these troops was likely the knight Erik Karlsson Vase.

The fighting between the Swedes and Russians was however likely to have only been in smaller patrols, and a peace was eventually signed in 1476.

=== Tott's second Russian war ===
Tott's second Russian war
- Part of the Russo–Swedish Wars
Date	1479–1482
Location	Finland
Result	Inconclusive

Belligerents
Sweden	Russia

Commanders and leaders
Erik Axelsson Tott (1479-1481); Lars Axelsson	Unknown

Strength
24,000	Unknown

Casualties and losses
Unknown	Thousands

The construction of Nyslott continued despite the renewed peace between Russia and Sweden in 1476 and became an issue for the Russians. Erik Axelsson Tott, the commander of Viborg and also responsible for Nyslott, prepares and awaits himself for a large attack by the Russians. Nyslott was at that point extended from having only dirt and wood defenses to stone.

In 1479, the awaited attack occurred, and the Russians launched a raid in the area of Nyslott; however, specific details of the event are not known. In 1480, as revenge for this attack, Tott committed to a revenge attack against the Russians. He had earlier received reinforcements from Sweden and advanced 120 kilometres (75 mi) into Russian territory. According to Olaus Petris, the incursion was extremely brutal, quoting that the Swedes "killed both people and animals, men and women, young and old, to several thousands".

In 1481, Tott died and was succeeded by his brother Lars Axelsson, who continued the conflict until 1482, when he signed a truce which would remain until 1495.

Erik Axelsson Tott House of Tott Born: c. 1419 Died: 1481
Regnal titles
Preceded by Karl Knutsson as King of Sweden	Co-regent of Sweden; 1457 with Jöns Bengtsson Oxenstierna	Succeeded by Christian I as King of Sweden
Preceded by Jöns Bengtsson Oxenstierna	Regent of Sweden; 1466–1467	Succeeded by Karl Knutsson as King of Sweden
