= Korsholm Castle =

Ruined medieval fortification in Finland

Coordinates: 63°04′10″N 21°43′16″E

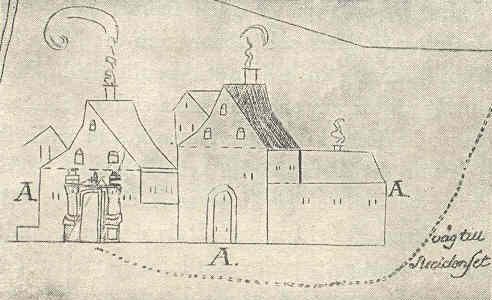

Korsholm Castle (Finnish: Korsholman linna, Swedish: Korsholms slott, also known as Chrysseborg) was a medieval castle in Vaasa, Finland.

Korsholm was probably built in the 1370s. It is possible that the castle was never more than a wooden fortification, surrounded by a moat. By the late 18th century Korsholm was ruined, and new buildings built on the mound had destroyed any medieval remains. Today a low mound is all that remains of the castle.

Korsholm Castle was known to have functioned as one of the bases of the notorious Victual Brothers pirates who terrorized the Baltic Sea region in the Middle Ages. One of the Pirate Chiefs of the Victual Brothers, Otte von Peccatel, apparently ruled the castle until his death.
