= Urban målare =

Swedish painter (fl. 16th century)

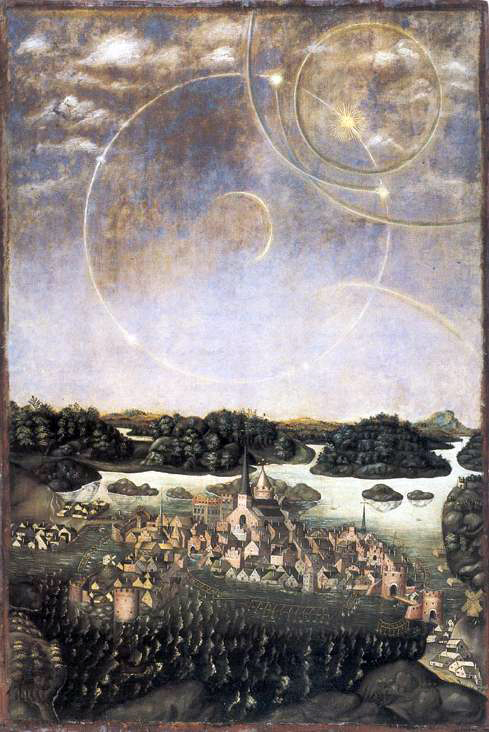
Vädersolstavlan, a 1630s copy of an original painting from 1535 traditionally attributed to Urban målare.

Urban målare (Swedish: "Urban [the] painter," fl. 1526–1538), actual name Urban Larsson, was a painter active in Sweden during the 16th century.

== Biography ==
Virtually nothing is known about the life and work of Urban målare. Traditionally, the original lost version of the painting Vädersolstavlan is attributed to him, which, today, is well known through the 1630s copy displayed in Stockholm Cathedral. The painting depicts a halo or sun dogs that appeared over Stockholm in 1535, and it is often referred to as the oldest topographically correct view of the Swedish capital. As the painting is stylistically associated with the Danube school, it is possible that Urban målare trained as a painter in Germany. The painting Arvstavlan is often attributed to him.

He is known to have worked as an official court painter for King Gustav Vasa from 1526 onwards, and there is documentary evidence that he sold a property in the western part of Stockholm sometime between 1533 and 1538. (Urban Målare uplåter et steenhuus wästantill).

== See also ==
- History of Stockholm

== Literature ==
- Göran Axel-Nilsson, (1941) "Urban målare", Sankt Eriks årsbok 1941, Samfundet S:t Erik, (in Swedish)
