= Natur & Kultur =

Swedish publishing foundation

Natur och Kultur
- Founded: 1922
- Founders: Johan Hansson, Jenny Bergqvist Hansson
- Country of origin: Sweden
- Headquarters location: Stockholm
- Official website: www.nok.se

Natur & Kultur is a Swedish publishing foundation with its head office in Stockholm. It is known for an extensive series of teaching materials, and its logotype is an apple tree.

== Overview ==
The publishing house was founded in 1922 by Johan Hansson and his wife, Jenny Bergqvist Hansson, focusing on educational and didactic literature. During the Second World War, it published anti-Nazi literature. It was transformed into a foundation in 1947.

In the 1980s and 1990s, Natur & Kultur bought several other publishing houses, such as Askild & Kärnekull Förlag AB (later renamed Legenda) and LTs Förlag. In addition to textbooks for different levels of education, Natur & Kultur also publishes literary classics and mainstream literature.
