= Christina Abrahamsdotter =

Queen of Sweden in 1470

Queen consort of Sweden
- Tenure: 1470 – 1470
- Born: 1432; Finland
- Died: 1492 (aged 59–60)
- Spouse: Charles VIII of Sweden
- Issue: Anna Karlsdotter; Karl Karlsson
- Father: Abraham Pedersson

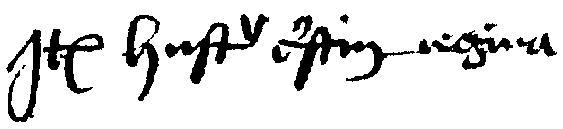
Christina's name as recorded by a member of the Stockholm guild Helga Lekamen, confirming her as queen in 1470

Christina Abrahamsdotter (Swedish: Kristina Abrahamsdotter; Finnish: Kristiina Abrahamintytär; 1432–1492) was a Finnish woman, royal mistress and briefly queen of Sweden as the third wife of King Charles VIII.

== Biography ==
The parentage of Christina Abrahamsdotter is not known, but she is believed to have been the daughter of Abraham Pedersson, governor of Raseborg. The ex-King Charles of Sweden got to know her during his exile in Finland 1457–1464. When Charles returned to Sweden in 1464 and reclaimed the Swedish throne, she followed him there as royal mistress. In 1465, they had a son together.

In 1470, during the last year of his life, Charles married Christina. She thereby became queen, and her son became legitimate. The exact date of the marriage is unknown. Traditionally, the wedding was to have taken place on his deathbed. The marriage took place on an unknown date during the spring of 1470, a few weeks before the death of Charles in May. The wedding is said to have taken place in Stockholm with 50 wedding witnesses.

By the marriage, Christina and her son, also named Karl, were intended to receive legitimacy and inheritance. They were both included in the King's new will, which excluded his sons-in-law, who had been his previous heirs, especially Ivar Axelsson, whom he had previously appointed his successor. The king therefore appointed his nephew Sten Sture the Elder as regent until his son was old enough to be elected King, and also gave him the task to protect their right to inherit him in his new will. The marriage caused controversy because of the difference in rank. Bishop Henrik Tidemansson of Linköping wrote a poem to illustrate the contemporary controversy over the marriage, where he stated that the marriage took place against the royal council and caused a great hatred toward King Charles because he was considered to have made a bad example. Christina was the only royal mistress in Sweden to have become queen alongside Karin Månsdotter (1568).

On 15 May 1470, Christina became a widow and Queen dowager. After the death of Charles, Sten Sture had the king's will revoked, took all of the power himself as regent and gave the majority of the late king's estates to his sons-in-law rather than to his appointed heir. Christina lived a secluded life after the death of Charles. In 1488, her son successfully claimed a part of his inheritance.

== Issue ==
Kristina Abrahamsdotter had two known children with Charles:

- Anna Karlsdotter (Bonde), married to the nobleman Håkan Svensson (Bölja), governor of Västerås castle.
- Karl Karlsson (Bonde) (1465–1488)

== Sources ==
- "Kristina Abrahamsdotter". Archived from the original on September 28, 2007.
- Lars O. Lagerqvist: Sveriges regenter - från forntid till nutid (The regents of Sweden - from then to now)
- Dick Harrison: Karl Knutsson
- Gadd, Pia (Swedish): Frillor, fruar och herrar - en okänd kvinnohistoria (Mistresses, wives and masters - an unknown history of women) Falun 2009

Christina Abrahamsdotter Born: 1432 Died: 1492
Swedish royalty
Vacant Title last held by Dorothea of Brandenburg	Queen consort of Sweden; 1470	Vacant Title next held by Christina of Saxony
