= Karl Knutsson =

King of Sweden and Norway (1408/1409–1470)

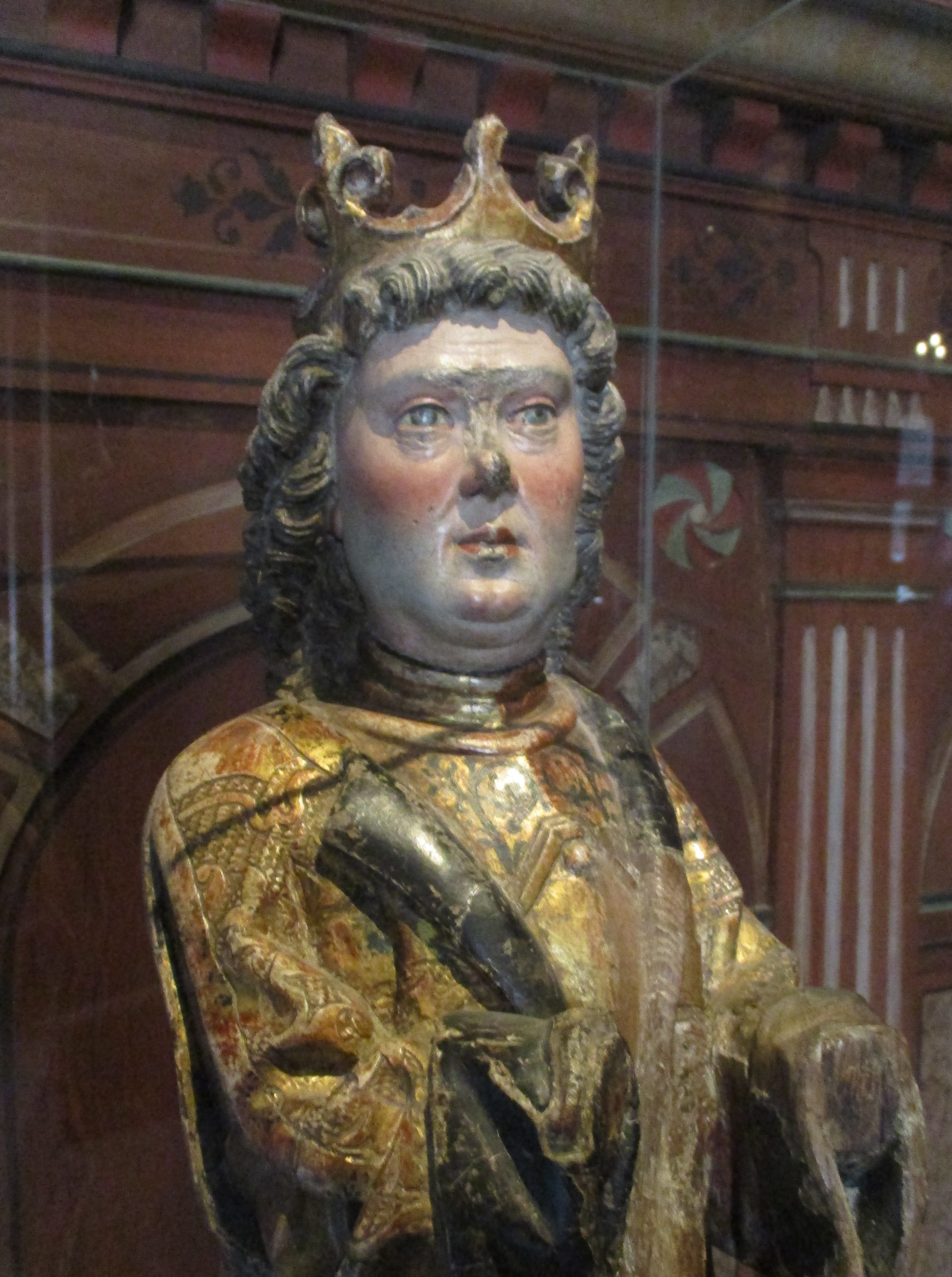
- Wood sculpture of Karl Knutsson by his contemporary Bernt Notke. Made posthumously (c. 1480s), but considered to have real likeness.

King of Sweden
- Reign: 20 June 1448 – 24 February 1457; 9 August 1464 – 30 January 1465; 12 November 1467 – 15 May 1470
- Coronation: 29 June 1448, Uppsala
- Predecessor: Christopher
- Successor: John (1497)

King of Norway
- Reign: 20 November 1449 – 13 May 1450
- Coronation: 20 November 1449, Trondheim
- Predecessor: Christopher
- Successor: Christian I
- Born: c. 1408; Ekholmen Castle, Veckholm, Uppsala
- Died: 15 May 1470 (aged 60); Stockholm Castle
- Burial: Riddarholm Church, Stockholm
- Spouses: Birgitta Turesdotter Bielke; Catherine Karlsdotter Gumsehuvud; Kristina Abrahamsdotter
- Issue among others...: Magdalena
- House: Bonde
- Father: Knut Tordsson Bonde
- Mother: Margareta Karlsdotter Sparre av Tofta

Karl Knutsson Bonde (c. 1408–1470), also known as Charles VIII (Note: Karl Knutsson was the second Swedish king by the name of Karl (sometimes anglicized as Charles). Charles VIII is a posthumous invention, counting backwards from Charles IX (r. 1604–1611) who adopted his numeral according to a fictitious history of Sweden. Six others before Charles VII are unknown to any sources before Johannes Magnus's 16th century book Historia de omnibus gothorum sueonumque regibus, and are considered his invention. Karl Knutsson was the first Swedish monarch of the name to actually use a regnal number as Karl II (later retrospectively renumbered VIII), on his wife's tombstone (1451) at Vadstena.) and called Charles I in Norwegian contexts, was King of Sweden (1448–1457, 1464–1465 and 1467–1470) and King of Norway (1449–1450).

He rose in Swedish politics because Erik of Pomerania was unpopular and became regent after a rebellion by Engelbrekt Engelbrektsson. He held powerful posts, notably in Finland, where he acted semi-independently. After King Christopher's death in 1448, Karl was elected king of Sweden and briefly king of Norway (1449–1450), but was forced to relinquish the latter to Christian I of Denmark. His rule faced opposition from the nobility and church, especially amid war with Denmark from 1451. His consolidation of power alienated key factions like the Oxenstierna and Vasa families, leading to growing resistance that resulted in two rebellions, in 1457 and 1464.

== Early life ==
Karl Knutsson Bonde was born in October 1408 or 1409, at Ekholmen Castle, the son of Knut Tordsson (Bonde), knight and member of the privy council (riksråd), and Margareta Karlsdotter (Sparre av Tofta), the only daughter and heiress of Karl Ulfsson, Lord of Tofta. His father Knut was first cousin of Erik Johansson Vasa's father. His first marriage, in 1428, to Birgitta Turesdotter (Bielke) (died 1436) gave him his daughter Christina. His second marriage, in 1438, to Catherine (Gumsehuvud, died in 1450) produced his second daughter Magdalena, who married Ivar Axelsson (Tott). He also had two children by his third wife (and former mistress) Christina Abrahamsdotter, Anna and Karl. His father was said by contemporary legends to descend from a younger brother of Saint Erik. His mother was an important heiress, descended from Jarl Karl the Deaf and so consequently from some ancient Folkunge earls of Sweden, as well as from Ingegerd Knutsdotter, a daughter of Canute IV of Denmark and Adela of Flanders.

== Growing influence ==
In 1434, Karl became a member of the Privy Council of Sweden and in October of the same year he assumed one of its most senior offices, Lord High Constable of Sweden, or Riksmarsk. Because of the growing dissatisfaction among the Swedish nobility with their king, Erik of Pomerania, Karl was in 1436 made Rikshövitsman, an office equating to Military Governor of the Realm, and finally replaced the king as an elected regent from 1438 to 1440, as the result of the rebellion by Engelbrekt Engelbrektsson. During Karl's brief regentship, the so-called Rebellion of David (a peasant rebellion) took place in Finland. Erik was forced to step down from the throne, and in 1440, Christopher of Bavaria was elected king of Sweden, Norway and Denmark. At the coronation of Christopher in September 1441, Karl was dubbed a knight and appointed Lord High Justiciar of Sweden, or Riksdrots. In October he resigned as Lord High Justiciar and resumed his office as Lord High Constable. From 1442, he was the military governor, hövitsman, at Viborg in Finland (Fief of Viborg).

Karl acquired extensive fiefs, for example in Western Finland. His first seat was in Turku. Soon, Christopher's government began to take back fiefs and positions and he was forced to give up the castle of Turku. Karl's next seat was the castle of Viborg, on Finland's eastern border, where he kept an independent court, taking no heed of Christopher and exercising his own foreign policy in relation to such powers in the region as the Hanseatic League, the Russian city of Novgorod and the Teutonic Knights in what are today Estonia and Latvia.

== King of Sweden and Norway ==
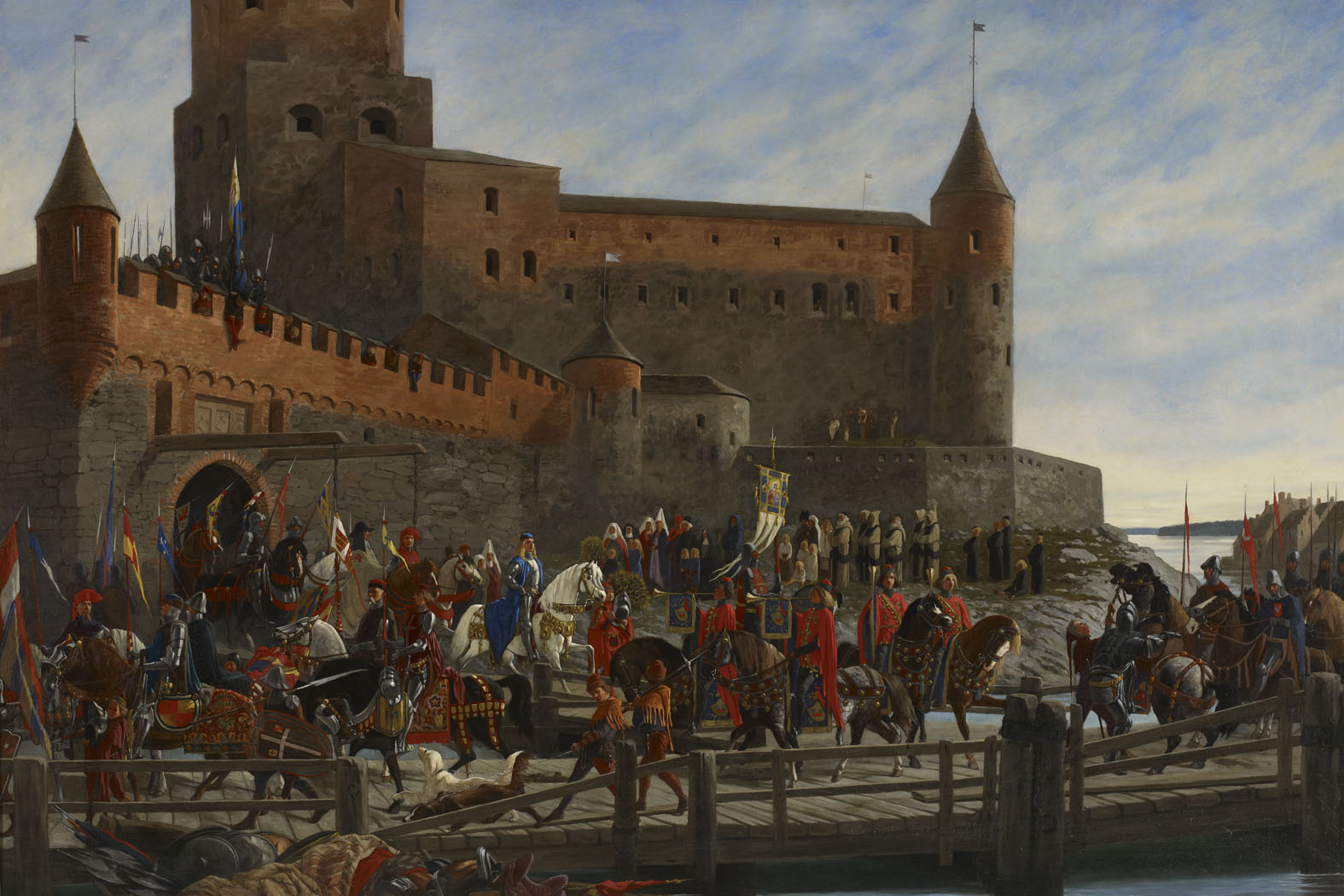
Karl Knutsson leaving Viborg Castle for the election of the new king in 1448, Severin Falkman, 1886

At the death of Christopher in 1448, without a direct heir, Karl was elected king of Sweden on 20 June, and on 28 June, he was hailed as the new monarch at the Stones of Mora, not far from Uppsala, mostly due to his own military troops being present at the place, against the wishes of regents Bengt and Nils Jönsson (Oxenstierna).

Royal coat of arms, created by King Karl in 1448. It has served as template for Sweden's greater coat of arms since.

The Danish had in September 1448 elected Christian I of Denmark as their new monarch. A rivalry ensued between Karl and Christian for the throne of Norway, which had also been ruled by Christopher, with both kings gaining support from various factions in the Norwegian Council of the realm. In 1449, a portion of the Norwegian council elected Karl as king of Norway, and he was crowned in Nidaros Cathedral in Trondheim on 20 November. However, Christian also continued pursuing his claim to Norway. The Swedish aristocracy was reluctant to back Karl in a war against Denmark over Norway, and on 13 May 1450, he was forced to relinquish the throne of Norway in favour of Christian.

From 1451, Sweden and Denmark were in state of war against each other. Because of devastating warring, a growing opposition against Karl emerged among the nobility in Sweden. The strongest opponent was the Swedish church which opposed his efforts to concentrate royal and secular power. Other opponents were the family group of Oxenstierna and the House of Vasa, which had been on the opposing side in the election of king and lost.

== Later reigns ==
During the next 20 years, Karl was deposed twice, only to regain the throne and reign three times (1448–1457, 1464–65, 1467–1470).

In 1457, a rebellion took place, led by Archbishop Jöns Bengtsson (Oxenstierna) and a nobleman, Erik Axelsson Tott. Karl went into exile to Danzig (Gdańsk), Poland and resided in the nearby town of Puck. The two leaders of the revolt took the regentship, and organized the election of Christian I of Denmark as king (firstly in Turku, then in Stockholm).

In 1463, King Christian quarrelled with the Archbishop because of his taxation policies. The Archbishop was imprisoned, which resulted in a rebellion by his relatives, and led to Christian being driven out of Sweden. Karl was recalled by the rebels and returned at the head of a force of German and Polish mercenaries. Upon arrival in Sweden, he found himself at war with the Archbishop, and after a new rebellion in the winter of 1464–1465, he was again exiled. In 1467, the regent Erik Axelsson Tott, now having reverted to support Karl Knutsson, once more had him crowned. He then reigned for three years, sharing power with the Riksråd, until his death in Stockholm in May 1470.

== Family ==
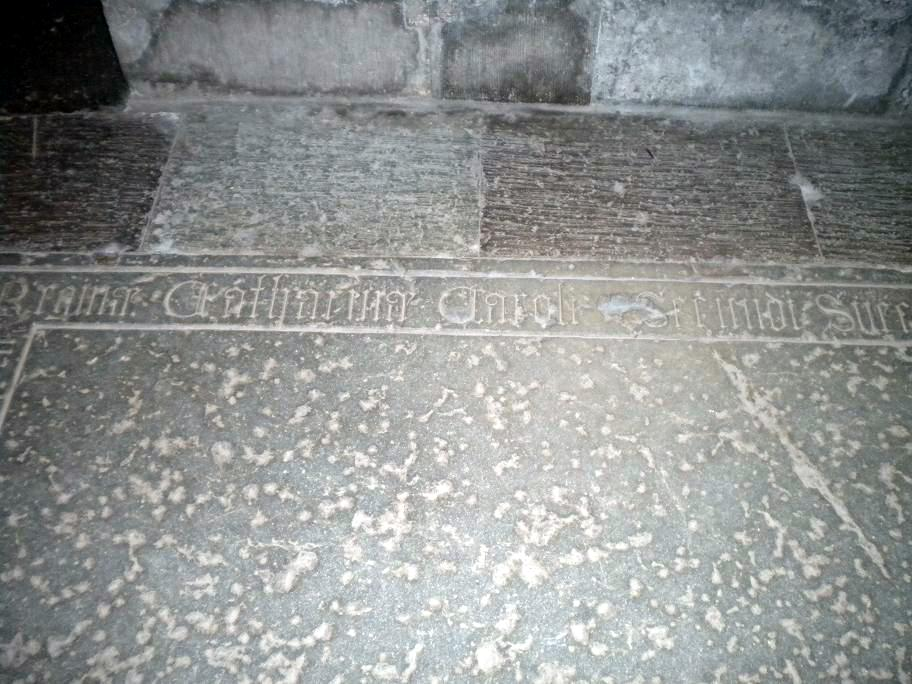
Detail of Queen Catherine's gravestone at Vadstena Abbey, where her husband the king is called Karl II.

With his wife Birgitta Turesdotter (Bielke), Karl had:

- Ture Karlsson (Bonde) (died young before 1447)
- Christina Karlsdotter (Bonde) (c. 1432 – before 1500), married 1446 to the noble, councillor, and courtier Erik Eriksson (Gyllenstierna)

With his wife Catherine, he had:

- Margaret Karlsdotter (Bonde) (1442–1462)
- Magdalena of Sweden (1445–1495), married to noble Ivar Axelsson (Tott) in 1466
- Richeza Karlsdotter (Bonde) (born c. 1445), nun at Vadstena Abbey
- Bridget Karlsdotter (Bonde) (1446–1469), nun at Vadstena Abbey
- four sons died early

With his mistress Christina Abrahamsdotter, he had:

- Anna Karlsdotter (Bonde), married to the noble Håkan Svensson (Bölja), governor of Västerås castle.
- Karl Karlsson (Bonde) (1465–1488)

Karl was survived by only one son, born of Christina Abrahamsdotter, whom he married on his deathbed. Though she was recognized as queen, the Swedish government did not allow the suddenly legitimized boy to succeed him, but appointed one of their number, Sten Sture the Elder (who was Karl's nephew), as regent.

== Legacy ==
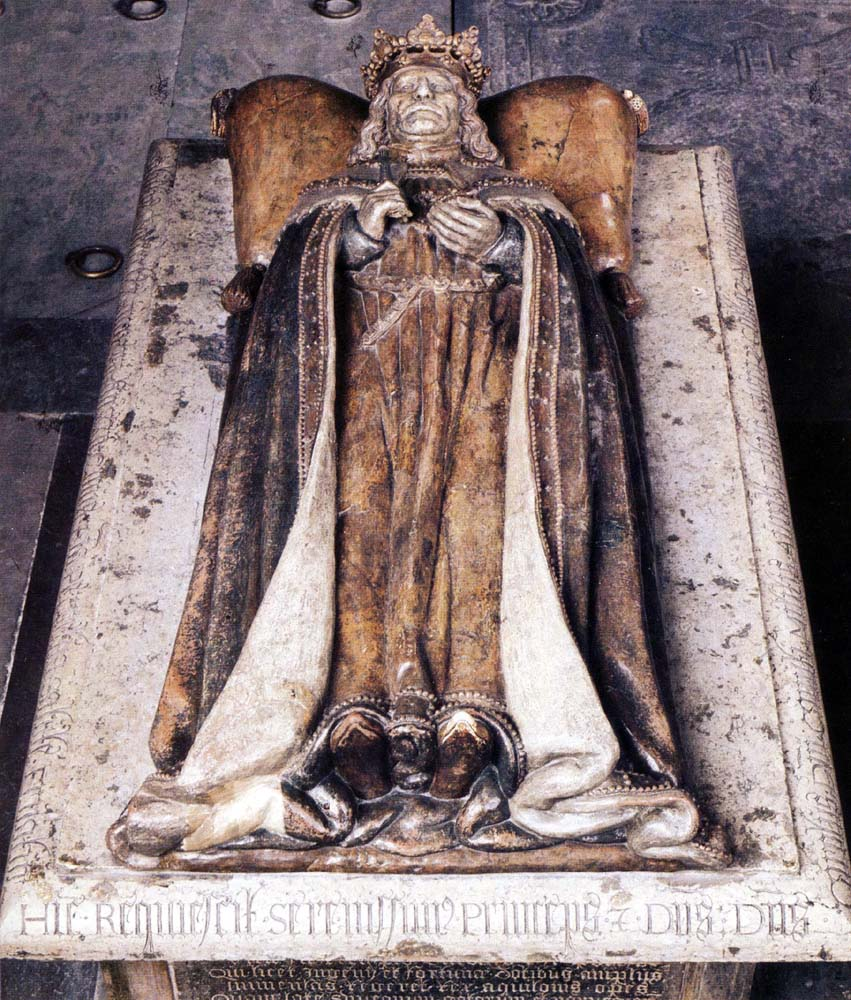
Karl's 16th century grave monument in Riddarholm Church

Karl represented a growing nationalist tendency among the Swedish aristocracy which tried first to subjugate the other Scandinavian countries under Sweden but soon focused on dissolving the Kalmar Union. In the next century, when the union was finally dissolved, he received some respect as an early champion of Swedish independence.

Karl's fight for power and kingship was more successful than his experience thereof. He allegedly recognized this himself and described his life in a brief poem:

When I was Lord of Fågelvik, (pronounced: foegle-veek)

Then I had wealth and might unique.
But once I was King of the Swedish land,

I was a poor and unhappy man.

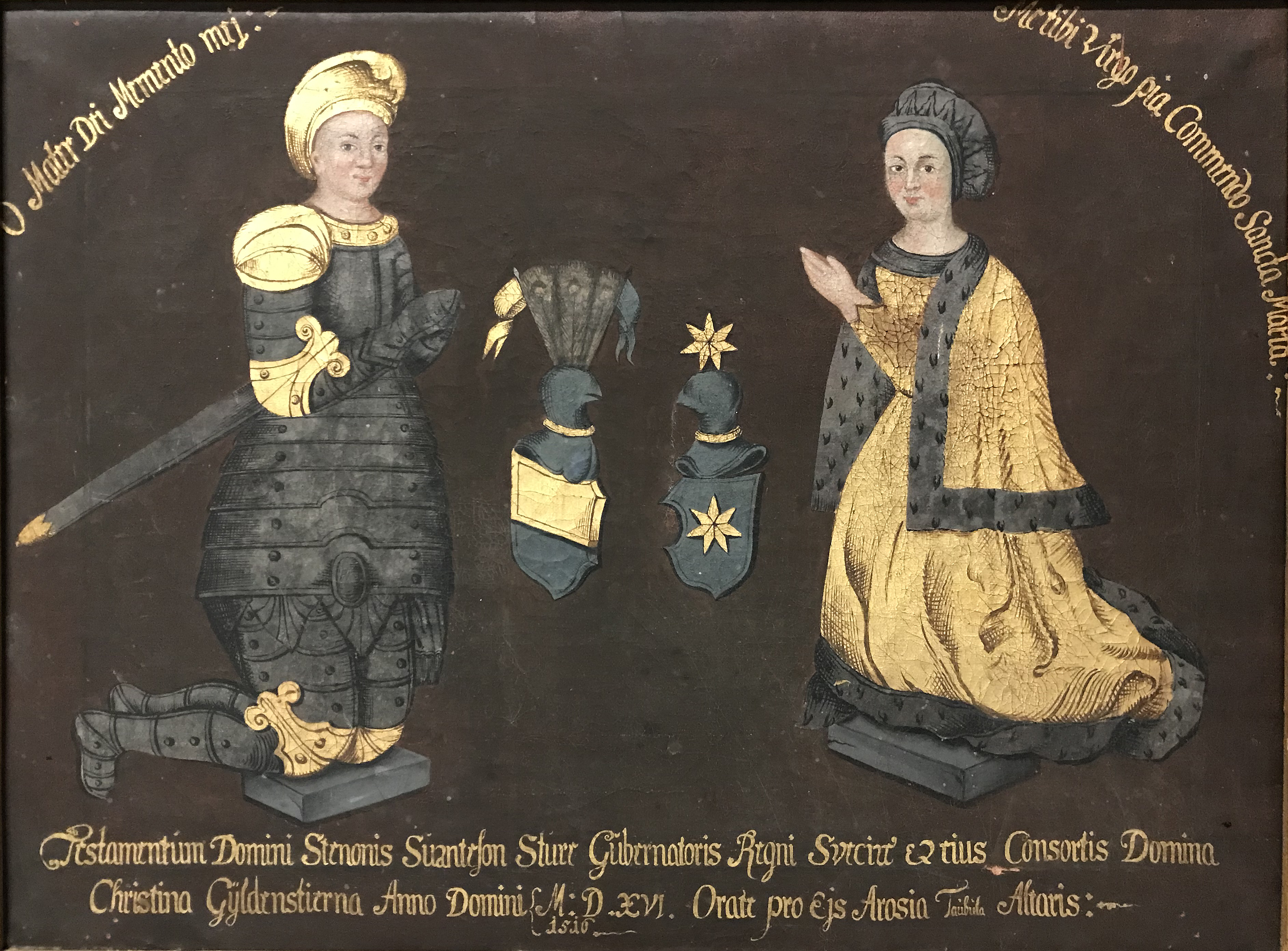
16th century Swedish regent Sten and wife Christina who both operated in strong resistance to Danish rule during the Kalmar Union

Karl's great-granddaughter Christina Nilsdotter Gyllenstierna was married to Sten Sture the Younger whose regentship represented similar values: nationalism and Swedish independence.

Though the Bonde family, not descendants of Karl Knutsson himself but just his collateral relatives, remained prominent among the Swedish nobility and in politics into the 20th Century, Karl's own descendants did not ascend nor inherit any thrones until Prince Christian zu Schleswig-Holstein-Sonderburg-Glucksburg became Christian IX of Denmark in 1863. Karl's descendants have since ascended the thrones of Norway, Greece and Great Britain, Brunswick, Luxembourg, Belgium, Spain, Romania and Russia Empire together with Grand Duchy of Finland. Nicholas II was the first direct descendant on the Finnish throne.

His distant direct descendant, Sibylla of Saxe-Coburg-Gotha, married the Hereditary Prince of Sweden in the 20th century, and with the accession of Sibylla's son, Carl XVI Gustav, Karl Knutsson's blood returned to the Swedish throne.

== Notes ==
Karl Knutsson House of Bonde Born: 5 October 1408 Died: 15 May 1470
Regnal titles
Vacant Title last held by Christopher	King of Norway; 1449–1450	Vacant Title next held by Christian I
Vacant Title last held by Christopher	King of Sweden; 1448–1457	Vacant Title next held by Christian I
Vacant Title last held by Christian I	King of Sweden; 1464–1465	Vacant
Vacant	King of Sweden; 1467–1470	Vacant Title next held by John II
