= Ingeborg Tott =

Queen consort of Sweden (1440s–1507)

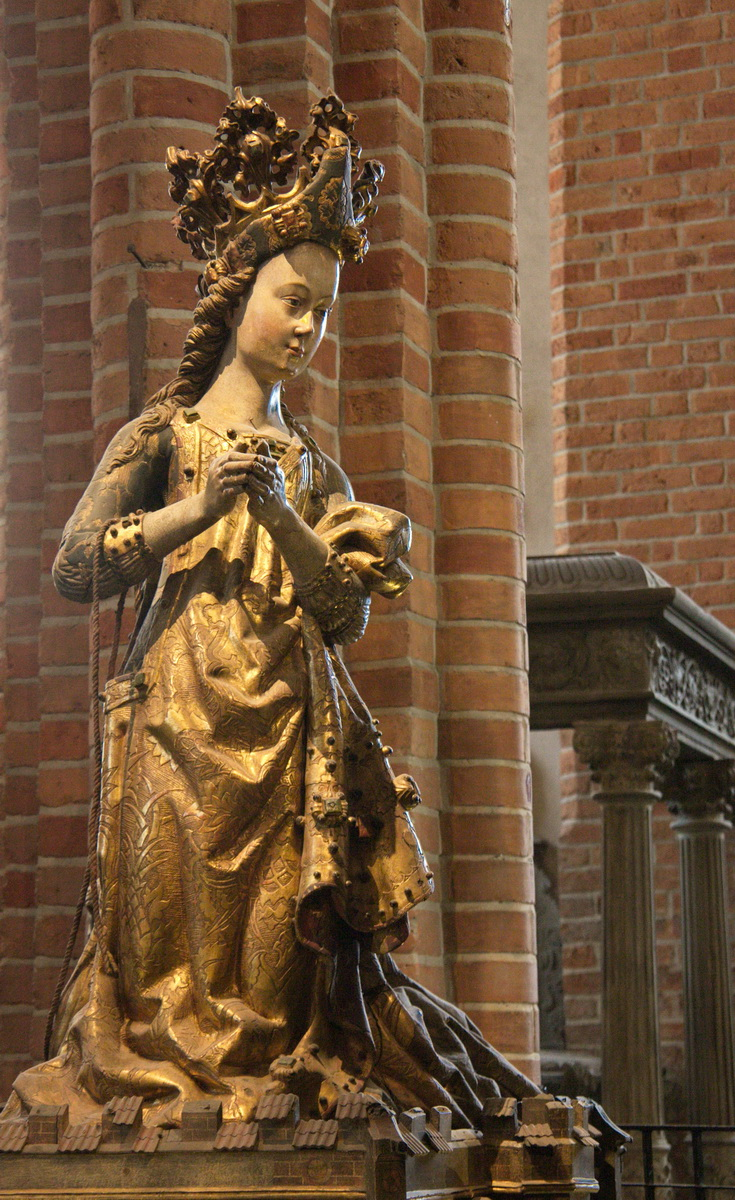
Ingeborg Tott is believed to be the model for the face of the Princess/Maiden of the Saint George and the Dragon by Bernt Notke in Storkyrkan in Stockholm.

Ingeborg Åkesdotter Tott (died December 1507), in her lifetime called Ingeborg Åkesdotter or simply Fru Ingeborg (Lady Ingeborg), was a Swedish noble and the consort of the Swedish regent Sten Sture the Elder (reigned 1470–1497 and 1501–1503). She was the fiefholder of Häme in Finland. She functioned as the de facto queen consort of Sweden for over three decades and participated in state affairs during the reign of her spouse.

== Early life ==
Ingeborg was the daughter of the Danish noble and riksråd Aage Axelsson Tott (1405–1477), governor of Örebro Castle in Sweden, and the Swedish noble Märtha Bengtsdotter of the Vinstorpa family (d. 1480). She belonged to the elite of Dano-Swedish nobility at the time and was related to the infamous Brita Tott.

In 1464, she was engaged to marry the Norwegian noble Hans Sigurdsen, son of the Norwegian drots Sigurd Jonsen, but he died before they were married. In 1467 she married the Swedish noble Sten Sture the Elder. The marriage produced no heirs. Sten Sture was the nephew of King Charles VIII of Sweden through his mother, and the paternal uncle of Ingeborg, Ivar Axelsson Tott, was the son-in-law of Charles VIII by his marriage to Princess Magdalena of Sweden.

== Wife of the regent ==
In 1470, Sten Sture the Elder was elected Regent of Sweden after the death of his uncle Charles VIII. While Sten became king in all but name, Ingeborg was equally given the position of queen in all but name as the first lady in rank in the Swedish court. The court of Sten and Ingeborg was described as a jolly one.

In 1476, she was granted equal inheritance as her brothers after their parents.

=== Political influence ===
Ingeborg has been described as a wise, brave and intellectually capable character, and the equal match of her spouse. The marriage was described as happy. In the correspondence between regent Sten and Ingeborg, the regent referred to her as Min kära hjärtans stallbroder ("my heart's dearest friend and comrade"), and she was entrusted by him with participation in state affairs. Ingeborg became known for her loyalty toward Sten and Sweden despite her birth country being Denmark. In the absence of Sten, Ingeborg, according to the chronicles, ruled wisely over fortresses and counties. Her political involvement is apparent from her correspondence with Sten. In 1503, for example, a letter is preserved with the message that he had received her report, that a meeting between the Hanseatic League and the Danish monarch was to take place, information she had extracted from a ship from Lübeck, and he gave her the task to find out when and where this meeting was to take place.

During the Battle of Brunkeberg in 1471, Ingeborg called the poor of Stockholm to the Royal Castle of Tre Kronor, where she distributed food among them in exchange for their prayers of victory for the Swedes over the Danes, after which she and her ladies-in-waiting watched the battle from the castle wall, praying for victory.

In 1483, during the absence of the Regent on Gotland, a riot took place in Stockholm, when the noble Sten Kristiansson Oxentstierna murdered a commoner and the public tried to lynch him as retaliation. On this occasion, Ingeborg ventured out upon the street in an attempt to calm the situation, but she fell to the ground and was almost trampled to death in the crowd. Upon the return of the Regent, he became so agitated by the incident that he had to be prevented by the council from exacting revenge upon the city. Reportedly, his warning to the city of Stockholm on this occasion kept the peace in the city for the remainder of his reign.

=== Patronage ===
Ingeborg showed an interest in science, theology and education. In 1477, she encouraged the foundation of the first secular university in Sweden, the Uppsala University. She acted as a patron of science and literature, and gave donations to finance libraries and the printing and translations of books. Ingeborg commissioned the De dignitate et utilitate psalteriibeatae Mariae virginis by Alanus de Rupe, which was completed in 1498.

She also took an interest in religion. She acted as patron of the Order of the Carmelites as the benefactor of the Carmelite convent of Varberg, which was founded by her father. In 1493, she acted as the patron of the first convent of the Carthusian Order in Sweden, the Carthusian convent of Mariefred.

=== Interlude and second regency ===
In 1497, the nominal union with Denmark was again made a fact when John, King of Denmark, was elected King of Sweden. Thereby, Sten lost his position of Regent. Sten and Ingeborg left for Finland, where they held a grand court at Häme Castle.

In 1501, King John was deposed as King of Sweden in a rebellion and Sten Sture was again made Regent of Sweden. Stockholm, which was defended against the rebels by the queen of Denmark, Christina of Saxony, surrendered to the Swedish forces after a siege on 9 May 1502. After the surrender, queen Christina turned herself over to lady Ingeborg, who met the queen at the gates of the castle, and escorted her to the Vadstena Abbey, where she was to be kept prisoner. Because of the participation of her spouse in the rebellion against the Danish monarch, the estates of Ingeborg in Denmark, which she had inherited from her parents, were confiscated by the Danish crown.

=== Death of Sten Sture ===
The Regent Sten Sture died in Jönköping 14 December 1503, on his way back home after having escorted queen Christina back to Denmark. Lady Ingeborg was in Stockholm at the time, and initially unaware of his death. His doctor, Hemming Gadh prevented the news of his death from reaching her, and instead informed Svante Sture at Stegeborg Castle, a relative of Sten Sture who was at the time in conflict with Sten because of his ambition of being elected Regent. The purpose was to have Svante Sture elected Regent without any trouble from either the part of the Danish monarch or of Ingeborg and her followers.

There were concerns that Ingeborg, who commanded the strongholds of Sweden and Finland in the name of her spouse, particularly that of Stockholm and Kalmar, would oppose Regent Svante by turning the garrisons of these strongholds against the new regime. It was believed that she could easily do this if she was informed of the death of Sten before the garrisons had been paid, which they were actually due to be at this time: the salary of the garrison of Kalmar Castle was at that time on the way to Kalmar, but when the courier from Ingeborg heard of Sten, he had stopped. Gadh advised Svante to order that the death of Regent Sten should be concealed from Ingeborg until the payment had reached Kalmar, that he should apprehend the courier from Ingeborg, and that, should she herself decide to travel to Kalmar, she should be stopped on her way. The death of Regent Sten was concealed until the very last moment to prevent Ingeborg and her followers from taking any action: the corpse of Sten was hidden during the travel back to Stockholm and a servant similar in his appearance to Sten was dressed to impersonate him until they reached the capital. Lady Ingeborg was thus not informed of the death of her spouse until the party had reached the capital, and was thus incapable of taking any action.

== Later life ==
In January 1504, Svante Sture was elected Regent of Sweden. Ingeborg did turn over the castle strongholds of Sweden and Finland to him, but not until she had them emptied of weapons and supplies of the garrison.

As a widow, Ingeborg was granted Häme Castle in Finland to rule as her fief. In 1505, her right as commandant of the Castle was questioned by the council, who sent her the spouse of her niece, Folke Gregerinpolka, to relieve her of her post as commandant. Ingeborg had the gates closed to him, defied the council and declared that the castle would have two masters. She was supported by the public and some of the nobility, which forced Folke Gregerinpolka to retreat. As commandant of the castle, she commanded the bailiffs and the governors of the area. Ingeborg died in December 1507.

== Legacy ==
The Princess in the group of sculptures Saint George and the Dragon in Storkyrkan in Stockholm, which were made in 1471–1475, is considered to bear the features of Ingeborg.

== See also ==
- Christina Gyllenstierna
- Mette Dyre
