= Dano-Swedish War (1470–1471) =

War between Denmark and Sweden

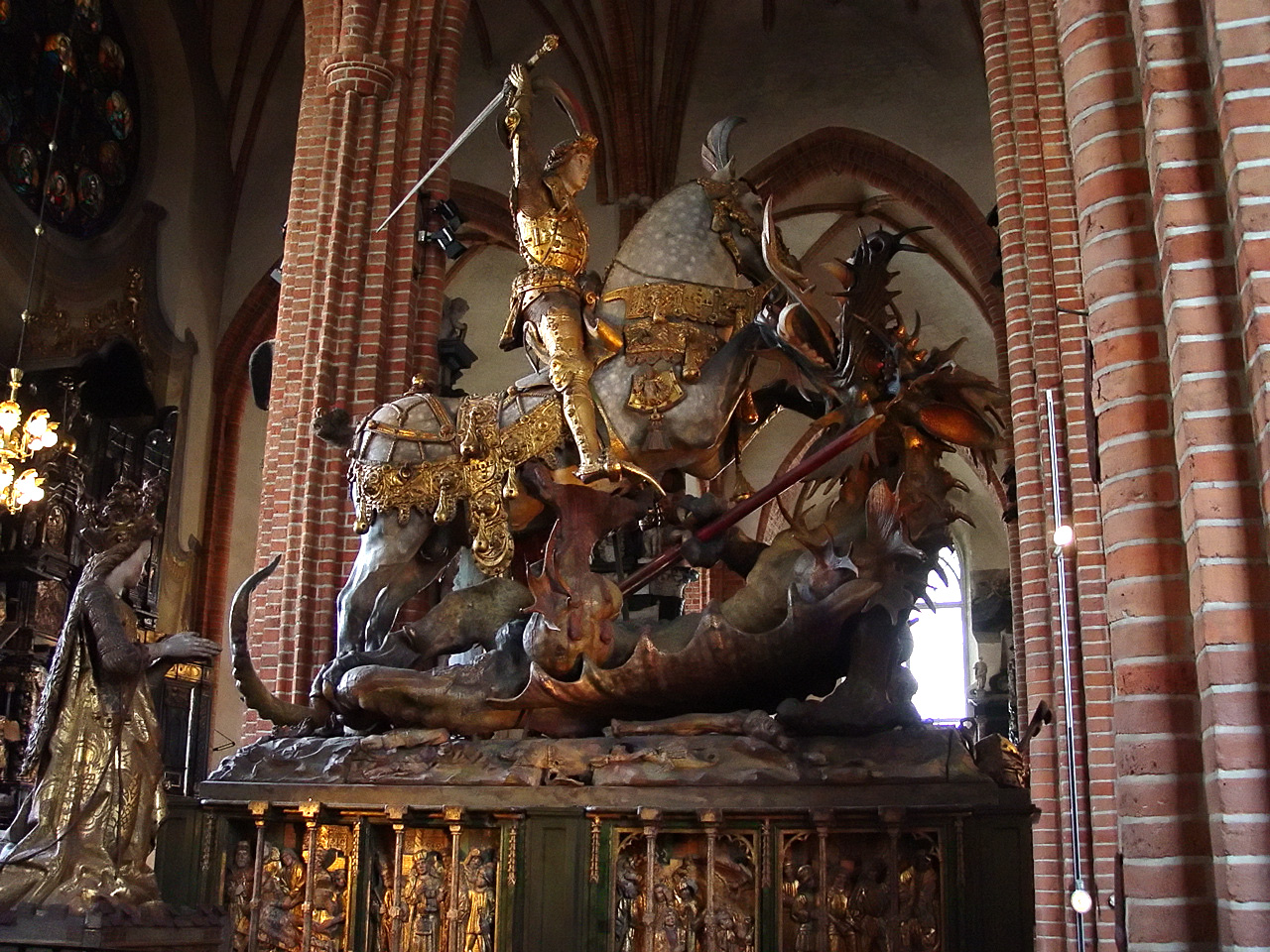
- Saint George and the Dragon by Bernt Notke, in Stockholm's Storkyrkan, commemorating Sture's victory at the Battle of Brunkeberg.
Date	1470–1471
Location	Baltic Sea and Sweden
Result	Swedish victory

Belligerents
Sweden	Kalmar Union

Commanders and leaders
Sten Sture; Nils Sture; Knut Posse	Christian I of Denmark (WIA)

Strength
~10,000 Farmers	3,000 Danish Troops; 2,000 German Knights; 76 ships

Casualties and losses
Unknown, but less than the Danish	4,200 killed, 900 drowned, 900 captured

The Dano-Swedish War was the first conflict between Denmark and Sweden. The Danes invaded Sweden by sea, but were defeated early at the Battle of Brunkeberg, in which King Christian I of Denmark was wounded by a cannonball. The Danish invasion was repelled, and the Swedes were independent from the Kalmar Union.

== Background ==
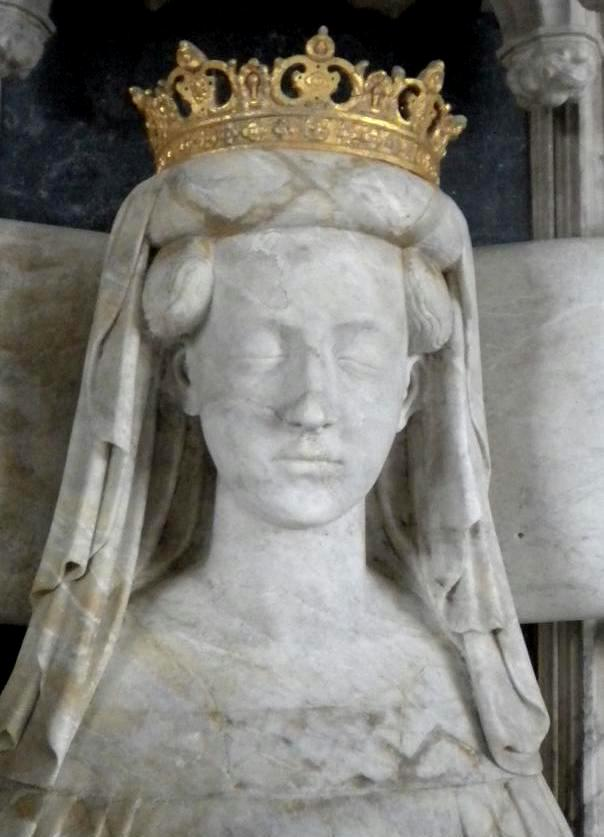
Margaret I of Denmark created the Kalmar Union, a unified Scandinavian Empire under her rule.

Queen Margaret I of Denmark created the Kalmar Union (Denmark, Norway, and Sweden) under her rule with Sweden joining voluntarily. After a few years, however, secessionist movements arose among the Swedish noble's council, led by Karl Knutsson Bonde. Sweden became independent and was then re-occupied by Denmark, only to gain its independence again. When King Karl died, the Swedish council elected Sten Sture the Elder as viceroy. Christian I of Denmark then declared war to re-establish the Kalmar Union.

== Campaign ==
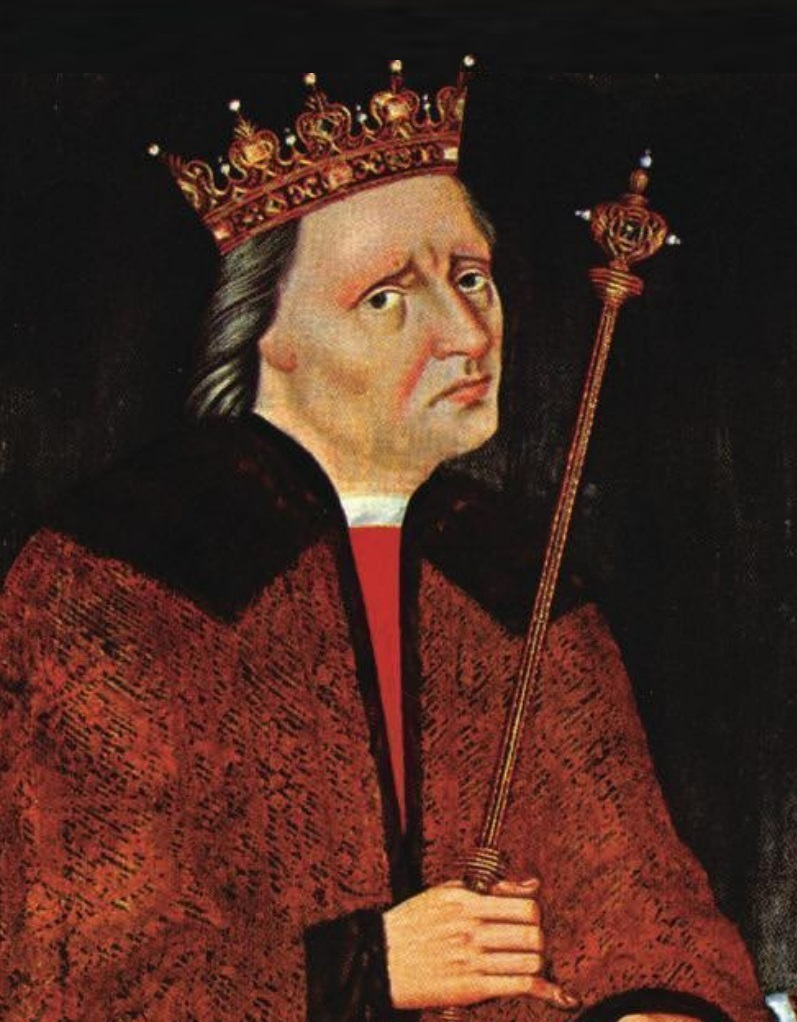
Christian I of Denmark.

King Christian I had 3,000 Danish troops and 2,000 allied Germans. Sture had only about 400 troops in his army, and the Danish could easily pick a fight. In late July 1471, the fleet of 76 Danish ships with the 5,000 troops set out from Copenhagen harbour to land in southern Sweden. Sture and Nils Bosson Sture went to central Sweden to gather as many men as they could for the defense of Stockholm. The Danish fleet would have to face the murderous flow of the archipelago that blocked off Stockholm, but managed, possibly with the help of a hired Swedish pilot, to anchor between Käpplingeholm and Wolf's Island (Vargö) just across the water from Stockholm Castle. Christian decided that a siege would take too long, so he landed in southern Sweden instead. Sten Sture awaited the Danes, now with 10,000 levied peasants.

=== Battle of Brunkeberg ===
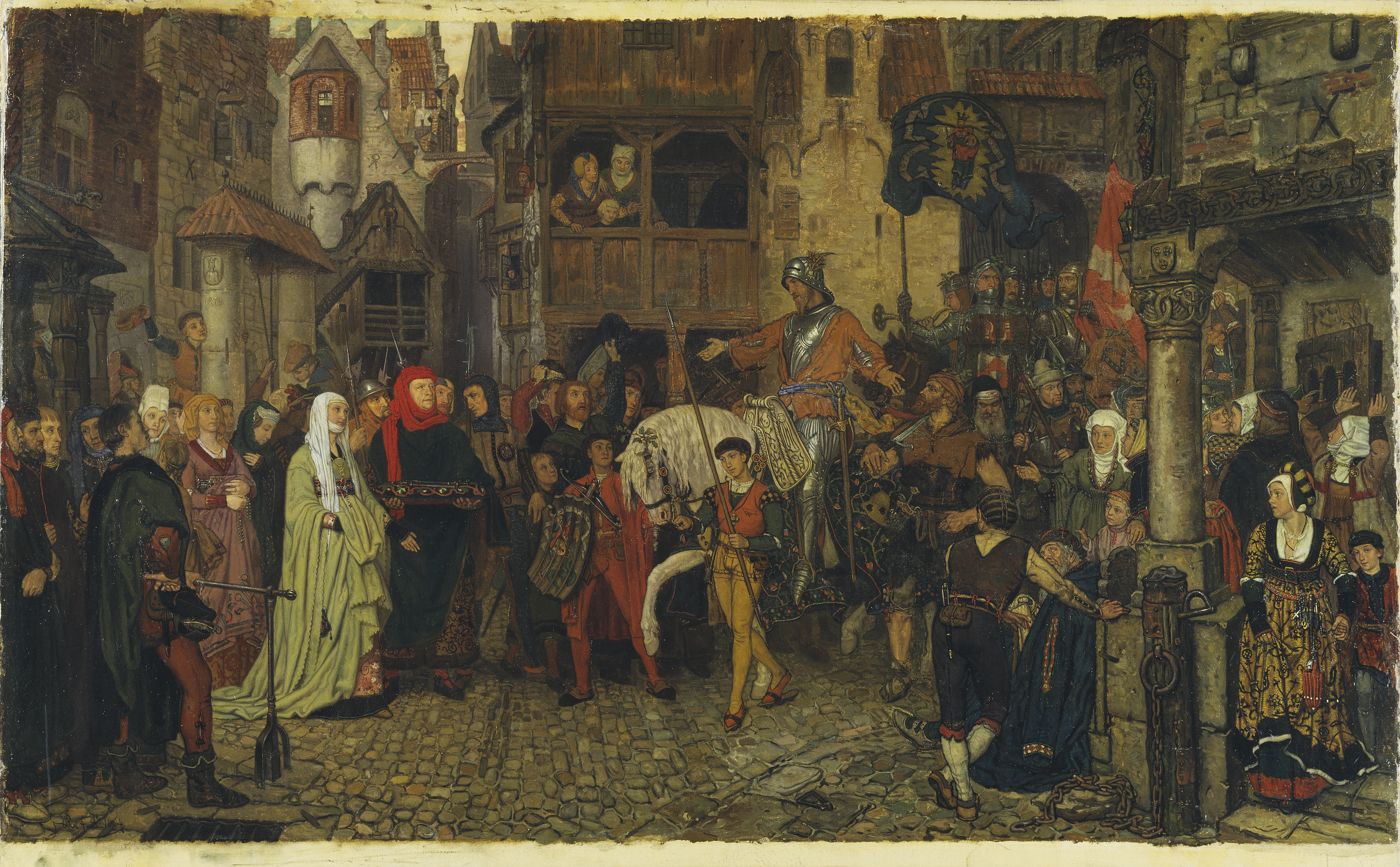
Sture enters Stockholm, victorious; later depiction by Georg von Rosen

On Thursday, October 10, Sten Sture and Nils Bosson Sture lead their troops north to the area which is Hötorget in Stockholm today, near Brunkeberg after which the battle was named. Sten Sture's battle plan was to trap Christian's troops in a vice; Sten would attack from the west, Nils from the east, and Knut Posse would strike out from the city itself.

Nils flanked Christian's Army, and delivered a knockout blow. In Sten's sector, he kept on charging again and again, and managed to break through. In the ensuing battle, Christian was hit in the face by musket fire. Losing several teeth, he was forced to retire from battle. The decisive turn of battle in favor of Sture's side occurred when Nils' troops broke out of the forest north of the ridge, as Posse's troops attacked from the city. This cut off a contingent of Danish troops at the Klara monastery north of the town. However, the Danish were in retreat. Christian retired with his troops towards the island of Käpplingen (today the Blasieholmen peninsula). However, Sten's troops destroyed the makeshift bridge Christian's troops had built, causing many to drown. The battle ended a victory for Sten Sture.

Sture's victory over Christian meant his power as viceroy of Sweden was secure and would remain so for the rest of his life. According to legend, Sture had prayed to Saint George before the battle. He later paid tribute to George by commissioning a statue of Saint George and the Dragon carved by the Lübeck sculptor Bernt Notke for the Storkyrkan church in Stockholm, as an obvious allegory of Sture's battle against Christian. An altar dedicated to George was also built in the church.

According to a 2019 study, "For the victorious Swedes, the battle could be used to confirm a powerful narrative of a long-term, but ultimately successful, struggle against the (Danish) enemies of the realm and the community, most famously represented through the monument of Saint George and the dragon that was erected in 1489."

== Aftermath ==
Now that Christian's invasion was beaten off, Sture had cemented Swedish freedom. He had defeated the Kalmar Union, and Sweden had gained independence. Christian of Oldenburg still held Denmark and Norway (including Iceland and the Faroe Islands) after the war. The two nations that later would be formed were Sweden and Denmark–Norway. Christian died in 1481, and Sture in 1503.
