= Nils Bosson Sture =

Swedish noble

- Born: 1426; Stockholm, Sweden
- Died: 1494 (aged 67–68); Stockholm, Sweden
- Military career
- Allegiance: Sweden
- Branch: Swedish Army
- Service years: 1470–1494
- Rank: General
- Conflicts: War of Deposition against Jöns Bengtsson Oxenstierna; Dano-Swedish War (1470–1471); Battle of Brunkeberg
- Other work: Swedish nobility

Nils Bosson Sture (1426–1494) was a Swedish noble and supporter of Sten Sture to be King of Sweden. He is famous for his flanking movement to surprise King Christian I of Denmark's army at the Battle of Brunkeberg in 1471. He died as a politician in the Swedish government in Stockholm, a proud man. He was the father of Svante Nilsson, who alternately allied and feuded with Sten and was his successor as Regent of Sweden.

== Support of Sture ==
Sten Sture was elected as King Charles VIII of Sweden's successor, which was considered rebellion to Christian I of Denmark's legitimate rulership of Sweden. However, Nils Sture was a supporter of Charles VIII, and respected Sten Sture. Nils Sture was also a relative of Sten Sture as his cousin, and his support for Sten was proven family support. Christian I declared war on Sweden, and mobilized his armies. Nils joined Sten's armies in preparation to defend Sweden.

== Military career ==
Nils Sture traveled to central Sweden to recruit more Peasant Militia and Provincial Knights as Sten was doing. When he had recruited enough men, he joined Knut Posse and Sten near Stockholm. Posse was to attack from Stockholm to the east of the Danish Army. Sten was to launch the juggernaut at the Danish front, and Nils was to attack using a flanking movement. All of the Swedes were in position, and when the time came, the battle unfolded. Nils inched around the Danish Army, but Sten was having trouble. Nils had to hurry to save the Swedish Army. His attack nailed Christian's Army, and the Danish Army was smashed. The three Swedish Generals won against the Danish. Nils moved into politics after the war, and he died in peace.
