= Battle of Öresten =

Battle in Sweden in 1470

- Part of Dano-Swedish War (1469–1470)
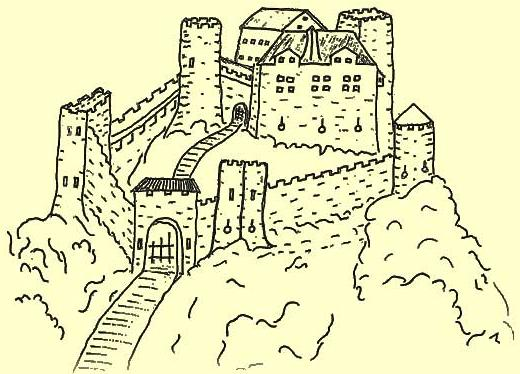
- Depiction of Öresten Fortress by Paul Dolnstein, 1502
Date	Late February 1470
Location	Öresten fortress, Sweden 57°27′51″N 12°37′57″E
Result	Swedish victory
Territorial changes	Danish forces withdraw to Denmark

Belligerents
Sweden	Denmark

Commanders and leaders
Sten Sture the Elder	Christian I (WIA); Peder Oxe; Olof Get; Erik Nipertz †

Strength
Unknown	Unknown

Casualties and losses
10 killed or wounded	100 killed 200 captured

The battle of Öresten (Note: Swedish: Slaget vid Öresten) occurred in late February 1470 during the Dano-Swedish War of 1469 to 1470.

Leading an army, Sten Sture the Elder attacked the Danish one besieging Öresten fortress. The Danes suffered heavy losses, including 100 killed and 200 captured, and Christian I of Denmark was wounded.

== Background ==
In 1469, Christian I of Denmark ended ongoing negotiations with Sweden following an uprising by Erik Karlsson Vasa and invaded Småland, meeting little resistance. In 1470, he invaded Västergötland, sending a force to besiege Öresten fortress. Instead of besieging Öresten, Christian himself continued into Tiveden, but soon withdrew to Öresten following news that Erik Karlsson's uprising had been defeated.

== Battle ==
As the uprising had been defeated, Nils Sture and Sten Sture the Elder were able to face the Danish threat. While Nils marched to Småland, Sten Sture marched toward the Danish army besieging Öresten in late February. Without being detected, Sten Sture's army approached the Danes. According to some sources, he did not take advantage of this and let the Danes prepare. A force led by Peder Oxe and Olof Get was repelled by the Swedes and fled. Despite Christian I himself joining the battle with the main Danish force, the battle ended in a Swedish victory.

== Aftermath ==
The Danes suffered heavy losses. These losses included 100 killed, including Erik Nipertz, and another 200 were captured. Christian I was also wounded. Meanwhile, Swedish losses amounted to ten killed or wounded. Following the battle, The Danes withdrew to Denmark. Dick Harrison opines that the reported casualties were biased.

== See also ==
- Dano-Swedish war (1470-1471)
