= Brita Tott =

Swedish noble and spy (15th century)

Brita Olovsdotter Tott (or Thott) (in Swedish) or Birgitte Olufsdatter Thott (in Danish), (fl. 3 March 1498) was a Danish and Swedish noble, landowner and royal county administrator She was judged for treason and for the forgery of seals. She was one of the biggest landowners in Scandinavia, and her estates played a role in politics in Sweden and Denmark.

== Background ==
Brita was born the eldest daughter of two Danish nobles; statesman Olov Axelsson Tott (d. 1464) and Karen Jensdotter Falk (d. 1429). Her family was one of the most powerful in Scandinavia: her father was politically influential in both Sweden and Denmark, and her mother was the heir of Vallø Castle. She was related to the Swedish regent consort Lady Ingeborg Tott (d. 1507), consort of the Swedish regent Sten Sture the Elder. She was in 1442 married to the Swedish noble councillor Eringisle Nilsson the younger (d. 1469) son of Nils Erengislesson (d. 1442) and Märta Magnusdotter (d. bf 1424). He had inherited the estate of Hammersta at Nynäshamn and the manor Hammerstahus.

== Treason ==
During the war between Sweden and Denmark (1451–52), she corresponded with the enemies of king Charles VIII of Sweden and became involved in a plot against the king. During the war, her spouse was governor of Örebro. When the Danes invaded Västergötland, Brita Olovsdotter corresponded with them and informed them of every movement of the Swedish army which, among other things, enabled the Danish army to capture the fortress of Lödöse and avoid being cast out by the Swedish army. She was charged with having falsified a number of documents. She was put on trial for treason against the crown at the assembled court in Stockholm of 1452. She was judged guilty of high treason and sentenced to be burned at the stake. The sentence was then changed and she spent a period of time at St. John's Priory, Kalmar. After her release, she financed the paintings of Ösmo Church in Södermanland as a penance; one of the paintings there is said to be her own image.

== Landowner and county administrator ==
In 1469, she became a widow and managed the estate herself. The following years was spent on the managing of her large estates and the ownerships over them which, due to their size, was a question debated in the Swedish council. Her stepchildren questioned her right to the Swedish estates of her late spouse, and her stepmother, her father's widow Anne Jensdatter Present (d. 1484), questioned her right to the Danish estates inherited from her mother. In 1475, she gave Hammersta to the church and left Vallø Castle to the Danish crown.

As long as Brita Olofsdotter enjoyed the support of her powerful relatives, she was able to defend her position. She had the support of her powerful uncles, the Tott brothers collectively unknown Axelssönerna. However, Olof Axelsson died in 1464 and Åke Axelsson died in 1477. Erik Axelsson (Tott), who served as regent of Sweden, died in 1481. In 1479, she was put on trial in her absence in Stockholm for forgery and judged guilty of having illegally sold her estate Vallö to the Danish crown. She received mercy and was released. This case caused a change in the law: in 1483, the monarch was banned from receiving noble estates with a specific motivation to the case of 1479.

In 1484, she was appointed county administrator of the royal estate of Dronningholm Slot ved Arresø, a position she managed until 1495. In 1495, she left Denmark for Sweden, where she spent her last years. She was one of the largest landowners in Sweden of her time, and her estates played a part in politics and was the perhaps well known court cases in this area of her time. The dates of her birth and death are both unknown, but she was still alive on 3 March 1498. In her will, she left her estate both to the Swedish regent Sten Sture the Elder and to Uppsala Cathedral, which aroused great confusion.

== See also ==
- Anna Leuhusen
- Magdalena Rudenschöld
