= Saint George and the Dragon (Otto Meyer) =

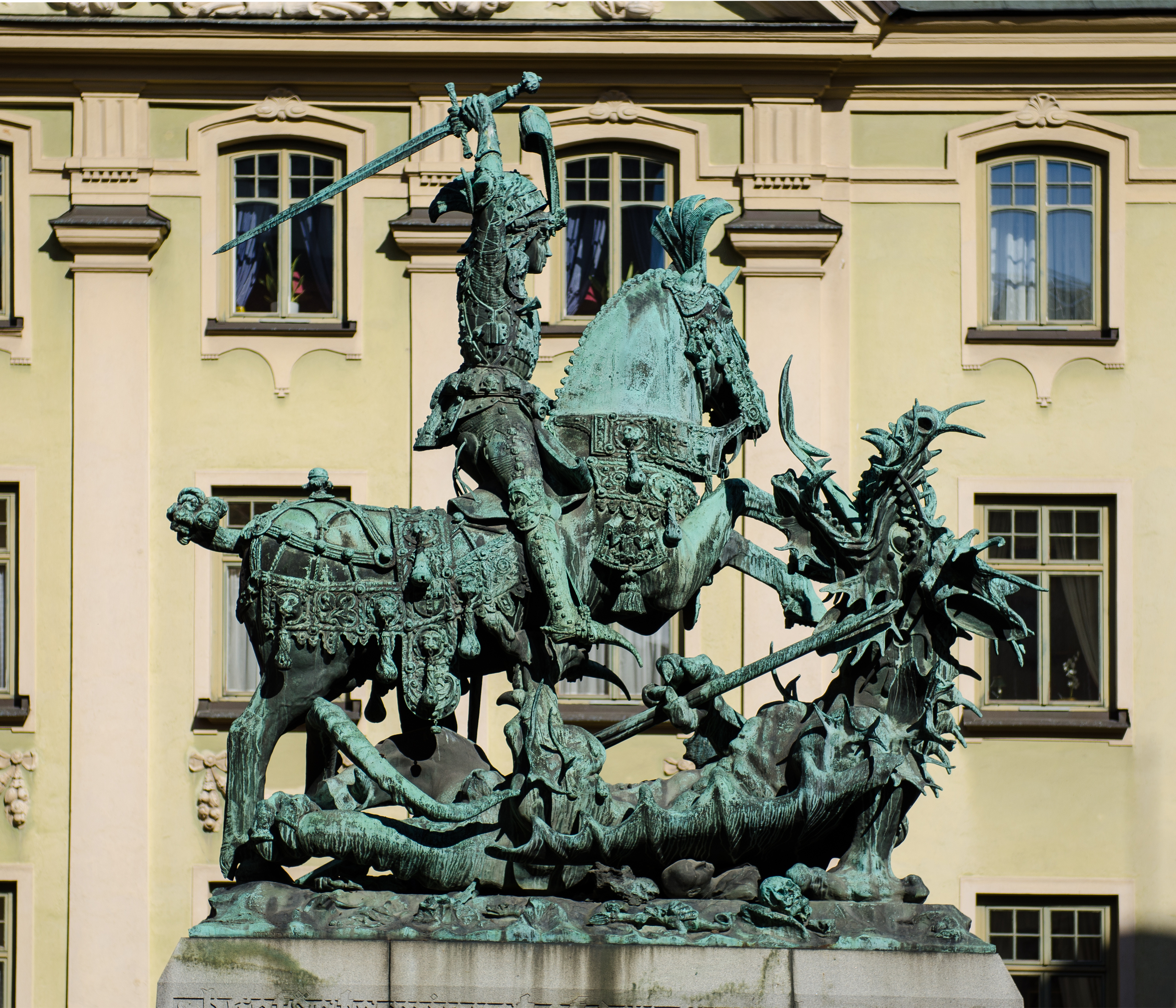
- The sculpture in 2012, its centenary year
- Interactive map of Saint George and the Dragon
- Location: Köpmantorget; Gamla stan Stockholm; Sweden
- Coordinates: 59.32512087°N 18.0737392°E
- Type: Statue
- Material: Bronze
- Opening date: 10 October 1912 (113 years ago)
- Dedicated to: Saint George and the Dragon

The Saint George and the Dragon sculpture is located in Köpmantorget (Merchants' Street) in Gamla stan, Stockholm, Sweden. Unveiled on 10 October 1912, marking the anniversary of the Battle of Brunkeberg, it is a bronze replica of Bernt Notke's wooden Saint George and the Dragon, which is in Stockholm's Storkyrkan. It is dedicated to Saint George, in particular the legend of Saint George and the Dragon.

The sculpture was moulded by Otto Meyer. It depicts the knight, sword raised, about to deliver the final blow to the dragon, which is lying prone on its back having been lanced.

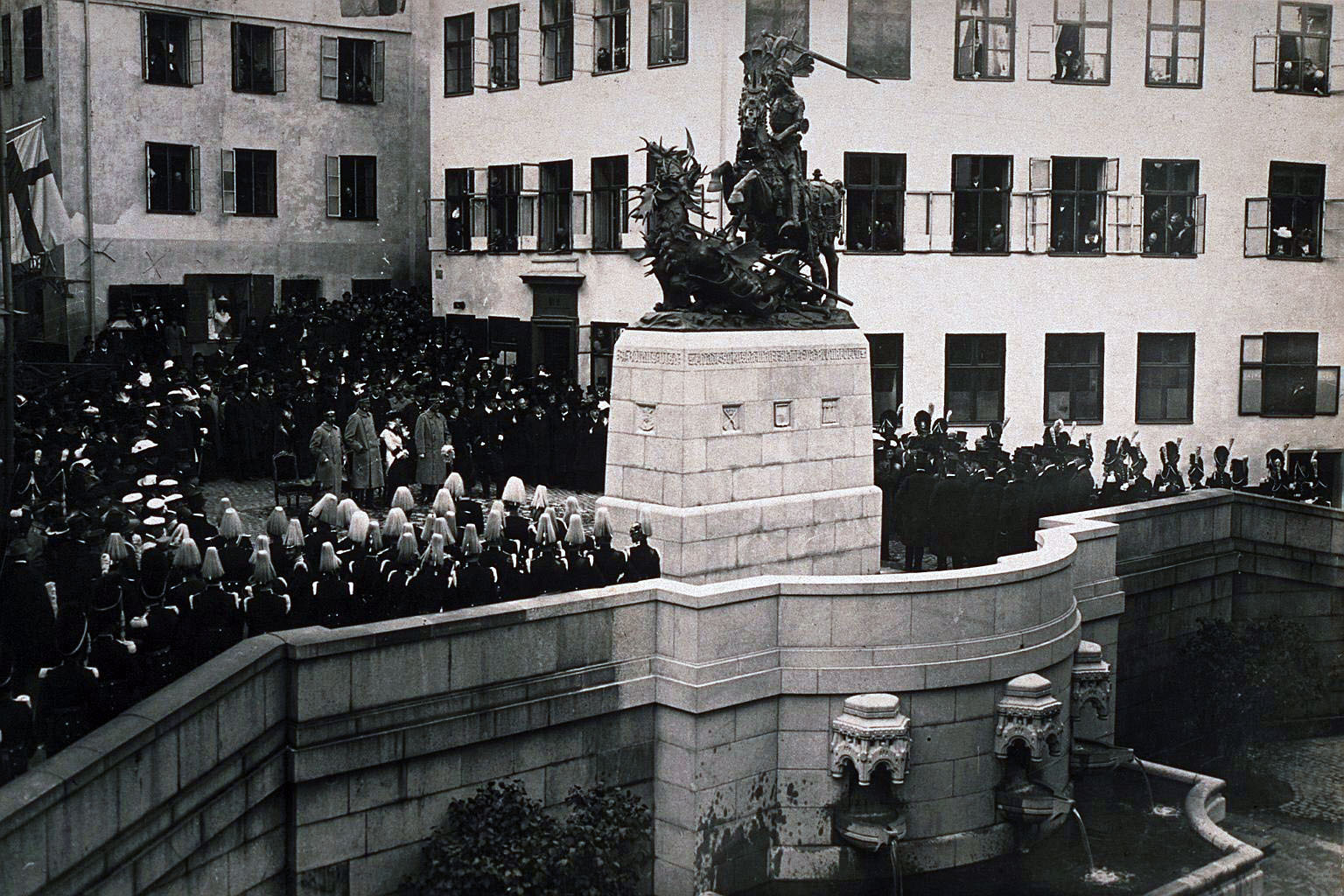
The sculpture's unveiling ceremony, 10 October 1912, looking northwest
