= Henning van der Heide =

German sculptor

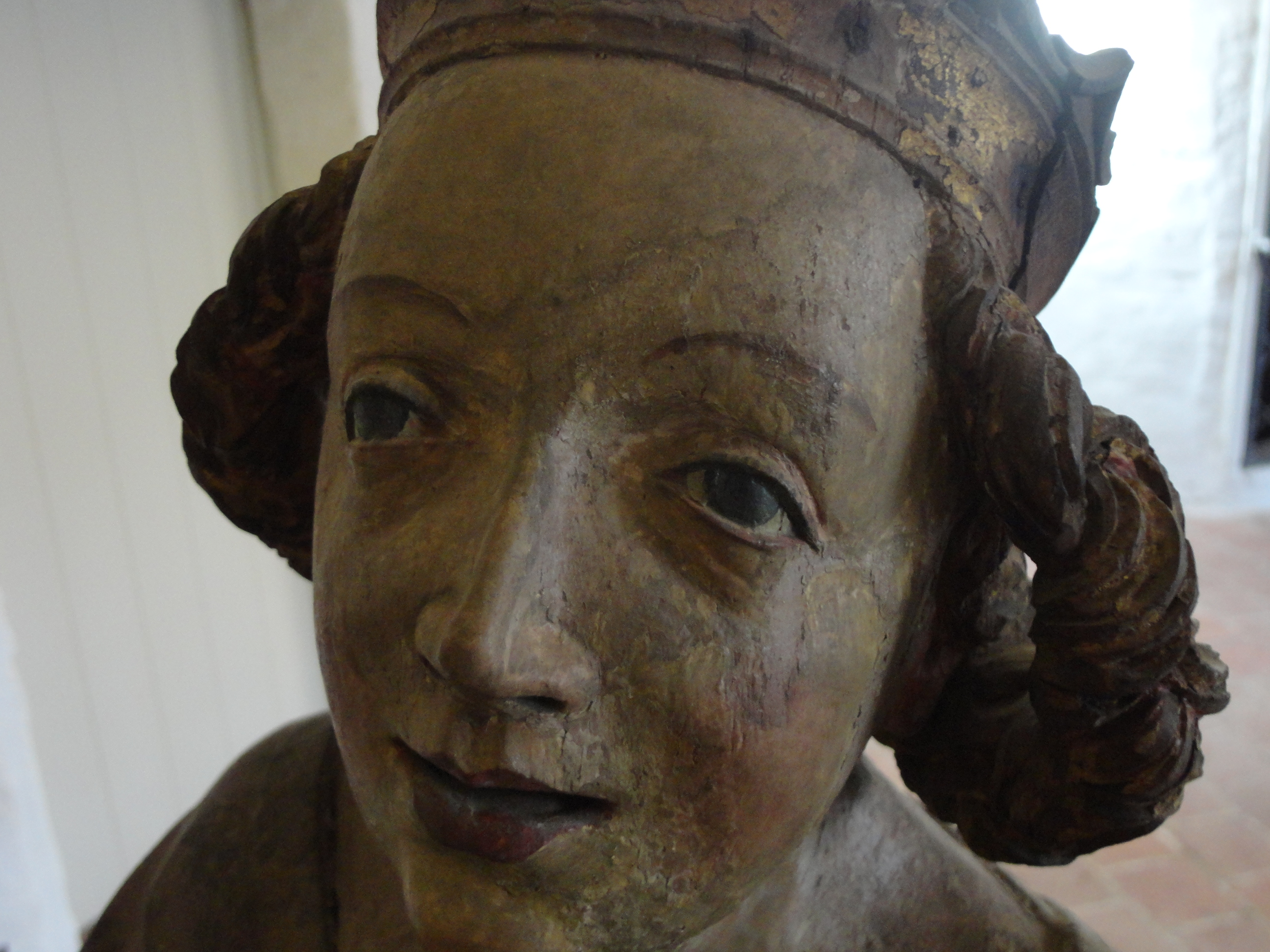
Detail of St. George and the Dragon group by Henning van der Heide in St. Anne's Museum, Lübeck

Henning van der Heide (sometimes von der Heide/Heyde, ca. 1460 - 1521) was a German late Gothic sculptor.

== Life and works ==
Little is known about van der Heide's personal life. He was trained in the workshop of Bernt Notke (and worked with him on his famous Saint George and the Dragon statue in Stockholm) and seems to have lived and worked in Lübeck, present-day Germany. In 1485 he married, and in 1487 he purchased a house in Königstraße street of Lübeck. In 1513 he was made alderman at the guild of painters. He seems to have retired in 1519, when his workshop passed to his oldest son. For a craftsman of his age he appears to have been unusually wealthy as he managed to purchase three houses, one for each of his sons.

His works are often confusingly similar to those of Notke, and scholars debate about what works should be assigned to which artist. As a rule, however, van der Heide seem to have added more individuality to his portraits and less emotionally overstated. Works attributable to van der Heide include altarpieces in Brændekilde church, Denmark and in Saaremaa Museum, Estonia (previously in Kaarma church); the Saint George and the Dragon group currently in the St. Anne's Museum, Lübeck; a sculpture of St. Jerome in Vadstena Abbey, Sweden; a sculpted head of St. John the Baptist currently in the Swedish Museum of National Antiquities, and others.
