= Margareta Gustafsdotter =

Swedish noble

Margareta Gustafsdotter or Margareta Göstafsdotter (floruit 1324), was a Swedish noble landowner and abbess. She founded the convent of the Dominican order for females at Kalmar in 1299 and served as its first abbess.

Margareta Gustafsdotter belonged to the nobility as a member of the noble line Karl Gustavssons ätt, and is mentioned as a major land holder in 1291. In 1299, she donated her land to the first female abbey of the Dominican order in Sweden, which she founded in Kalmar, and became its first abbess. As such, she is last mentioned the 11 April 1324. The Kalmar Nunnery, as it was often called, has been described as a purely aristocratic convent, whose members lived on the allowance from the estates they brought with them as dowry, and functioned until it was dissolved in 1505.
