= St. John's Priory, Kalmar =

St. John's Priory, Kalmar, commonly known simply as Kalmar Nunnery, was a Roman Catholic convent for women of the Dominican Order in Kalmar in Sweden, in operation from 1299 until 1505.

== History ==
The Abbey was founded by the rich landowner Margareta Gustafsdotter, who became its first abbess.

The members of the Abbey predominantly came from wealthy noble families who lived upon the income from their estates, and the life of the abbey was strictly reclusive, the nuns seldom coming in contact with the population of the city.

According to the legend of the chronicle Rimkrönikan, a member of the abbey had a vision foretelling that Charles VIII of Sweden would one day wear a crown. The infamous lady Brita Tott was reportedly imprisoned here for a period of time after having been sentenced for treason.

In 1505, the ongoing conflict between the Swedes and Danes around the city of Kalmar created fears that the Abbey, being strategically placed, would one day be in fear of being used by the Danes in a fight over the town. The members therefore relocated to the Skänninge Abbey, transferring the assets and privileges of the St. John's Priory with them.

The buildings was used by the military, and eventually torn down in 1523-24.

== Legacy ==
An area of the city of Kalmar, Kvarnholmen, originally Systraholmen ('Islet of the Sisters') as well as a river, Systraströmmen ('River of the Sisters'), has been named after the abbey.
