= Sten Sture the Elder =

Regent of Sweden (r. 1470–1497; 1501–1503)

- Riksföreståndare
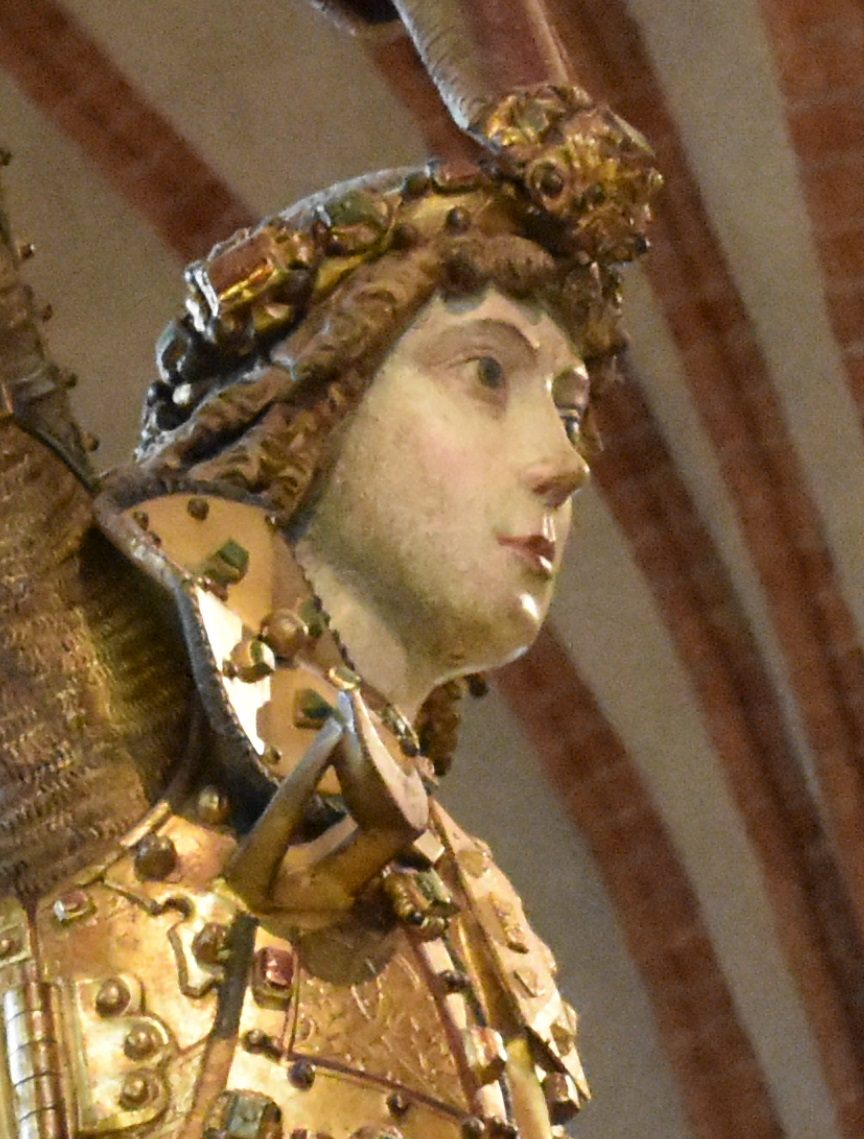
- St. George in Storkyrkan is thought to represent Sten.
- Reign: 1 June 1470 – 6 October 1497; 12 November 1501 – 14 December 1503
- Predecessor: Charles VIII; John
- Successor: John; Svante Nilsson
- Born: 1440
- Died: 14 December 1503 (aged 62–63)
- Burial: Mariefred Charterhouse, later moved to Strängnäs Cathedral
- Spouse: Ingeborg Tott
- Issue: Birgitta (illegitimate)
- House: Sture
- Father: Gustav Anundsson Sture
- Mother: Birgitta Stensdotter Bielke

Sten Sture the Elder (Swedish: Sten Sture den äldre; 1440 – 14 December 1503) was a Swedish statesman and regent of Sweden from 1470 to 1497 and again from 1501 to 1503. As the leader of the victorious Swedish separatist forces against the royal unionist forces led by Danish king Christian I during the Battle of Brunkeberg in 1471, he weakened the Kalmar Union considerably and became the effective ruler of Sweden as Lord Regent for most of his remaining life.

== Background ==
In contemporary sources he is alternatively referred to as Sten Gustavsson or Herr Sten (Lord Sten); the practice of using noble family names as part of a personal name was not yet in use in Sweden at the time. He was born around 1440, the son of Gustav Anundsson of the Sture family and Birgitta Stensdotter Bielke, half-sister of the future Charles VIII. The Sture family was one of the high-ranking noble families of the time, though only distantly related to the royal house; his closest royal ancestor was King Sverker II of Sweden (both through family of Vinga and through family of Aspenäs). Sture's father, Gustav Anundsson, was Castellan of Kalmar Castle and a Privy Councillor, but died when the son was four. Birgitta Stensdotter remarried Gustav Karlsson of the Gumsehuvud family, and the son was most likely raised in their home, first at Kalmar Castle and later at Ekholmen Castle.

The 15th century in Sweden was largely defined by the political struggles and civil wars between the unionists of the Kalmar Union, seeking to unite Sweden with Denmark and Norway under the rule of the Danish monarchs, with Danish support, and the separatists seeking to re-establish Sweden as an independent kingdom under a rival Swedish monarch. Due to his close family ties to the Swedish King Charles, the young Sten Sture became part of the Swedish separatist political movement from an early age, and visited Charles during his exile in Danzig. He is mentioned as a knight in 1462 and as a privy councillor in 1466, and took up residence on the family estate at Räfsnäs north of Mariefred. Sture fought with Bishop and Regent Kettil Karlsson Vasa during the uprising against the Danish King Christian I in 1464, taking part in the decisive victory at Haraker. He served as a military commander under King Charles VIII, defeating Erik Karlsson Vasa's uprising at Uppbo in 1470 and later in the same year successfully beating back Christian I's forces at Öresten.

He married Ingeborg Tott, niece by marriage of Magdalen of Sweden, in 1467; she was a renaissance personality interested in theology and science and seems to have had some importance in the intellectual development during his reign. The marriage was childless.

== First regency ==
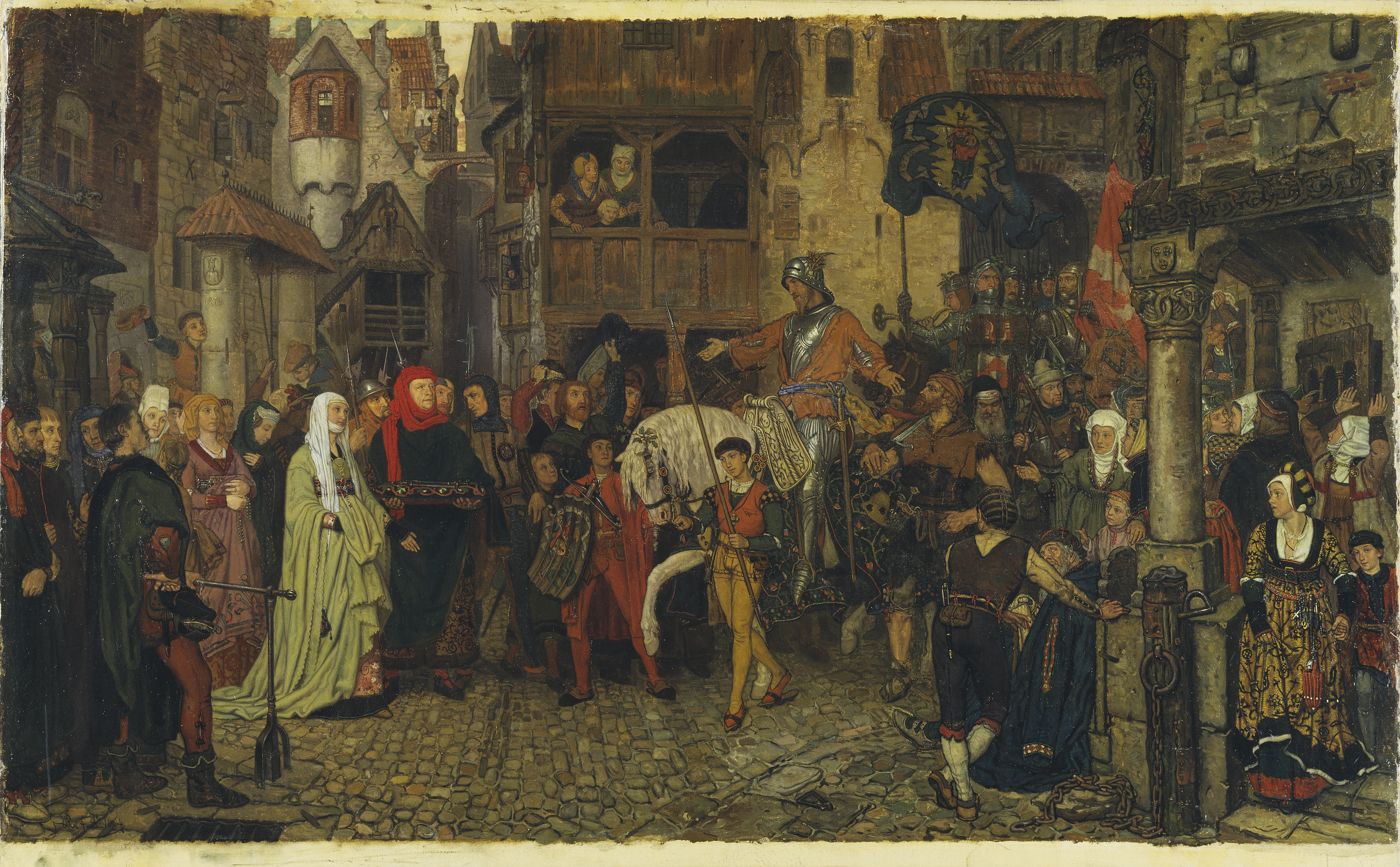
Sten Sture the Elder enters Stockholm. Painting by Georg von Rosen in 1864.

Sture's uncle, King Charles VIII named Sture heir to Charles' personal domains before his death in 1470, and left Sture in charge of the crown lands, including the city of Stockholm and Stockholm Castle. On the death of King Charles on 15 May 1470, Sture immediately became the most powerful noble and political force in the country and was elected Lord Protector and Regent of Sweden (riksföreståndare) by the Riksmöte in Arboga on 1 May 1471. Sture consolidated his position through the victory of Brunkeberg.

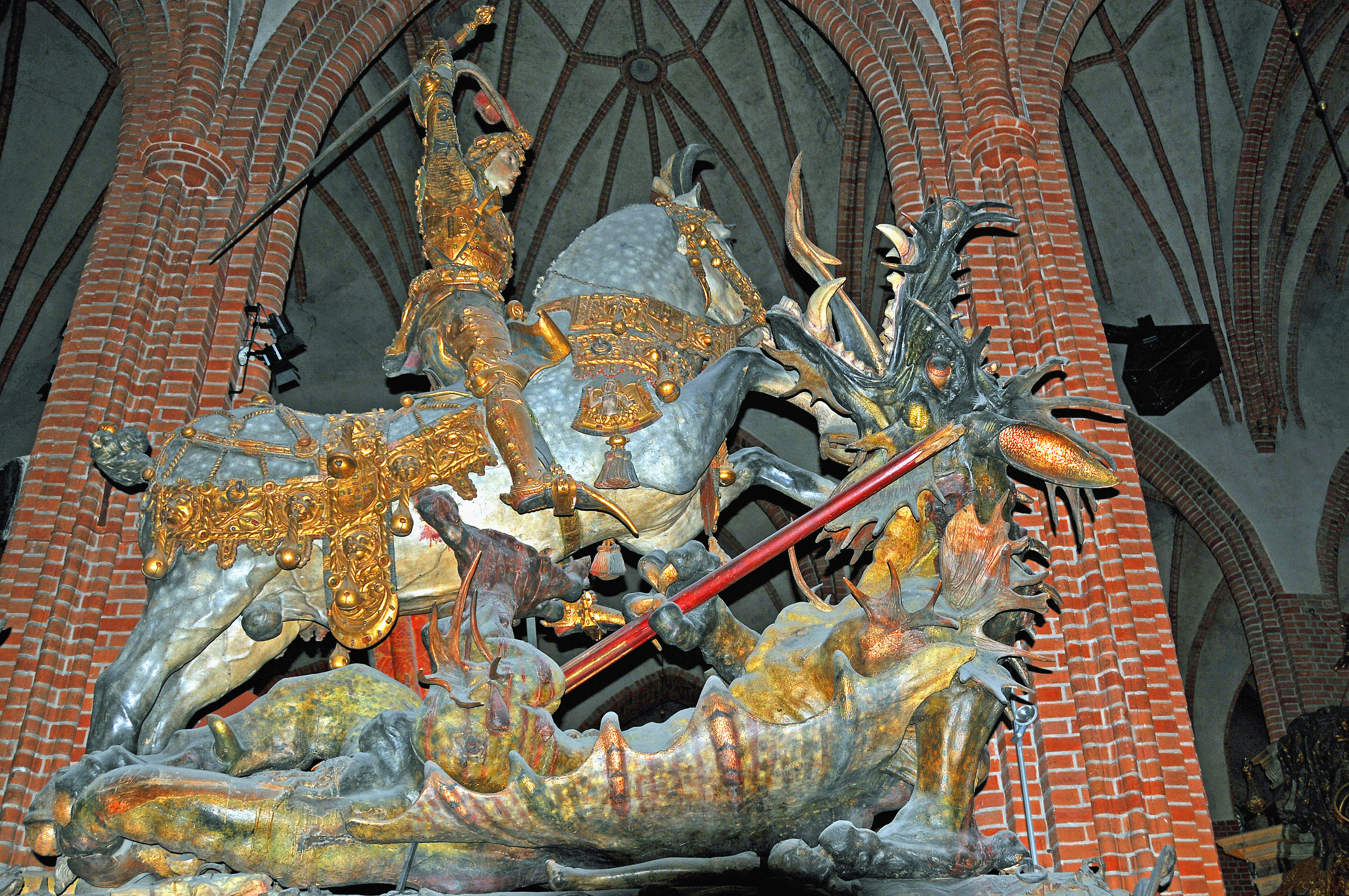
Saint George and the Dragon, commonly attributed to Bernt Notke, in Storkyrkan, Stockholm

At the Battle of Brunkeberg on 10 October 1471, which was fought around Brunkebergsåsen outside the northern gates of Stockholm, his Swedish separatist army triumphed against Danish King Christian I's Swedish unionist and Danish forces, injuring Christian and routing the unionist army. This victory elevated Sture to the position of a national savior. The sculpture Saint George and the Dragon in Storkyrkan in Stockholm, commonly attributed to the German sculptor Bernt Notke, was raised to commemorate the battle.

For a quarter of a century he ruled Sweden making the regency almost an office in its own right. He was supported by the peasantry, the commercial interests of the mining district of Bergslagen and the lower nobility, playing them out against the unionist high-ranked nobility and clergy and managing a difficult act of balance towards the Danish demands of reunion. In a meeting in Kalmar in 1483, the high nobility confirmed the new Danish king Hans as the true king of Sweden on condition of extensive privileges and guarantees granted to the high nobility, clergy and Privy Council, but Sture nevertheless managed to hold on to the political power for the time being, refusing to give up his office as Regent.

Sture's reign saw the foundation of the first Swedish university, Uppsala University, founded by Archbishop Jakob Ulvsson in 1477 with support from Sture.

In 1487, Sture fought a successful war against the powerful Tott dynasty, forcing them to cede Öland and Borgholm to Sweden, while Denmark received Gotland. As a result of the war, the power the Tott's held sharply declined.

In 1493, the Danish and Norwegian king, Hans (also called John I), formed an alliance with Ivan III of Russia against Sten Sture. From 1495 to 1497, Sten successfully repelled a Russian invasion of Finland. However, he subsequently fell out with the majority of the Swedish nobility, most prominently Svante Nilsson, and the Swedish Privy Council declared him to be deposed as regent on 8 March 1497.

== Second regency ==
In the ensuing war, Sten was supported by peasant forces, but they were defeated at the Battle of Rotebro by Hans of Denmark (also known as King John I of Denmark and Norway), who invaded Sweden in July the same year. On 6 October, Sten surrendered to King Hans in Stockholm and was reconciled with him. Hans was crowned King of Sweden, and Sten was given the highest position of authority in Sweden below the King. However, during the next rebellion against the Danes in 1501, he again took office as regent, leading the Swedish struggle for independence until his death. In May 1502, the unionist garrison in Stockholm, led by Queen Christina, capitulated due to severe starvation after a drawn-out siege. In early 1503 his forces were in control of Sweden apart from Kalmar and the island of Öland.

Sture used the capture of the Queen for propaganda purposes, personally accompanying the Queen to Halmstad in Denmark after a cease-fire had been negotiated by the Hanseatic League, in October 1503.

== Death and aftermath ==
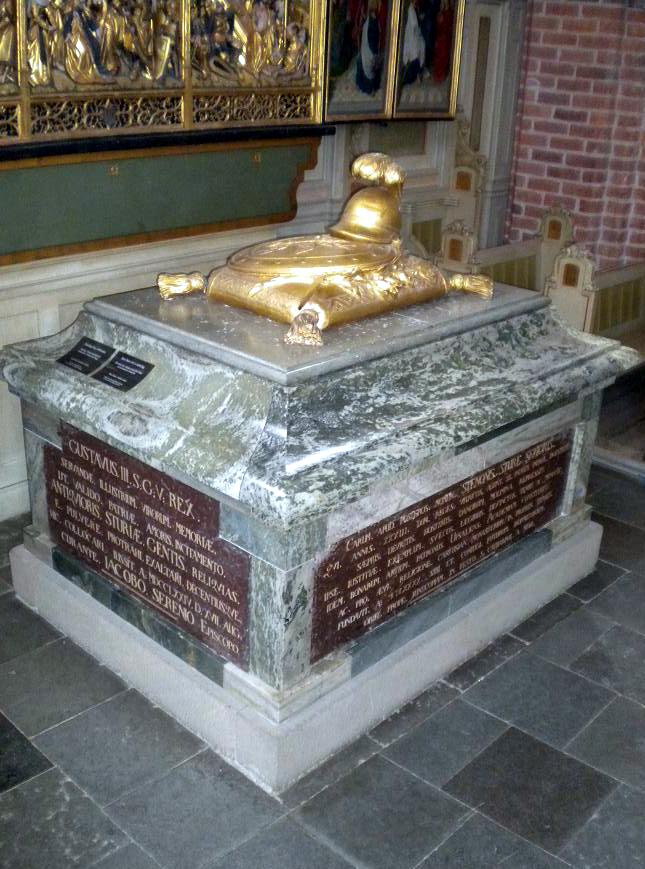
18th century burial monument in Strängnäs Cathedral

On his way back from Denmark, Sture fell ill and died on 14 December 1503. Bishop Hemming Gadh, who accompanied Sture on the journey, alerted Svante Nilsson at Stegeborg Castle. Sture's widow, Ingeborg Tott, who at the time was in control of the Stockholm garrison, was only presented with the news of her husband's death once Svante Nilsson had reached Stockholm. She was persuaded to turn over Stockholm Castle and received Häme Castle in Finland as compensation.

Sture had no legitimate children from his marriage with Ingeborg Tott, only a daughter born out of wedlock, Birgitta, who became a nun in Vadstena Abbey. The male line of the old Sture family, the Tre Sjöblad family, died out with Sten Sture. His closest relatives and heirs were his deceased sister's, the house of Vasa, and his nephew Erik Johansson Vasa, a knight and member of the Privy Council, inherited Sture's extensive personal domains in Södermanland and Uppland. Erik Johansson's son, the future King Gustav Vasa of Sweden had been born a few years before Sten's death. However, Erik Johansson was described by his contemporaries as a simpleminded and brutal man, prone to violent outbursts and on more than one occasion charged with manslaughter, and lacked the political skill of his uncle Sten Sture.

Regent Sten was succeeded by his colleague from the Privy Council and former enemy Svante Nilsson, of the Natt och Dag family, as regent. Svante Nilsson's son and successor, Sten Sture the Younger, later chose to adapt the Sture name for political purposes, despite only being distantly related.

== Burial and monuments ==
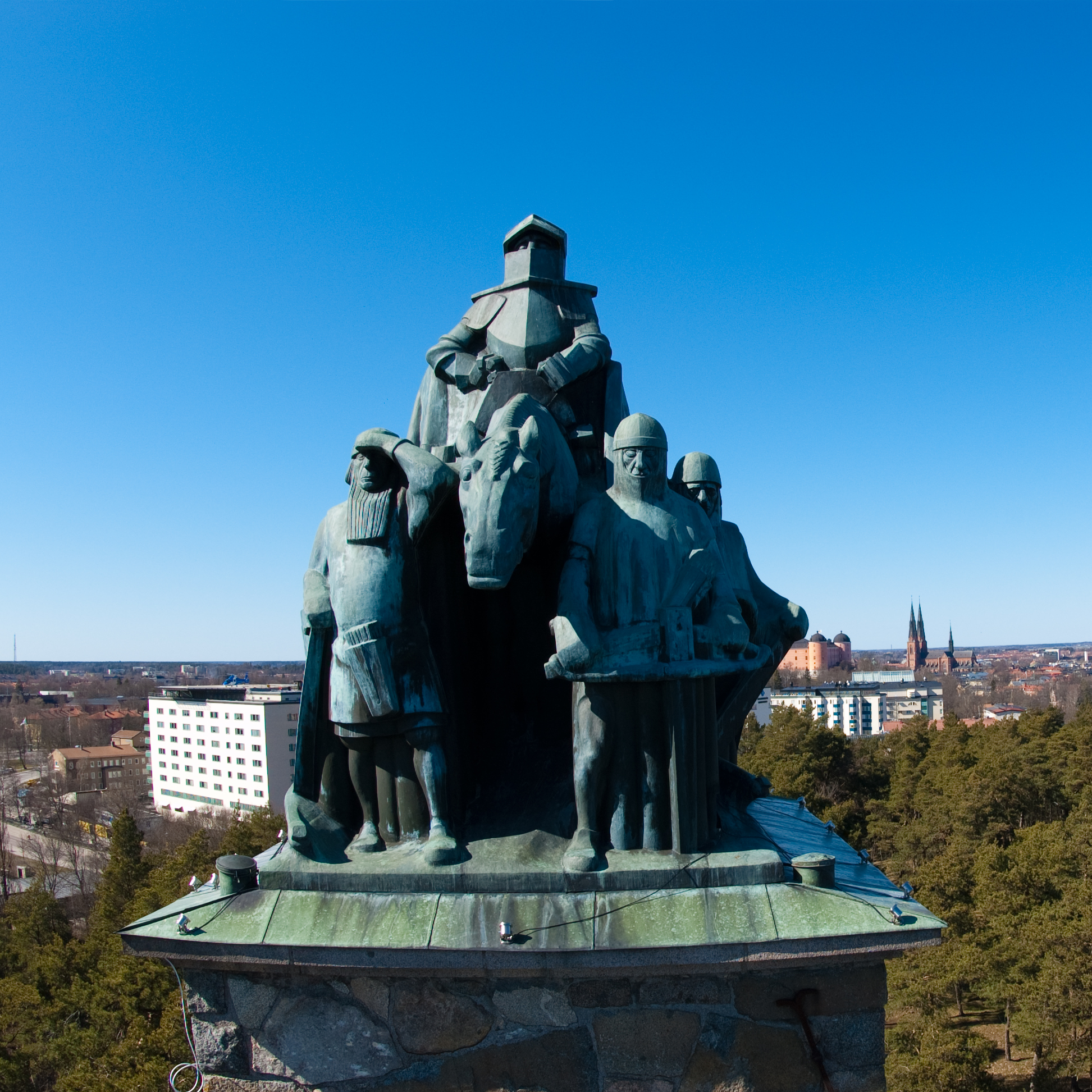
The Sten Sture Monument in Uppsala, by Carl Milles

To commemorate the victory at Brunkeberg, Sten Sture ordered a wooden monument for Storkyrkan in Stockholm, Saint George and the Dragon, built in the late 1480s. Saint George's horse carries the coat of arms of the Tre Sjöblad family, Sten Sture's coat of arms, and the monument is therefore interpreted as a symbol of his victory over Denmark, the dragon. A bronze copy of the monument was placed on Köpmantorget in Stockholm in 1912.

Sten Sture was buried in the church of Mariefred Charterhouse, which he had helped establish and made significant contributions to during his reign. His remains were moved to Strängnäs Cathedral during the reign of Gustav I, after the short-lived monastery was closed in 1526, during the Protestant Reformation. A memorial outside the town church of Mariefred marks the former site of the monastery. The present burial monument in the choir of Strängnäs Cathedral was ordered in 1774 by King Gustav III.

Sture became a prominent symbolic figure in the 19th century nationalist movement in Sweden, together with the early 15th century rebel leader Engelbrekt Engelbrektsson and King Gustav I who ended the Kalmar Union. A large stone monument to Sten Sture, by the sculptor Carl Milles (1875–1955), was inaugurated in Uppsala in 1925. There are several places and buildings named after Sten Sture in the town of Arboga in central Sweden, where Sten Sture was elected in 1471, due to the efforts of the local Sture society in the late 19th century. Stureparken was created for the 400th anniversary in 1871, and an obelisk dedicated to the memory of the election of Sten Sture was erected in the park in 1890.

== Notes ==
Sten Sture the Elder Born: 1440 Died: 14 December 1503
Regnal titles
Preceded by Charles VIII as King of Sweden	Regent of Sweden; 1470–1497	Succeeded by John II as King of Sweden
Preceded by John II as King of Sweden	Regent of Sweden; 1501–1503	Succeeded by Svante Nilsson
