= Philippe Dollinger =

French historian

Philippe Dollinger (born 1 December 1904 in Strasbourg; died 14 September 1999 in Strasbourg) was a French historian, known particularly for his work on the history of the Hanse.

== Biography ==
Philippe Dollinger attended the Gymnasium Fustel de Coulanges. Dollinger studied history at the University of Strasbourg. He was a pupil of Marc Bloch, Charles-Edmond Perrin and Lucien Febvre. In 1931 he pursued the Agrégation d'Histoire et géographie. From 1932 to 1945 he was a teacher at the Gymnasiums in Colmar, Reims, Strasbourg and Paris. From 1932 until 1934 he worked at the Institut francais in Berlin and in the Bavarian Archives. In 1945 Dolliner became professor of Alsatian history at the University of Strasbourg and became leader of the "Institut des hautes études alsaciennes". In 1947 he received his doctorate at the University of Strasbourg with the work L'évolution des classes rurales en Bavière depuis la fin de l'époque carolingienne jusqu'au milieu du treizième siècle. Dollinger also taught German history and from 1952 worked on the summary report on published books during the history of Germany in the Middle Ages. He was leader of the city archives and the city library in Strasbourg from 1948 until 1974. One year later he entered retirement as a university teacher.

== Writings (selected) ==
- Die Hanse. Kröner, Stuttgart 2012, ISBN 978-3-520-37106-5 (English translation published by MacMillan in 1970)
- La Hanse (XII. - XVII. siècles) (= Collection historique). Aubier, Paris, 1988, ISBN 2-7007-2216-7.
- Der bayerische Bauernstand vom 9. bis zum 13. Jahrhundert (= Publication de la Faculté des Lettres de l'Université de Strasbourg. Volume 112.) Beck, Munich 1982, ISBN 3-406-08433-8

== Bibliography ==
- Antjekathrin Graßmann: Philippe Dollinger (1904–1999). In: Hansische Geschichtsblätter vol. 119 (2001), pp. 1–3.
- François Joseph Fuchs: In Memoriam Philippe Dollinger (1904–1999). In: Revue d’Alsace vol. 126 (2000), pp. 6–8.
- Ulrich Pfeil: Vorgeschichte und Gründung des Deutschen Historischen Instituts Paris. Darstellung und Dokumentation. Instrumenta, vol 17. Thorbecke, Ostfildern 2007, p. 216, ISBN 3-7995-7917-6.
