= Jan Svanberg =

Swedish professor and historian

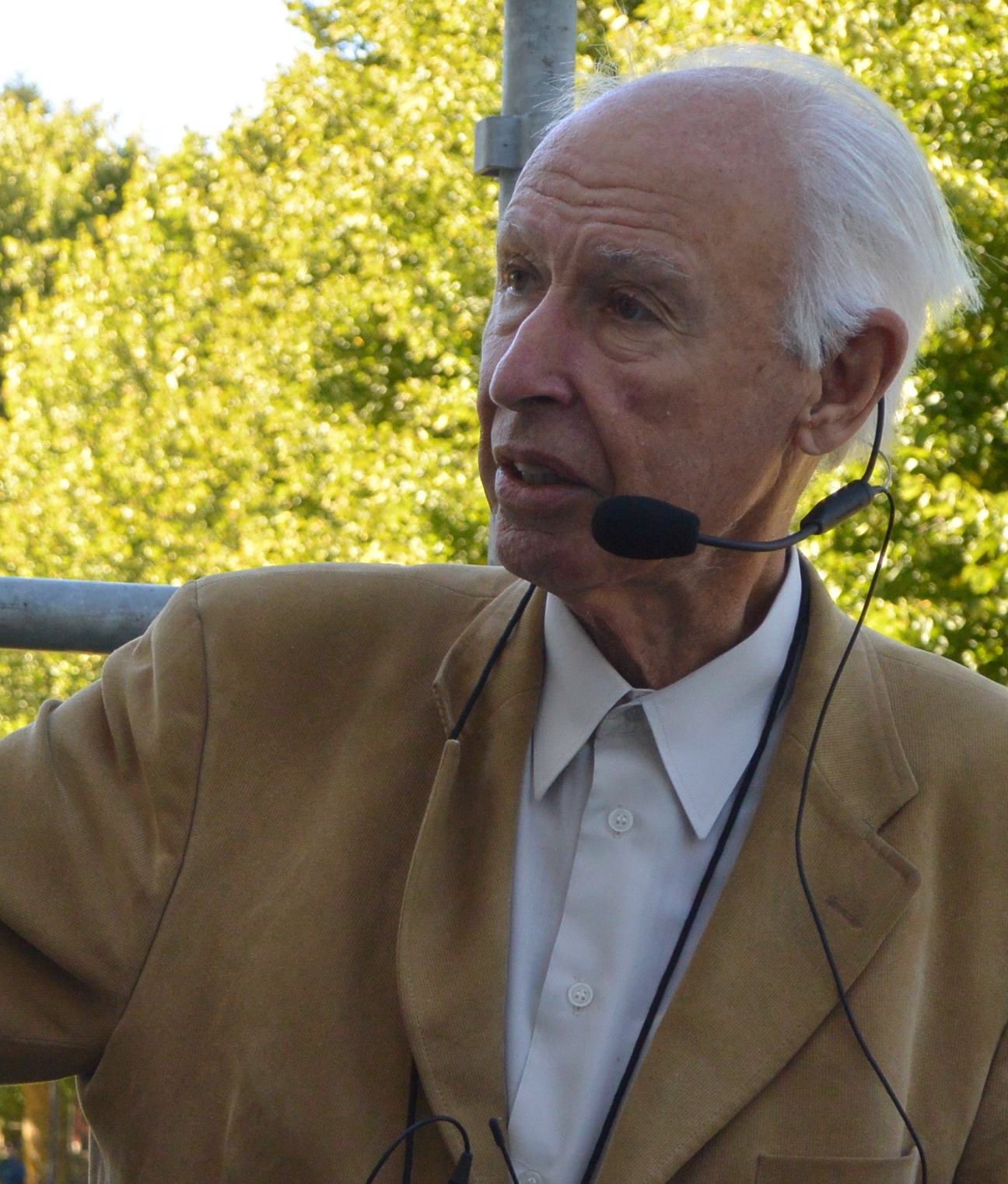
- Jan Svanberg in Gotland, 2016
- Born: June 18, 1935; Stockholm, Sweden
- Died: 21 April 2024 (aged 88)
- Occupations: Professor, art historian.
- Spouse: Birgitta Svanberg (m.1965-2013)
- Parents: Victor Svanberg; Inga Esbjörnsson

Jan Viktor Svanberg (18 June 1935 – 21 April 2024) was a Swedish art historian specialized in medieval art and professor emeritus of Art History at Stockholm University.

== Personal life ==
Jan Svanberg was the son of the literary historian Victor Svanberg and Inga Esbjörnsson, and the nephew of the Nordist Nils Svanberg. In 1965 he married the literary scholar and feminist Birgitta Svanberg.

== Education and university career ==
Svanberg graduated with a Bachelor of Arts in 1960, a Filosofie licentiat in 1965 and a Doctor of Philosophy in Stockholm in 1973.

He was a teacher at the Södermalmsskolan in 1961-1962 and a teacher in the Department of Art History at Stockholm University starting in 1962.

He was a Lecturer between 1974 and 1993, a Docent between 1981 and 1986, Prefekt (akademisk titel) between 1982-1989 and Professor between 1982-1983 and 1989. In 1994 he became a professor of art history at the University of Oslo. He was a fellow of the Norwegian Academy of Science and Letters from 1995.

== Honors and awards ==
In 1990, Jan Svanberg received the Samfundet S:t Erik plaque at the same time as Göran Dahlbäck.

== Bibliography ==
- Svanberg, Jan (1998) [1993]. Sankt Göran och draken. Tiden, Rabén Prisma.
- Svanberg, Jan; Hans Aili (2003). Imagines Sanctae Birgittae : the earliest illuminated manuscripts and panel paintings related to the revelations of St. Birgitta of Sweden. Vol. 1 Text, Vol.2 Plates. Royal Academy of Letters, History and Antiquities.
- Svanberg, Jan (2011). Västergötlands medeltida stenskulptur. Signum.
- Svanberg, Jan (2013). Medeltida byggmästare i Norden. Signum.
