= Köpmantorget =

Square in Gamla stan, Stockholm, Sweden

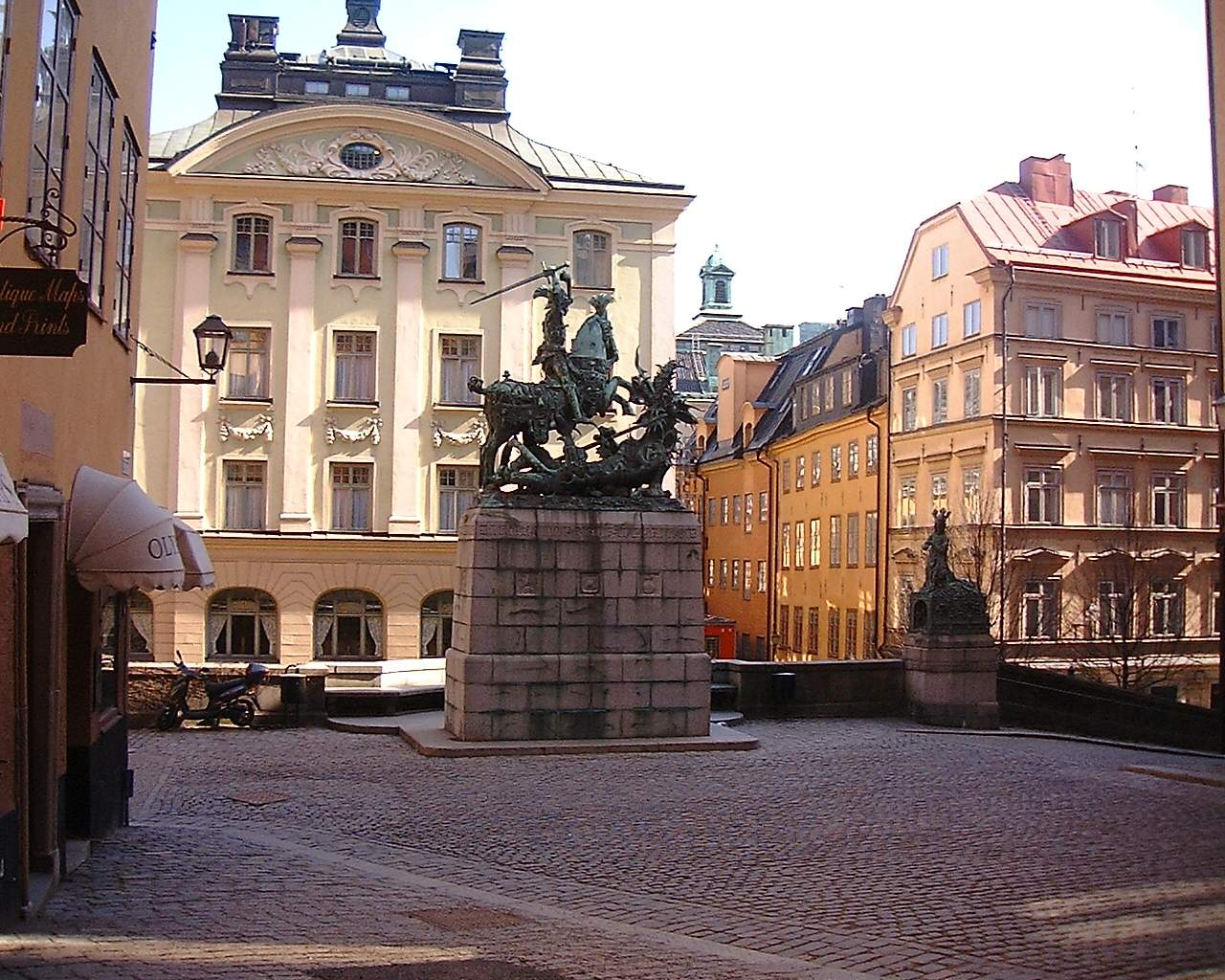
- Looking east to the sculpture Saint George and the Dragon on Köpmanbrinken, 2007

- Location within Stockholm
- Location: Gamla stan, Stockholm, Sweden
- Coordinates: 59°19′30.4″N 18°04′24.8″E
- North: Köpmanbrinken
- South: Köpmanbrinken
- West: Köpmangatan

Köpmantorget (Swedish: "Merchant's Square") is a small public square in Gamla stan, the old town in central Stockholm, Sweden. It is located between the street Köpmangatan to the west and between two slopes collectively named Köpmanbrinken, both of which lead down to the street Österlånggatan. On its western side, two streets lead north and south: Bollhusgränd and Baggensgatan respectively.

== History ==
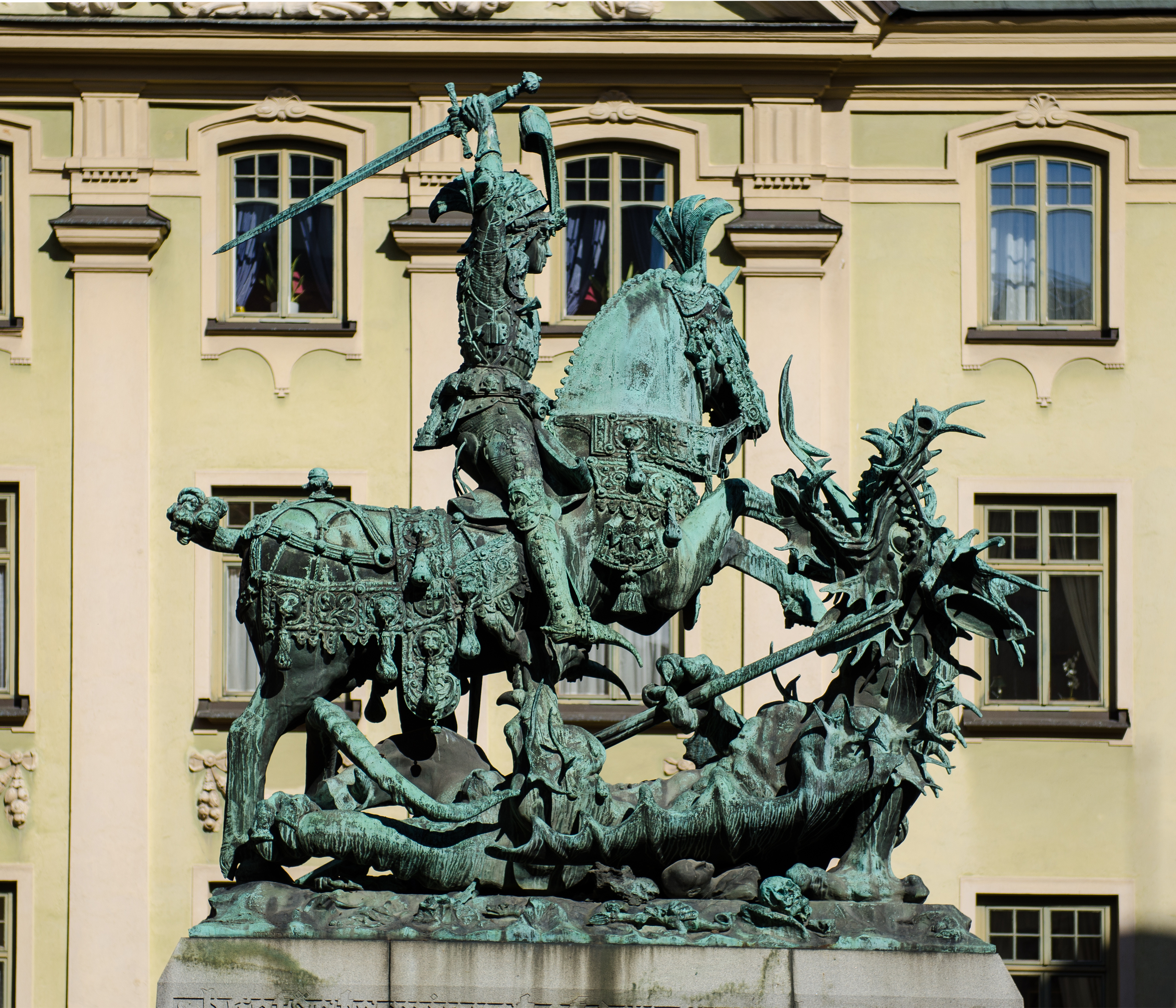
St George and the Dragon sculpture

This small square was, notwithstanding the name, never used as a market. Instead, when it first appeared in historical records on a map dated 1733 as Kiöpmanne T., it was named after its location on the eastern end of Köpmangatan, the street leading to Stortorget, the square which used to be the main market place in Stockholm for centuries. Before 1685, the two blocks north and south of the square were united and on the location was a vault (Köpmanvalvet) during the Middle Ages forming one of the city gates (Köpmanporten). The penultimate name referring to the square appears in historical records as late as 1728 in the form Kiöpmans Hwalwet. In 1912, the bronze sculpture Saint George and the Dragon, a replica of Bernt Notke's original, was placed in the square. The original is in Storkyrkan.

== See also ==
- List of streets and squares in Gamla stan
