= Battle of Haraker =

- Part of the 1463–1464 Swedish uprising against Christian I
Date	17 April 1464
Location	Haraker, Västmanland, Sweden 59°47′11″N 16°25′55″E
Result	Swedish separatist victory
Territorial changes	Unionists retreat to Stockholm Castle.

Belligerents
(History of Sweden (800–1521)) Swedish separatists	(Medieval Denmark) Denmark; Swedish unionists

Commanders and leaders
(History of Sweden (800–1521)) Kettil Karlsson (History of Sweden (800–1521)) Sten Sture the Elder	(Medieval Denmark) Christian I

Strength
Unknown	Unknown

Casualties and losses
Unknown	1,200–1,400 killed (Swedish estimate)
- Location of Haraker in Sweden with present-day administrative borders.

The Battle of Haraker was fought on 17 April 1464 at the village of Haraker, Västmanland, approximately 20 kilometers north of the city of Västerås in Sweden. The Swedish separatist army, under the command of the Bishop of Linköping, Kettil Karlsson, defeated King Christian I's Danish army.

== Background ==
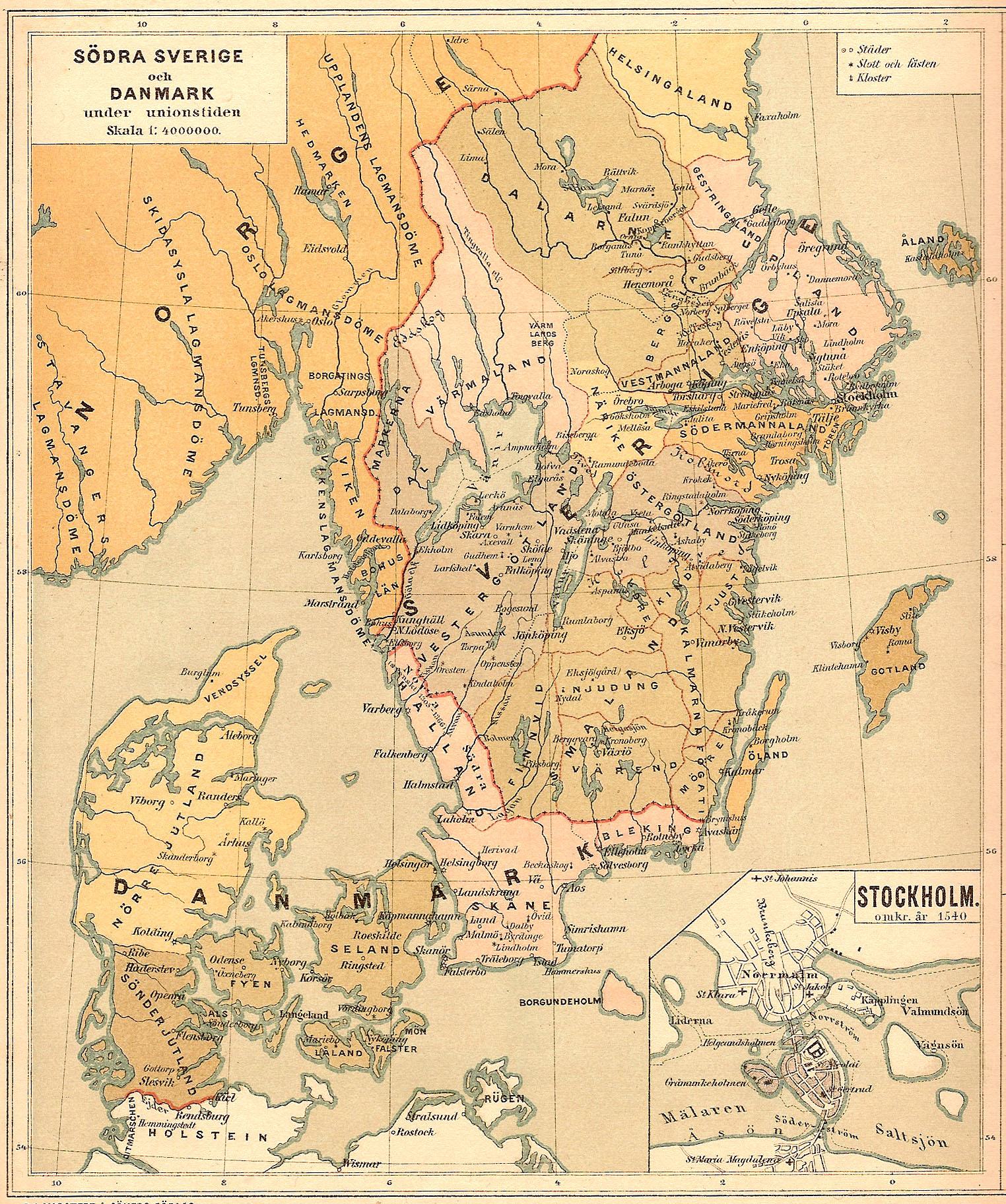
Denmark and southern Sweden in the late 15th century.

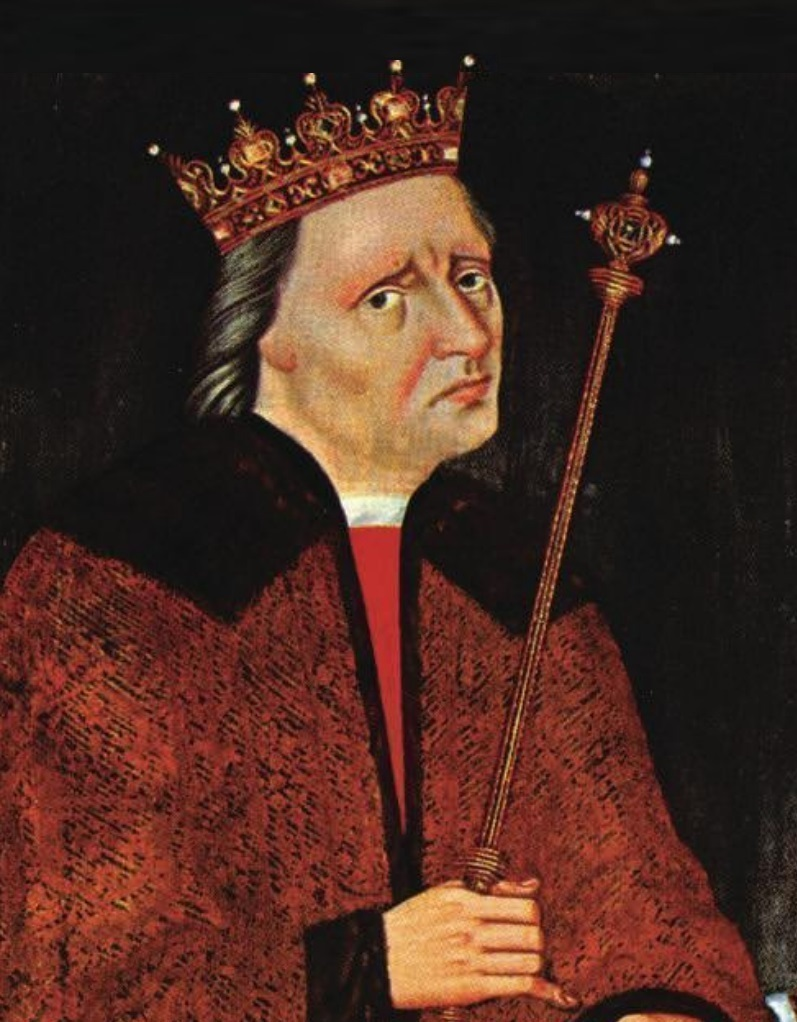
King Christian I of Denmark, Norway and Sweden. Contemporary portrait at Frederiksborg Castle.

The battle was part of a long series of conflicts and civil wars between unionists and separatists during the Kalmar Union era in the 15th century. The Danish King Christian I of the house of Oldenburg had ruled Sweden supported by the unionist party since 1457, with the deposed Swedish rival King Charles Canutesson, of the house of Bonde, living in exile in Danzig. However, there was widespread opposition to Christian's rule, and Christian travelled to Sweden to act against the rumours of Charles's imminent return. When the Archbishop of Uppsala, Jöns Bengtsson Oxenstierna, acting as viceroy on behalf of King Christian during the King's stay in the Swedish province of Finland, gave in to tax protestors and postponed the collection of a ship tax from the peasantry of Mälardalen, King Christian had Jöns Bengtsson imprisoned and brought to Copenhagen on his return in August 1463.

The news of the Archbishop's imprisonment caused an uprising among the peasantry of Mälardalen, led by the Archbishop's Oxenstierna and Vasa relatives in the high nobility. Peasant militia from Uppland marched on Stockholm, but were crushed by the unionist troops under the command of Lord High Constable Ture Turesson Bielke on Helgeandsholmen outside the northern gates of Stockholm, in the massacre at Helgeandsholmen on 21 August 1463.

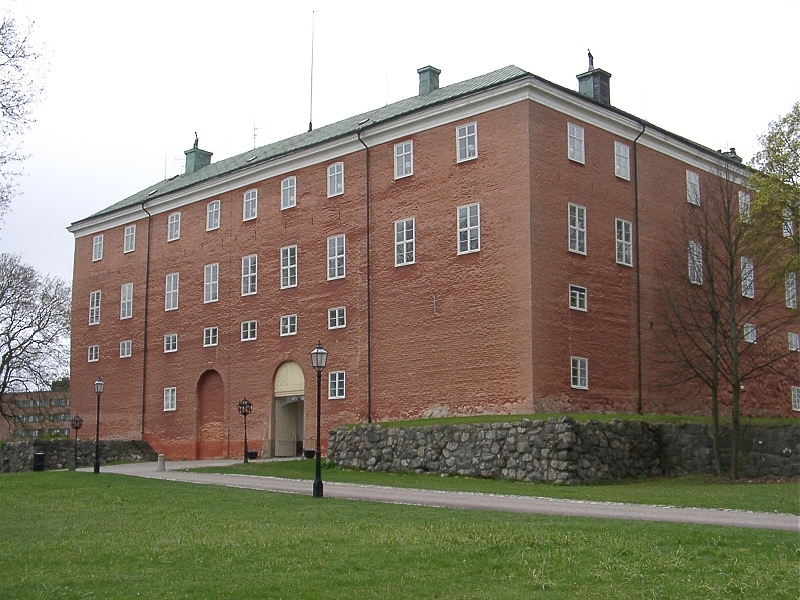
Västerås Castle

The young Bishop of Linköping, Kettil Karlsson of the Vasa family, took up arms and organised the uprising in Östergötland in the winter of 1463/1464, briefly laying siege to Stockholm before retreating in the face of Christian's army approaching from the south. He then travelled to Dalecarlia and Västmanland, where he gathered an army largely made up of peasant militia and Swedish separatist nobles, among them the future Regent of Sweden, Sten Sture the Elder. In February Kettil Karlsson was named Captain-General and commander-in-chief by the separatists. King Christian marched west from Stockholm and laid siege to Västerås Castle, which was held by Bishop Kettil's uncle, Nils Kristiernsson Vasa. With Kettil Karlsson's army gathering north of Västerås, Christian then marched north to meet the rebels.

The Diarium Vadstenense's account of the events was likely recorded around the time of the death of Charles Canutesson in 1470, with the unknown author taking a strong stance for King Charles, while portraying the Danish King Christian as a greedy coward and the bishops, Kettil Karlsson and Jöns Bengsson, as traitorous schemers.

== Battle ==
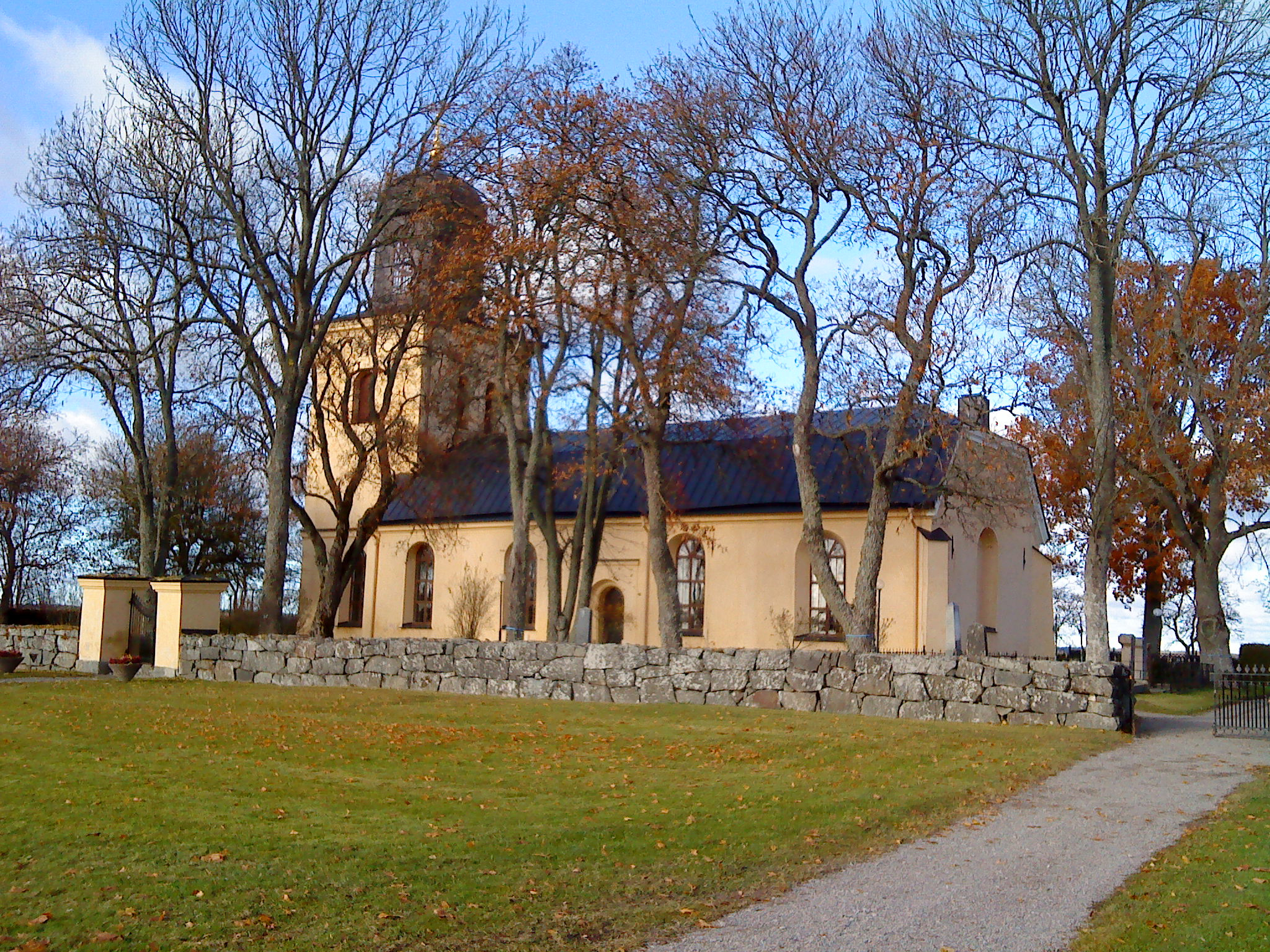
Haraker Church

Kettil Karlsson's army was heavily fortified in the terrain of Hälla Forest north of Haraker Church, making good use of the forest terrain. King Christian's professional army had superior numbers of trained knights and made camp south of the forest, resting briefly before the King ordered the attack on the rebel positions. While initially successful against the militia, the Danish troops were drawn further into the forest, losing their cavalry advantage and forcing the knights to fight on foot. The Danish troops suffered heavy losses fighting their way through a series of fortified positions. The rebel defenders then opened fire from a hidden position in the forest, catching the Danish troops by surprise and forcing them to retreat through flanking Swedish fire. Once back in the open field, a decisive charge by Kettil Karlsson's heavy cavalry reserve broke the Danish lines, forcing the Danish army to retreat to a defensive position at Haraker Church before returning to Västerås under the cover of darkness. The Diarium Vadstenense mentions the battle, describing the royal army's losses as significant. Swedish sources estimate the Danish losses at around 1,200–1,400 men, although King Christian later in a letter to the Hanseatic City of Lübeck described his losses as considerably smaller.

== Aftermath ==
Christian was forced to break the siege of Västerås Castle and returned to Stockholm Castle, which subsequently was besieged by the separatists. An attempt by unionists under Ture Turesson Bielke to land an army in Västmanland was defeated by Kettil Karlsson's separatists at Kvicksund. Christian left Stockholm Castle under Ture Turesson's command and returned to Denmark. He was eventually forced to release Archbishop Jöns Bengtsson due to political pressure from the Church and abroad, reconciling with the Archbishop.

The battle significantly strengthened the separatist cause, making Kettil Karlsson effective ruler of most of central Sweden and prompting the return of King Charles Canutesson, who was hailed as king by the separatists. However, a conflict between Charles and the bishops, Jöns Bengtsson and Kettil Karlsson, soon arose after Jöns Bengtsson's arrival in Stockholm, with the bishops getting the upper hand, excommunicating and again deposing the King. Kettil Karlsson ruled as Regent of Sweden for half a year in 1465 before dying from bubonic plague. Jöns Bengtsson became Regent upon Kettil Karlsson's death but was driven to retire by the Privy Council, replacing him as Regent with Charles' follower Erik Axelsson Tott. Charles Canutesson would eventually return to rule Sweden a third time in 1467 until his death in 1470. The Battle of Brunkeberg in 1471, where the separatists were commanded by Regent Sten Sture the Elder, one of the separatist leaders at the Battle of Haraker, would eventually give the separatists the upper hand in Swedish politics during most of the final decades of the 15th century.

== Literature ==
- Harakers hembygdsförening (1998), Harakersbygden, Harakers hbf, Haraker.
- Harrison, Dick (2002), Karl Knutsson – en biografi, Historiska media, Lund, ISBN 91-89442-58-X.
- Harrison, Dick (2013), Historiebloggen: Slaget vid Haraker. Svenska Dagbladet online edition, 24 August 2013.
- Kumlien, Kjell (1940), Karl Knutsson i Preussen 1457–1464 – ett inslag i Östersjöområdets historia under det 13-åriga krigets tid, Kungl. Vitterhets- Historie och Antikvitetsakademiens handlingar del 46:2, Stockholm.
- Tuneld, Erik (1828), Geografi öfver konungariket Sverige, 8:e uppl andra bandet (Nerike Westmanland Dalarne), Ecksteinska tryckeriet, Stockholm.
