= Kettil Karlsson (Vasa) =

- Vasa coat of arms in the 15th century.

Regent of Sweden
- Reign: February 1464 - August 1464
- Predecessor: Christian I of Sweden
- Successor: Charles VIII of Sweden
- Reign: 26 December 1464 - 11 August 1465
- Predecessor: Charles VIII of Sweden
- Successor: Jöns Bengtsson (Oxenstierna)
- Born: c. 1433
- Died: 11 August 1465
- House: House of Vasa
- Bishop of Linköping
- Church: Roman Catholic Church
- Archdiocese: Uppsala
- Diocese: Linköping
- Elected: 1458
- Installed: 1460
- Predecessor: Nils König
- Successor: Henrik Tidemansson

Personal details
- Denomination: Roman Catholic
- Residence: Linköping Castle
- Parents: Karl Kristiernsson (Vasa); Ebba Eriksdotter (Krummedige)
- Education: University of Rostock; University of Leuven

Kettil Karlsson (Vasa) (c. 1433 – 11 August 1465) was a Swedish clergyman, diplomat, military leader and statesman during the Kalmar Union era. He was a member of the house of Vasa. At age 25, he was elected Bishop of Linköping. He rebelled against King Christian I in 1463, was Captain General (rikshövitsman) and de facto regent of Sweden from February to August 1464, stepping down during the brief return of King Charles Canutesson from exile. After falling out with King Charles, Kettil Karlsson was subsequently elected Lord Protector and Regent (riksföreståndare) of Sweden from 26 December 1464 to his death.

== Biography ==
=== Family and education ===
Kettil Karlsson was the son of Karl Kristiernsson (Vasa), Swedish Privy Councillor (riksråd) and Castellan (hövitsman) of Raseborg Castle, and Ebba Eriksdotter (Krummedige), daughter of the Danish Steward of the Realm and Privy Councillor Erik Segebodsen Krummedige, giving him family connections in the high nobility of both kingdoms. He was given an ecclesiastical education and was enrolled on 19 August 1454 at the University of Rostock, later also at the University of Leuven on 16 June 1455.

=== Church career ===
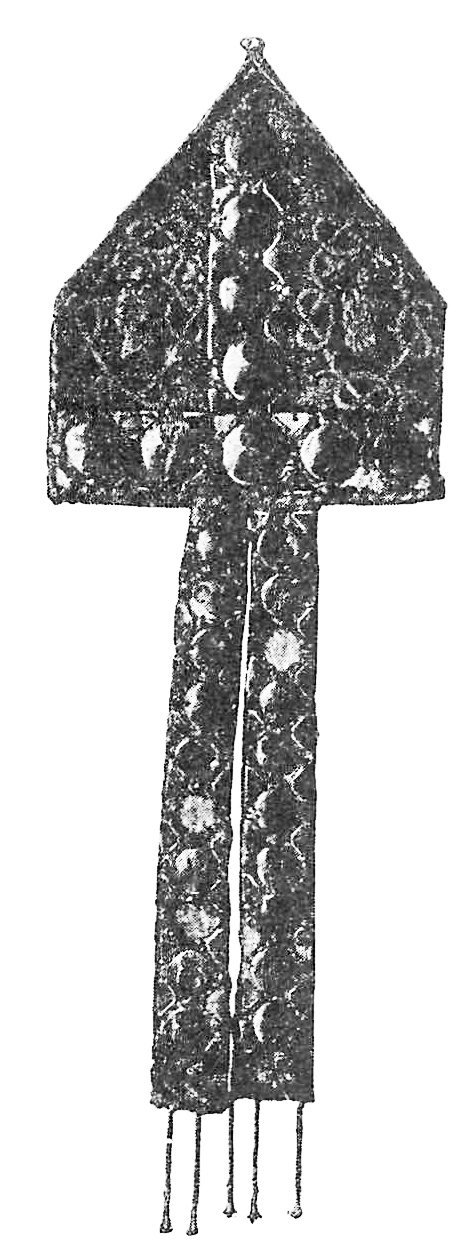
Mitre of Kettil Karlsson as Bishop of Linköping. The original is exhibited in Statens historiska museum in Stockholm.

After obtaining a master's degree he returned to Sweden and served as canon in Uppsala, where his cousin Jöns Bengtsson Oxenstierna was Archbishop. Through his family connections he fell in favour with King Christian I of Denmark, Norway and Sweden, shortly after Christian became King of Sweden in 1457. King Christian recommended him as Coadjutor Bishop of Linköping, to serve under the aging Bishop Nils König, in a letter to Pope Callixtus III in February 1458. Nils König died just two months later, in April 1458, and the cathedral chapter chose Kettil Karlsson as his successor. Kettil Karlsson travelled to Rome to seek papal confirmation for his appointment. However, the approval was not given at first, seemingly due to Kettil Karlsson's young age (25) which required a papal dispensation. On a subsequent journey to Mantua, where the Bishop-elect also served as diplomat to the Holy See on behalf of King Christian, Pope Pius II granted the confirmation and dispensation on 24 September 1459. Kettil Karlsson was then received formally as Bishop of Linköping in 1460.

=== Rise to power ===
The deposed King Charles Canutesson had been in exile in Danzig since 1457. In the early 1460s, rumours about Charles' imminent return caused Christian I to attempt to increase his political control over Sweden.

In 1463, Archbishop Jöns Bengtsson Oxenstierna, who had been governing Sweden during King Christian's stay in Finland, was imprisoned by the King on his return and brought to Copenhagen, over the Archbishop's refusal to carry out the King's tax policies. The Archbishop's Oxenstierna and Vasa relatives, among them Kettil Karlsson, took up arms against the King, gathering a peasant militia and noble supporters. Kettil Karlsson became leader of the uprising in Östergötland and northern Småland, laying siege to the unionist-controlled royal castles. His relatives gathered their forces in the northern provinces of Västmanland, Dalecarlia and Uppland, where resistance among the farmers and miners against Christian's tax and foreign trade policies was strong. In February 1464 Kettil Karlsson was elected in Västerås as Captain general of the Swedish separatists. He briefly laid siege to Stockholm but broke off the siege on receiving news of Christian I's Danish army approaching from the south, plundering Kettil Karlsson's residence at Linköping Castle on their way.

Kettil Karlsson's separatist army won a decisive victory against King Christian's Danish unionist army on 17 April 1464 at the Battle of Haraker, north of Västerås. A subsequent attempt by the unionist Lord High Constable Ture Turesson Bielke to land troops in Västmanland was defeated by Kettil Karlsson's militia from Rekarne at Kvicksund. However, Stockholm remained in the unionists' control, and the separatists lacked a fleet to blockade Stockholm harbour. A Riksmöte called by Bishop Kettil and the separatist party recalled the exiled King Charles Canutesson, who brought a fleet and mercenary troops. The city of Stockholm was captured by the separatists, who hailed Charles Canutesson as King on 9 August 1464, but Stockholm Castle remained in the hands of Ture Turesson's unionists.

Meanwhile, Archbishop Jöns Bengtsson had been released from Danish captivity due to political pressure from the Church and abroad, reconciling with King Christian. The Archbishop's arrival in Stockholm caused a conflict between the bishops and King Charles Canutesson, which rapidly escalated into open warfare. Joining forces with Ture Turesson's garrison at Stockholm Castle, the bishops soon made King Charles' position untenable.

=== Regentship and death ===
Kettil Karlsson was elected Lord Protector and Regent of Sweden on 26 December 1464, with Jöns Bengtsson as co-ruler, and on 30 January 1465 King Charles abdicated, instead receiving the castles of Raseborg and Korsholm in Finland. Bishop Kettil's rule was brief. He died from the plague on 11 August 1465 at Stockholm Castle and was buried below the altar of Linköping Cathedral. On his death, Jöns Bengtsson became sole Regent of Sweden.

== Aftermath and legacy ==
Jöns Bengtsson was deposed and replaced as Regent by the Privy Councillor Erik Axelsson Tott in 1466, who in 1467 brought Charles Canutesson back as King for a third regency. The conflict between the separatist party, led by the Sture family, and unionists under Erik Karlsson (Vasa), flared up in 1469, with Sten Sture the Elder, one of the separatist noble leaders from Kettil Karlsson's 1464 uprising, commanding the separatist army. After King Charles' death in 1470, Sten Sture was elected Regent. Sten Sture defeated Christian I at the Battle of Brunkeberg in 1471, leaving the Sture separatist party in control of Sweden for another generation. Gustav Eriksson Vasa (1496–1560), Kettil Karlsson's half cousin once removed, would eventually rise to the leadership of the separatist party and was elected King of Sweden in 1523, marking the beginning of the house of Vasa as hereditary royal dynasty of Sweden.

== Literature ==
- Gillingstam, Hans (1952). Ätterna Oxenstierna och Vasa under medeltiden: släkthistoriska studier. Stockholm: Almqvist & Wiksell.
- Harrison, Dick (2004). Karl Knutsson: en biografi. Svenska regenter. Lund: Historiska media. ISBN 91-85057-54-1
- Vasaätten, 4. Kettil Karlsson in Nordisk familjebok (2nd edition, 1921)

Kettil Karlsson (Vasa) House of Vasa Born: 1433 Died: August 11 1465
Catholic Church titles
Preceded by Nils König	Bishop of Linköping; 1459–1465	Succeeded by Henrik Tidemansson
