= Landgrave of Wedellsborg =

The Landgrave of Wedellsborg was a Danish noble title held by the Wedel family for most of its modern history. The estate of Wedellsborg, near Tranderup Parish, was formerly known as Husbygaard. The estate was first held as a manor but was later elevated into a county.

== Lords of Husbygaard/Iversnæs ==
Ruler	Born	Reign	Death	House	Consort	Notes
Niels Hamundsen Little	13th century	1295-1330	1330?	Litle (Hvide)		
Anders Pedersen Stygge		1330-1350	1350?	Galen (Hvide)		
Nicolaus Krummedige	14th century	1350-1390	1390?	Krummedige		
Berneke Skinkel	14th century	1390-1418	1418?	Stinkel		
Otto Berneksen Skinkel	14th century	1418-1449	1449?	Stinkel		
Hilleborg Ottosdatter Skinkel	15th century	1449	1494	Stinkel	Knud Henriksen Gyldenstierne	Daughter of the preceding
Knud Henriksen Gyldenstierne	15th century	1449-1467	1467	Gyldenstierne (noble family)	Hilleborg Ottosdatter Skinkel	Married into the estate
Henrik Knudsen Gyldenstierne	15th century	1467-1517	1517	Gyldenstierne (noble family)	Karen Bentsdatter Bille	Son of the preceding
Karen Bentsdatter Bille	15th century	1517-1540	1540	Bille (noble family)	Henrik Knudsen The Golden Paths	Wife of the preceding
Mogense Henriksen Gyldenstierne/Knud Henriksen (bishop)/Christopher Henriksen Gyldenstierne	15th century	1540-1562	1562?	Gyldenstierne (noble family)		Sons of the preceding
Henrik Christophersen Gyldenstierne	16th century	1562-1604	1604	Gyldenstierne (noble family)		Son of Christopher Henriksen Gyldenstierne
Gabriel Christophersen Gyldenstierne	16th century	1604-1610	1610	Gyldenstierne (noble family)		Son of the preceding
Niels Henriksen Gyldenstierne	16th century	1610-1622	1622	Gyldenstierne (noble family)		Son of the preceding
Hans Johansen Lindenov	1573	1622-1642	1642	Lindenov		Presumably a royal grant
Hans Hansen Lindenov	1616	1642-1659	1659	Lindenov	Elisabeth Augusta Lindenov	Son of the preceding married royalty
Elisabeth Augusta Lindenov	1623	1659-1664	1677	House of Oldenburg		Wife of the preceding, bastard daughter of Christian IV of Denmark
Christian Urne	17th	1664	unknown	Urne (noble family)		Unknown
Hannibal Sehested (governor)	1609	1664-1666	1666	Sehested (noble family)	Christiane Sehested	Married a daughter of Christian IV of Denmark
Christiane Sophie Hannibalsdatter Sehested	17th century	1666	unknown	Sehested (noble family)	Wilhelm Friedrich Wedell	Passed the land to husband Wilhelm Friedrich Wedell

== Landgrave of Wedellsborg ==
Ruler	Born	Reign	Death	House	Consort	Notes
Wilhelm Friedrich Wedell	1640	1666-1706	1706	Wedel family	Christiane Sophie Hannibalsdatter Sehested	Lordship erected into a Landgraviate in 1672, Lordship also renamed to Wedellsborg
Hannibal Wedell	1660	1706-1708	1708	Wedel family	Anne Catharine Christiansdatter Banner	Son of the preceding
Anne Catharine Christiansdatter Banner	17th century	1708-1725	After	Banner (Noble family)	Hannibal Wedell	Wife of the preceding, regency for underage son
Christian Wedell	1701	1725-1759	1759	Wedel family	Mathia Catharina Werenskiold	Son of the preceding
Hannibal Wedell II	1731	1759-1766	1766	Wedel family	Catharine Sophie Wilhelmine Moltke	Son of the preceding, committed suicide
Ludvig Frederik Wedell	1753	1766-1817	1817	Wedel family	Frederikke Juliane Louise von Klingenberg	Son of the preceding
Hannibal Wilhelm Wedell	1780	1817-1828	1828	Wedel family	Louise Theodata von Warnstedt	Son of the preceding
Karl Wedell	1806	1828-1882	1882	Wedel family	Rosa von Krogh	Son of the preceding
Julius Wilhelm Georg Ferdinand Wedell	1807	1882-1883	1883	Wedel family	Christiane Louise von Buchwaldt	Brother of the preceding
Bendt Wedell	1840	1883-1922	1922	Wedel family	Maria Elisabeth Knuth	Son of the preceding
Julius Wedell	1881	1922-1963	1963	Wedel family	Inger Wedell	Son of the preceding
Tido Wedell	1908	1963-1982	1982	Wedel family	Irene Wedell	Son of the preceding
Bendt Wedell II	1975	1975–present	alive	Wedel family	Unknown	Son of the preceding, largest private landowner in Denmark
