= Ture Turesson (Bielke) =

Swedish statesman and military commander

Ture Turesson (Bielke) (1425–1489/90) was a Swedish statesman and military commander and a prominent leader of the unionist party during the Kalmar Union period. He was a Privy Councillor and Castellan of Axvall Castle during the reign of separatist King Charles Canutesson, before defecting to the unionist side in 1452, spending several years in exile in Denmark. He was appointed Lord High Constable of Sweden, Castellan of Stockholm and Kalmar and Captain-General during the reign of King Christian I, and commanded the unionist forces during several major battles during the turbulent 1460s, before surrendering to Sten Sture the Elder's separatists in 1472. During his later years he was Lawspeaker of the province of Öland.

== Biography ==
=== Early years ===
Bielke coat of arms.

Ture Turesson belonged to the Bielke noble family, one of the oldest and most influential noble families in Sweden. He was born in 1425, as the son of the recently deceased Lawspeaker and Privy Councillor Ture Stensson (Bielke) by his widow from his second marriage, Margareta Eriksdotter Krummedige, daughter of the Danish Steward of the Realm, Erik Segebodsen Krummedige. He was raised in the household of his stepfather Kristiern Nilsson (Vasa), Lord High Steward of Sweden and a leader of the unionist party in the high nobility. Although connected to the separatist leader, Charles Canutesson, by the marriage of his half-sister Birgitta Turesdotter to Charles, his family strongly opposed Charles' separatist movement. His stepfather's opposition caused Charles Canutesson's men to arrest Kristiern Nilsson in January 1439 at the family estate of Revelsta, injuring Ture Turesson's mother. Charles had the family holdings confiscated. Kristiern Nilsson was later reinstated in his offices by the Danish unionist King Christopher of Bavaria, but died in Vyborg in 1442 after a compromise had been negotiated.

=== Under King Charles Canutesson ===
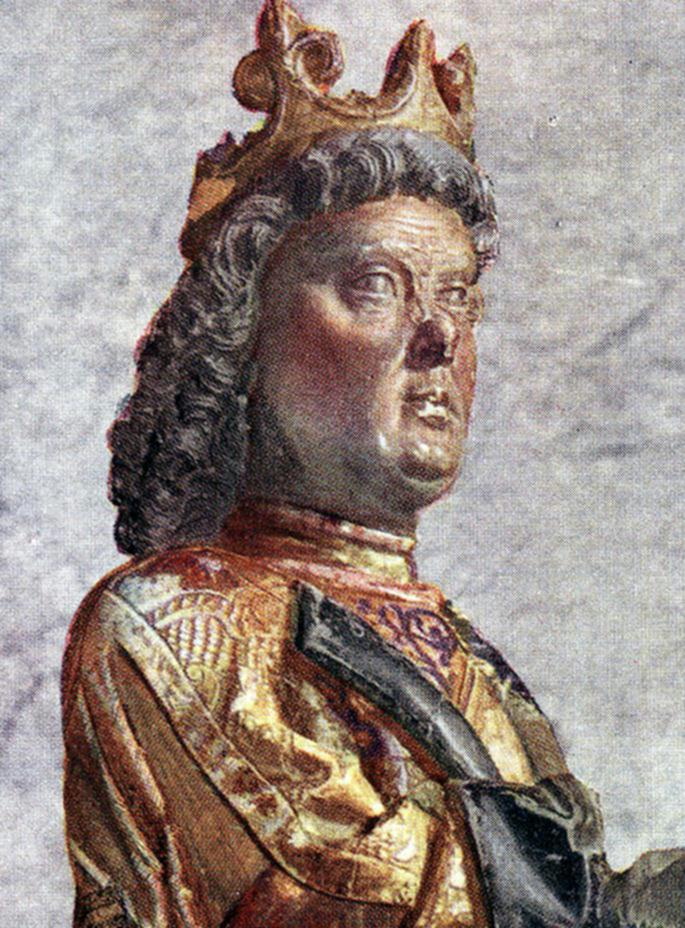
Charles Canutesson, twice-deposed and reinstated King of Sweden. 15th-century sculpture by Bernt Notke.

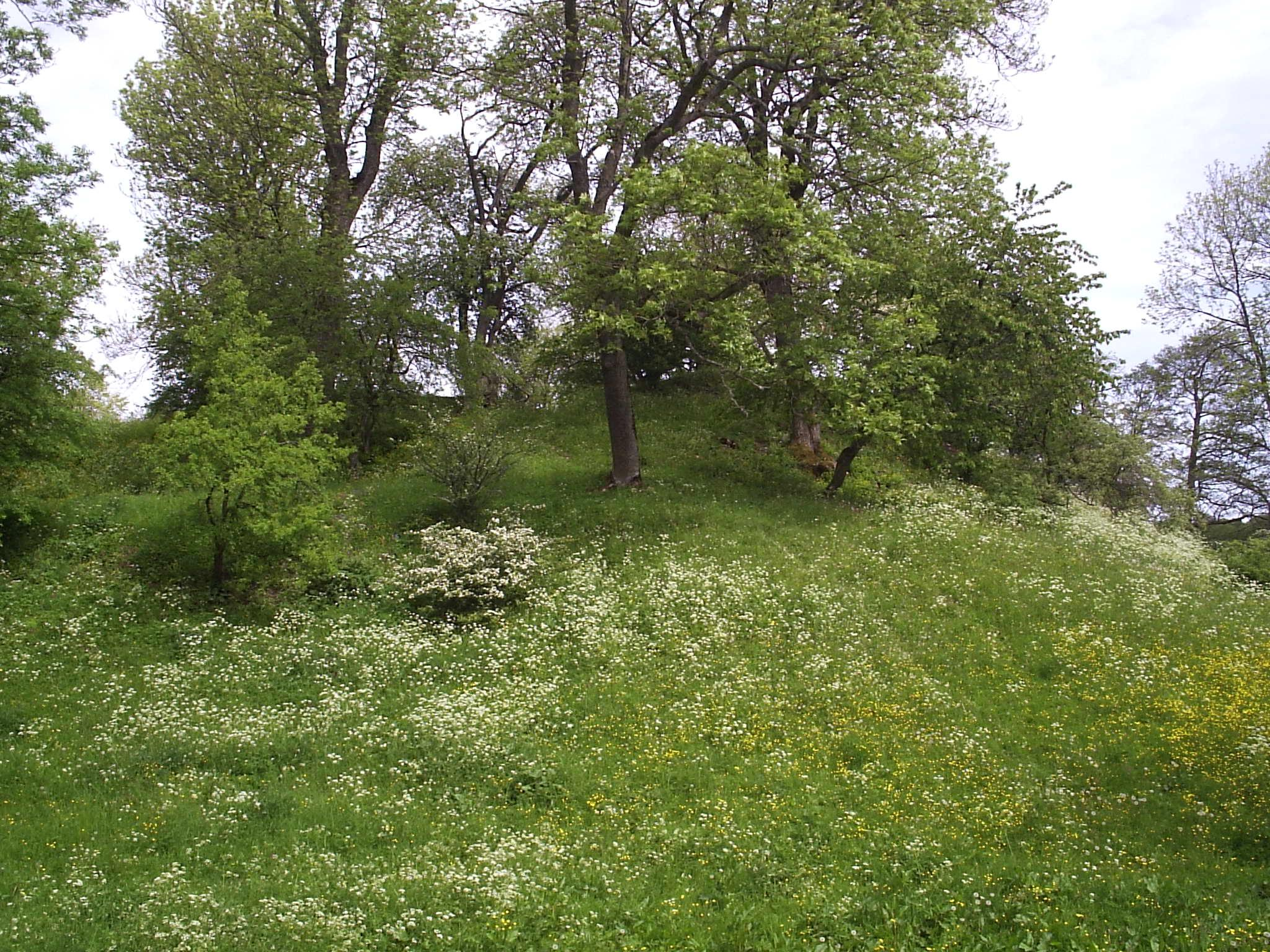
Present-day site of the ruins of Axvalla Castle.

Ture Turesson was knighted at the coronation of Charles Canutesson as King of Sweden in 1448, and is mentioned as Privy Councillor in 1450. In the same year he was appointed Castellan of Axvall Castle by King Charles, a strategically important royal castle near Skara in western Sweden. A conflict arose over the inheritance of the family estate in Kråkerum after Erik Turesson (Bielke), Ture Turesson's half-brother, died without issue in 1450. Ture Turesson quickly acted to secure the estate for himself, but in 1451 King Charles ruled in favour of his own son-in-law Erik Eriksson (Gyllenstierna), another claimant through his marriage to Erik and Ture Turesson's niece. Erik Eriksson seized the estate, which caused Ture Turesson to accuse the King of ruling in the case despite having a strong conflict of interest.

In 1452 war was declared between King Charles and King Christian I of Denmark, and Ture Turesson participated in the Swedish attack on Skåne and Halland. According to the contemporary rhyme chronicle Karlskrönikan, which relates a pro-separatist version of events, Ture Turesson was reluctant to enter hostilities with the Danish army, keeping his actions to a minimum, and distrust reigned between him and King Charles. King Christian's Danish army, under the command of the Danish Marshal of the Realm, Claus Rønnow, entered Västergötland in May 1452, continuing to the east into Småland and capturing Jönköping in July. The Bishop of Skara, Bengt Gustavsson (Tre Rosor), publicly declared for the unionist King Christian with many of his influential family members, and Charles Canutesson feared further defections. Furthermore, the Danish commander Claus Rønnow became in 1454 Ture Turesson's brother-in-law, marrying his younger sister Birgitte Kristiernsdotter. Charles Canutesson made arrangements for his loyal relative Tord Bonde to relieve Ture Turesson of his command at Axvall Castle, ordering Ture Turesson to aid Tord Bonde during a meeting in Vadstena.

=== Defection ===
During a raid on Lödöse, Tord Bonde captured documents seen as evidence of Ture Turesson's correspondence with Per Stygge, one of the commanders in Christian I's army, leading Tord Bonde to confront Ture Turesson at Axvall Castle and to arrest Ture Turesson with his men for treason. Ture Turesson was imprisoned at Varnhem Abbey. Before the arrival of King Charles, Ture Turesson managed to escape to Rumlaborg Castle in present-day Huskvarna, where his relative Eggert Krummedigge was in command. Ture Turesson and Krummedigge left Rumlaborg to join with King Christian in Denmark, ordering the garrison to resist capture by Charles Canutesson.

Rumlaborg was captured by the separatists in October, and on 15 September 1453 a court convened by King Charles condemned Ture Turesson and other unionist defectors as traitors, forfeiting their lands to the Crown and sentencing them to death in their absence. Meanwhile, Ture Turesson entered the war on the unionist side in late 1452, participating in Danish raids on Swedish-occupied Blekinge. For several years he lived in exile in Danish service.

=== Under King Christian I ===
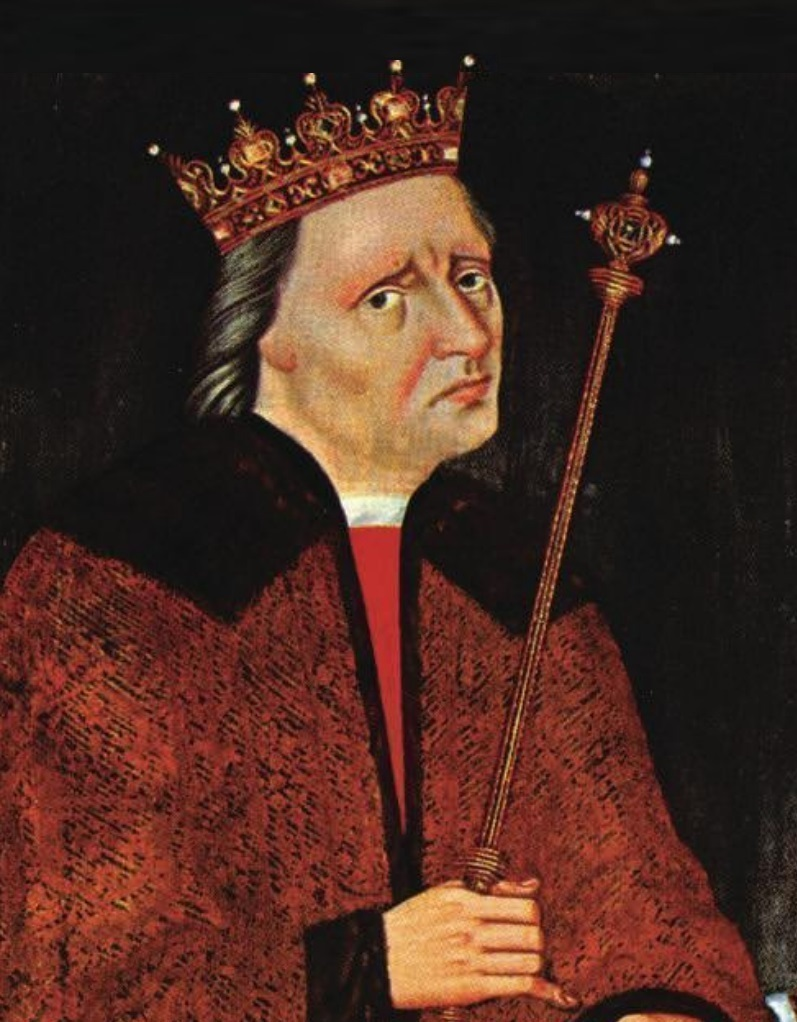
Christian I, King of Denmark, Norway and Sweden.

Charles Canutesson was deposed as King in 1457 and Christian I was crowned King of Sweden. As one of the leading Swedish nobles in Christian's service, Ture Turesson was amply rewarded for his unionist loyalties and was made Lord High Constable of Sweden, Captain-General and Castellan of Stockholm Castle and Kalmar Castle, with his Swedish possessions and inheritance claims restored to him.

In 1463, during rising opposition to Christian I's taxation policies, the King arrived in Stockholm to repress the rebel sentiments and to prevent the return of Charles Canutesson from exile. The King replaced Ture Turesson with Jöns Bengtsson (Oxenstierna), Archbishop of Uppsala, as the King's highest-ranking representative and Castellan in Stockholm, in order to better appease the growing resentment. Ture Turesson accompanied the King to Finland in July. On their return in August, the Archbishop was imprisoned and brought to Denmark by the King, with Ture Turesson reinstated as Castellan of Stockholm. The King ruled that the Archbishop had exceeded the boundaries of his authority as regent by making large concessions to the opposition regarding the contended taxation policies.

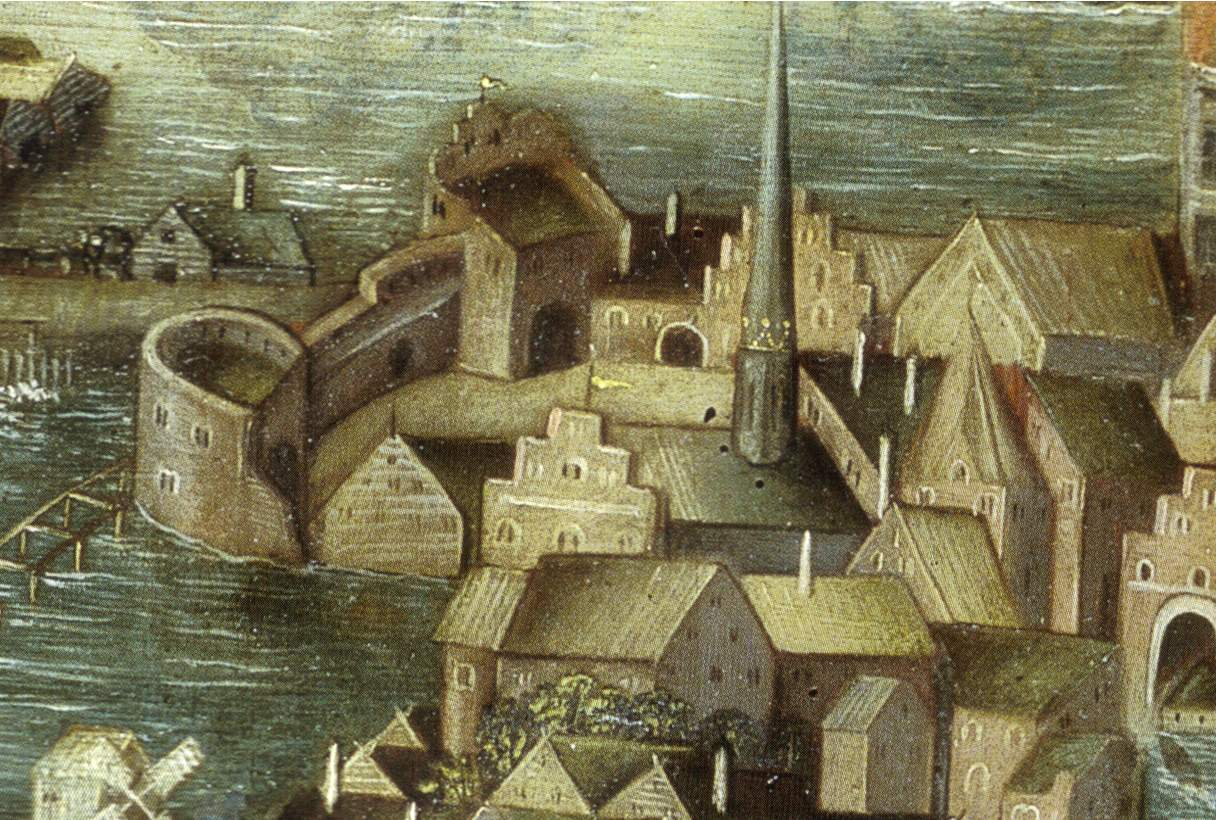
Helgeandsholmen in Stockholm with the Church of the Holy Ghost, detail from a copy of a 16th-century painting.

The resulting uprising among the Archbishop's relatives and the populace of the Archbishop's province of Uppland led to the Battle of Helgeandsholmen on 21 August. Ture Turesson's royal army crushed the Uppland militia before the northern gates of Stockholm, cutting down the militia almost to the last man, including those who had fled into sanctuary in the Church of the Holy Ghost. The battle earned Ture Turesson a reputation as a ruthless commander and "butcher of peasants" among his opponents.

After the capture of the Archbishop, his relative Kettil Karlsson (Vasa), Bishop of Linköping, took up arms against the King, organising a major uprising in the provinces of Småland and Östergötland. Ture Turesson's garrison in Stockholm successfully resisted a siege by the rebels, who retreated upon the arrival of King Christian with reinforcements in the spring of 1464. However, King Christian's royal army was lured into an ambush at the Battle of Haraker north of Västerås on 17 April, suffering a decisive defeat. A subsequent attempt by Ture Turesson to land an army from Lake Mälaren was repelled by the separatists at Kvicksund. The royal army was forced to retreat to Stockholm Castle, and by Midsummer Stockholm was surrounded by the separatist army, making Bishop Kettil Karlsson the effective ruler of most of Sweden apart from the few remaining royal garrisons. King Christian left Stockholm Castle in Ture Turesson's command and returned to Denmark to raise additional reinforcements.

In August 1464, the burghers of Stockholm opened the city gates for Charles Canutesson, who had returned from his exile in Danzig after receiving word of the uprising and was hailed as King. Ture Turesson's garrison remained in control of the strongly fortified Stockholm Castle. However, the return of Archbishop Jöns Bengtsson caused friction between the Bishops' party and King Charles Canutesson, eventually escalating into open warfare. Ture Turesson exploited the split by allying himself with the bishops which made Charles Canutesson's position in the city of Stockholm indefensible; Charles was forced to abdicate on 30 January 1465. Bishop Kettil Karlsson died in 1465, leaving the Archbishop as Regent of Sweden.

Ture Turesson gave up control of Stockholm to the Archbishop, leaving for Kalmar Castle which he still held as Castellan. This brought him away from the centre of Swedish politics; he continued to fight Charles Canutesson's supporters in Småland and remained loyal to King Christian. In 1466 the Archbishop was replaced by Erik Axelsson Tott as Regent of Sweden, who openly aligned himself with Charles Canutesson's supporters, and in 1467 Charles Canutesson returned as King for a third time.

The death of Charles Canutesson in 1470 did not bring an end to the conflict. The new separatist leader Sten Sture the Elder besieged Kalmar Castle briefly in 1471, but was forced to abandon the siege. Ture Turesson fought on Christian I's side and was defeated at the Battle of Brunkeberg in 1471. Many unionist nobles, including Ture Turesson and Claus Rønnow, were subsequently captured by Sten Sture the Elder's separatists. Ture Turesson was later released and organised the defence of Kalmar against the separatists. In 1472, he abandoned the unionist cause by surrendering Kalmar and acknowledged Sten Sture as Regent of Sweden, in return for being allowed to remain in possession of his lands and civil offices.

=== Under the Sten Sture regency ===
Ture Turesson is repeatedly mentioned as Lawspeaker of the province of Öland during the 1470s and 1480s, but had likely already held the office for a long time during that period.

During his later years, he was not given any new military commands or governorships, but as a member of the Privy Council he remained active in the affairs of the realm. In August 1489 he is mentioned as part of a Swedish noble delegation to King John of Denmark, and is subsequently mentioned as deceased on 1 March 1490.

== Legacy ==
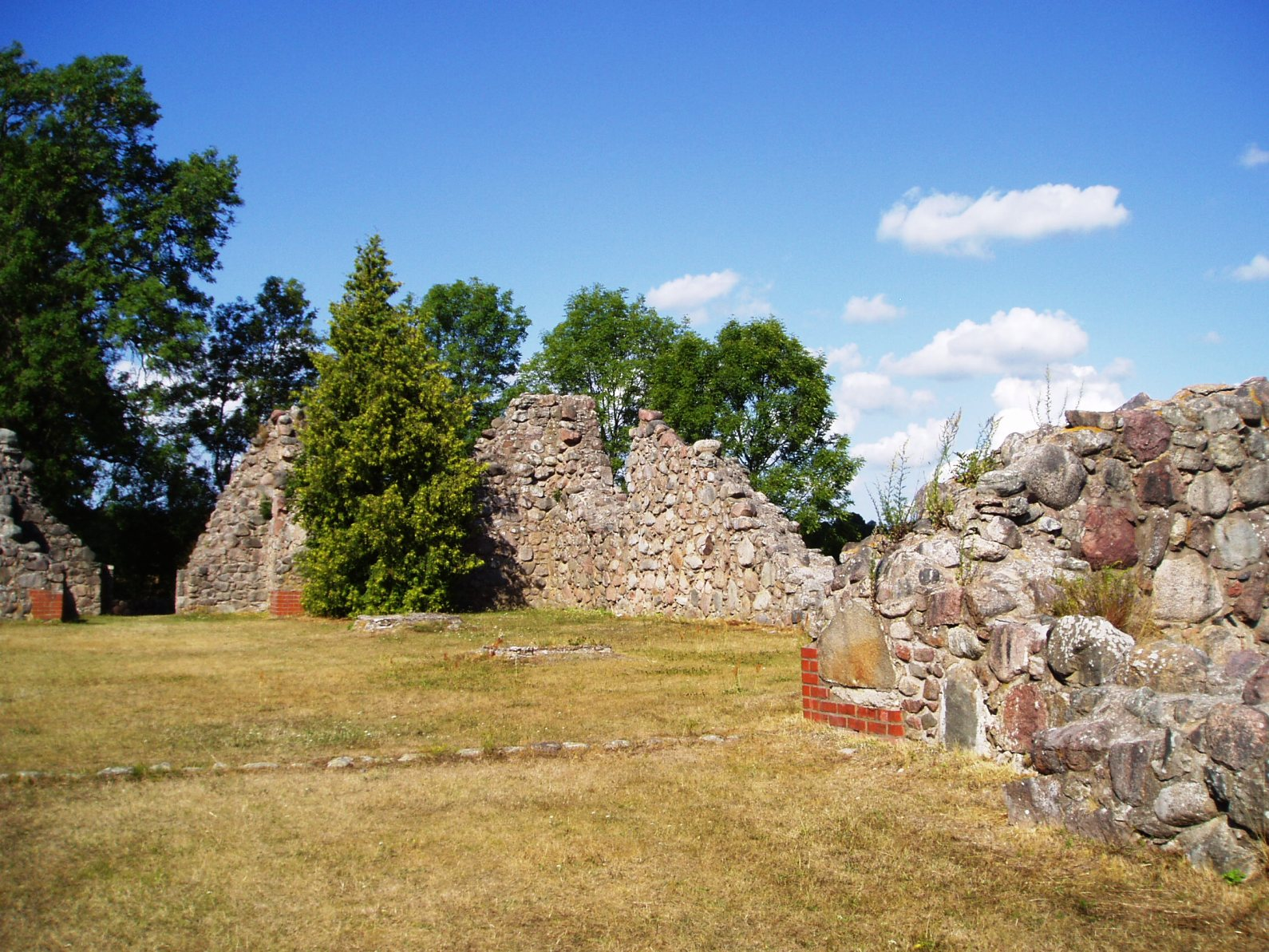
Present-day site of the ruins of Kronobäck Abbey.

Ture Turesson made significant contributions to the Church, in particular to Vadstena Abbey and contributed to the foundation of the Hospitaller's abbey in Kronobäck near Mönsterås 1479—80. He was subsequently buried in Kronobäck Abbey. Shortly before his death he founded the Franciscan monastery of Saint Claire on Torkö Island in Blekinge, on land donated from his personal estates.

== Family and children ==
Around 1450 he married Ingegärd Pedersdotter Kyrning, (died 1504), daughter to the Scanian noble Peder Kjeldsen Kyrning and Karen Björnsdotter (Björn).

Ture and Ingegärd's children were:

- Sten Turesson (Bielke), knight and Privy Councillor, Lawspeaker of Västmanland, died after 1520
- Peder Turesson (Bielke), knight and Privy Councillor, Castellan of Stäkeholm Castle, died 1520
- Erik Turesson (Bielke), knight and Privy Councillor, Castellan of Vyborg Castle, died 1511
- Nils Turesson (Bielke)]], knighted at the Holy Grave in Jerusalem around 1490, died 1493
- Olof Turesson (Bielke), died without issue
- Margareta Turesdotter (Bielke), married Mourids Nielsen (Gyldenstierne), died 1507.
- Barbara Turesdotter (Bielke), died 21 October 1485
- Birgitta Turesdotter (Bielke), died 8 October 1513, married Arvid Trolle (died 1505) at Lagnö on 23 September 1488
- Anna Turesdotter (Bielke), died at Erikstad on 23 April 1513, married on 1 June 1488 at Toftaholm to Gustav Olsson (Stenbock).

== Literature ==
- This article is mainly based on: Carlsson, G. (1924), "Ture Turesson (Bielke)", in Svenskt biografiskt lexikon, vol. 4, p. 153. (in Swedish)
- "Bielke. 4. Ture Turesson B." in Nordisk familjebok, 2nd ed., 1905, vol. 3., p. 323-324. (in Swedish)
