= Massacre at Helgeandsholmen =

Massacre of peasants from Uppland in 1463

- Part of the Uprising against Christian I
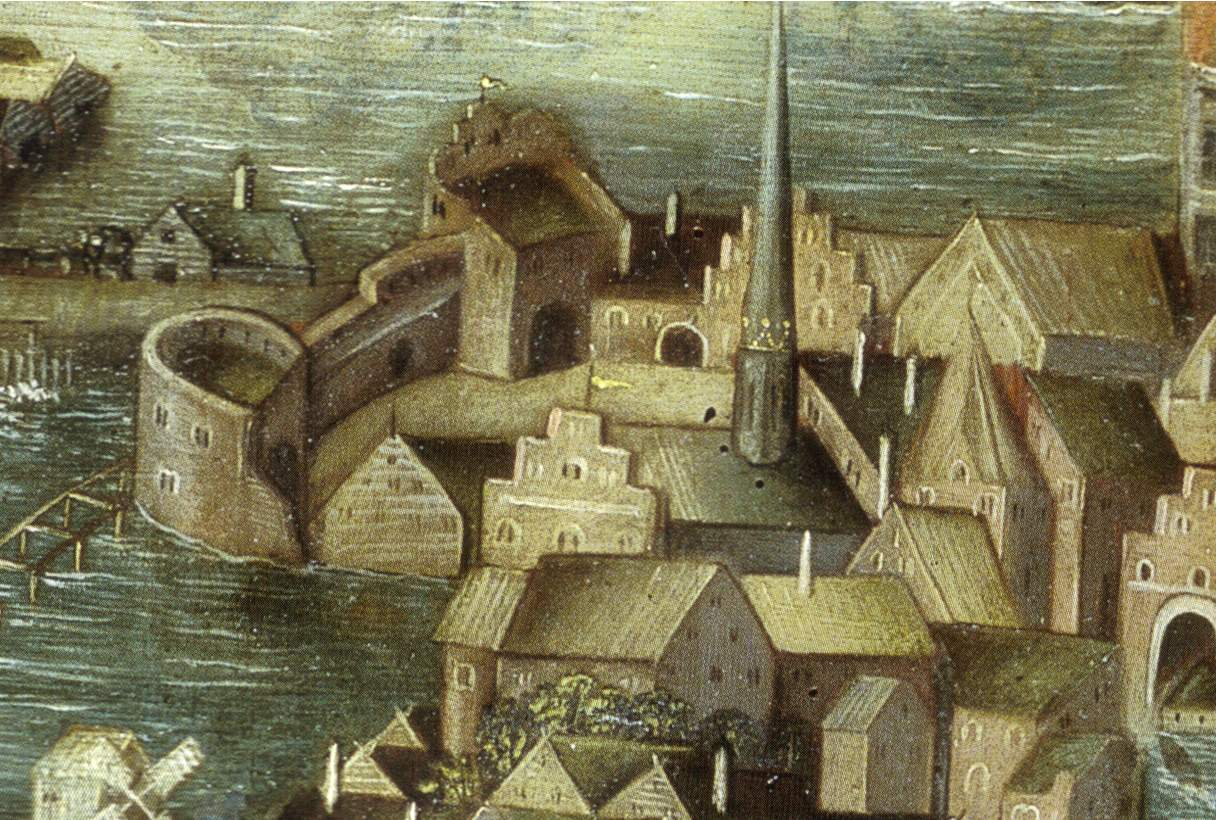
- Detail from Vädersolstavlan showing Helgeandsholmen in 1535
- Native name: Massakern på Helgeandsholmen
- Location: 59°19′40″N 18°4′11″E; Helgeandsholmen, Sweden
- Date: 1463
- Target: Peasants from Uppland
- Attack type: Massacre
- Deaths: 60–1,000 killed
- Perpetrator: Denmark
- Motive: Revenge for an uprising

The Massacre at Helgeandsholmen, also called the Battle of Helgeandsholmen (Swedish: Slaget på Helgeansholmen) was a massacre by Danish troops under Ture Turesson Bielke against peasants from Uppland who had marched to Stockholm to protest the new tax and the imprisonment of Archbishop Jöns Bengtsson Oxenstierna. The massacre has been noted to be one of the lesser known massacres in Swedish history by Dick Harrison.

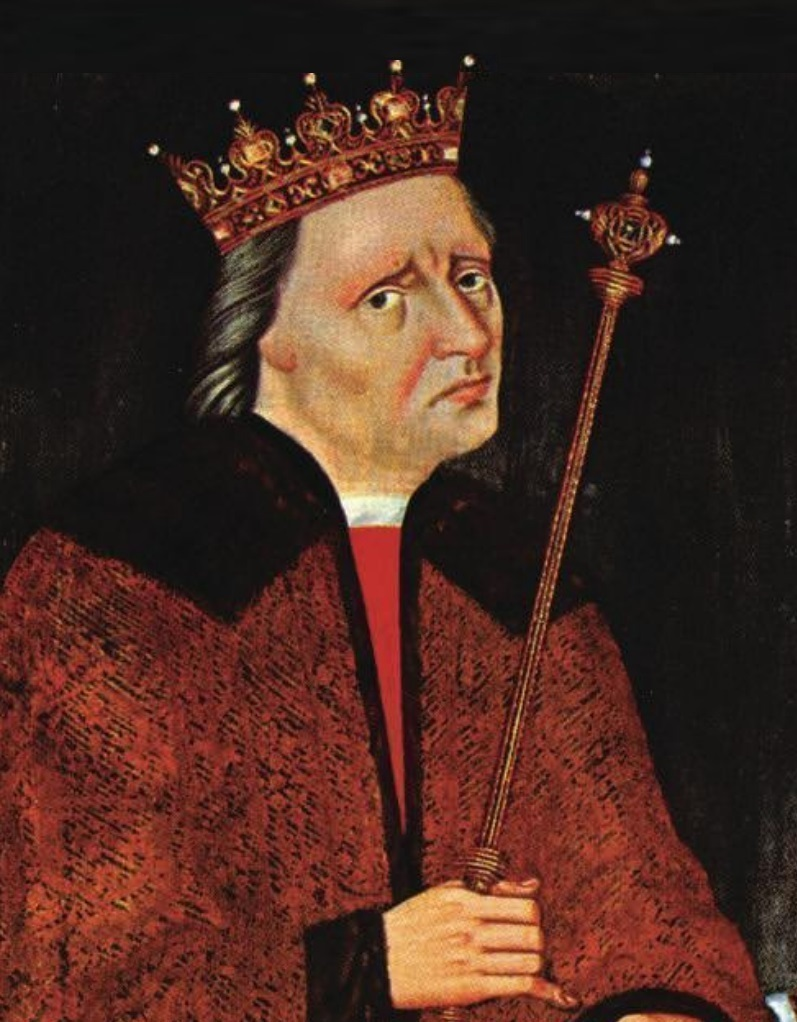
Christian I of Denmark, Norway, and Sweden

== Background ==
In 1463, when Christian I, the king of the Kalmar Union, implemented new taxes in Sweden called a "ship's tax", with the tax increasing everyones burdens by 12 öre for every peasant and 6 öre for all people on the countryside, anger quickly rose in most of Sweden, mostly in Uppland. The Archbishop, Jöns Bengtsson Oxenstierna, who also acted as the king's deputy, attempted to mediate between the two parties, however; he lacked military power after a large group of 3–4,000 angered peasants marched outside of Stockholm's castle.

Because of his lack of military power, Jöns was forced to promise the peasants that the tax was abolished. He took full responsibility for his actions and the peasants returned home back to their farms.

After Christian I received word of what Jöns had done, he realized that he had been given a reason to get rid of Jöns who had rebelled and deposed a former Swedish king only a few years prior. On August 10, after having sailed from Åbo to Stockholm, Christian confronted Jöns during a meeting of the Riksdag. After four days of arguing, the king, with the support of the council, imprisoned Jöns and took him to Denmark.

=== Peasant march to Stockholm ===
After Jöns had been imprisoned, Christian reinstated the tax once more, causing the peasants to rise up. Local royal servants were assaulted by the peasants and soon after the peasants with a force of around 3–4,000 were once again on a march towards Stockholm to threaten the king to lower the tax burdens. In the night between August 19 and 20, the peasants occupied Norrmalm and continued marching towards Helgeandsholmen.

Christian, who was at Almare-Stäket, was unaware of the danger; however, when the peasants tried to cross from Helgeandsholmen to Stadsholmen, local guards rang the church bells and Stockholm's burghers were awakened. An urgent warning was sent to Christian, who quickly sent his knights to respond.

== Massacre ==
The king reached Stockholm on August 20 and ordered an attack on the peasants to take place the next day. Helgeandsholmen constituted open terrain that had minimal escape possibilities for the peasants.

=== Attack ===
Quickly after the Danish attack begun, the peasants were overwhelmed by the more experienced troops under Ture Turesson Bielke, and for the most part, after a long period of fighting, most of the peasants had been killed by the Danes. Around 30 of the peasants took refuge inside of Helgeand church. In the Sture Chronicle, it is said that even after the peasants begged for mercy and put their weapons down in exchange for a promise of pardon, were still cut down by Ture Turesson's men. Turesson is said to have been the most merciless, with the Sture Chronicle referring to his behavior in the following words:

"Herr Ture Turesson, en ridder långer, / kallas då allmogsens köttmånger."

— Sture Chronicle

Rough translation:

Sir Ture Turesson, a long knight, / is called the butcher of the common folk

— Sture Chronicle

== Aftermath ==
According to one estimate, around 60 peasants were killed before their resistance was quelled, with another estimate putting the number as high as 1,000. The surviving peasants were forced to accept the new tax and swear allegiance to Christian, with these promises of allegiance likely being made as a result of torture.
