= Haraker =

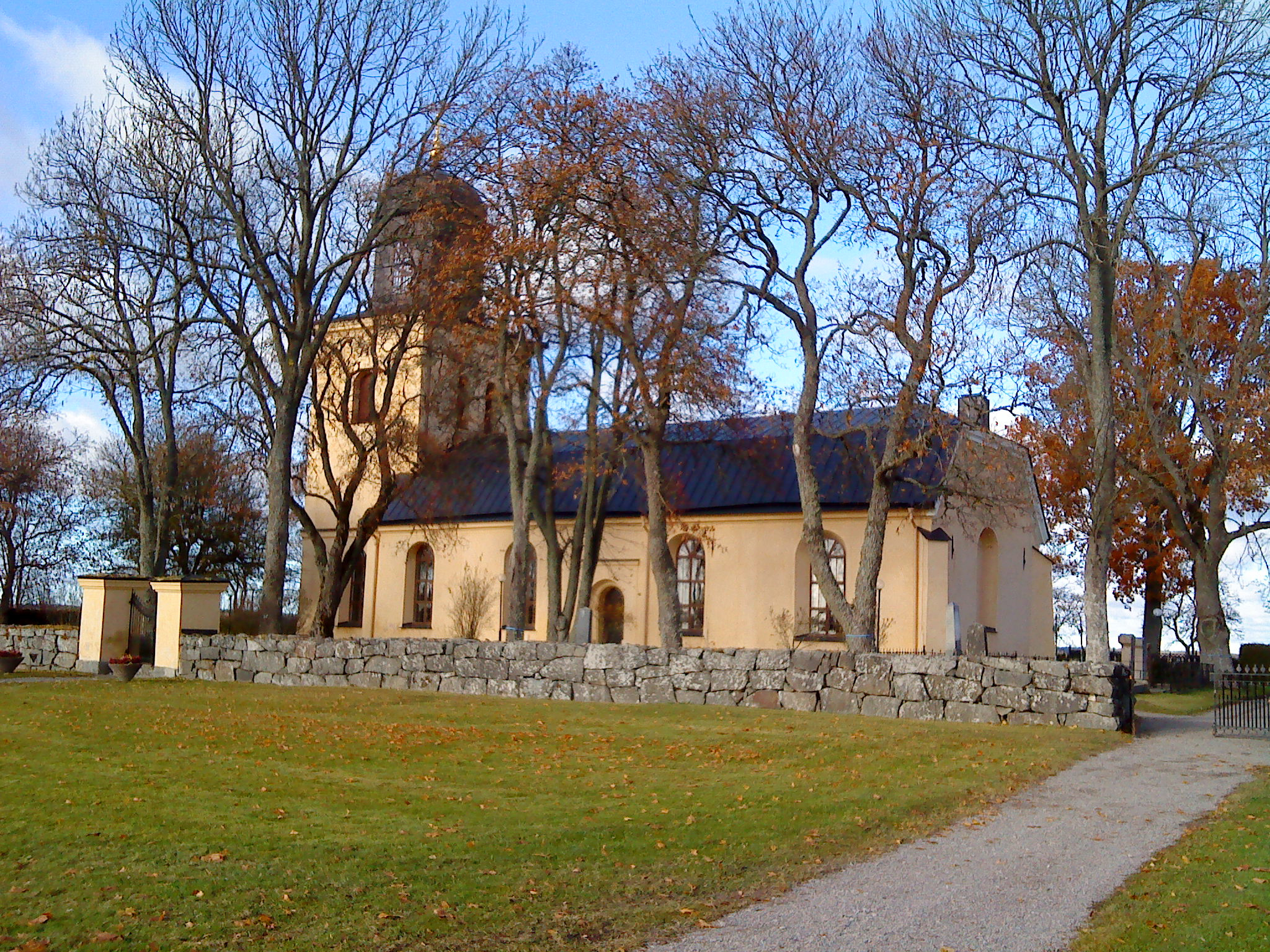
- Haraker Church

- Location within Västmanland Location within Sweden
- Coordinates: 59°46′23″N 16°27′43″E
- Country: Sweden
- Province: Västmanland
- County: Västmanland County
- Municipality: Västerås Municipality

Population (31 December 2010)
  - Total: 59
- Time zone: UTC+1 (CET)
  - Summer (DST): UTC+2 (CEST)

Haraker is a locality in central Sweden and the historical church village of Haraker Civil Parish in Västerås Municipality, Västmanland County. The locality is situated east of River Svartån, approximately 20 kilometers north of the city of Västerås, and had 59 registered inhabitants in 2010.

Haraker Church was originally built in the 14th century. The outskirts of the forest north of Haraker was the site of two major battles during the Kalmar Union era in the 15th century; the Battle of Hällaskogen in 1437 and the Battle of Haraker in 1464.
