= Västerås Castle =

Castle in Sweden

Coordinates: 59°36′23″N 16°32′40″E

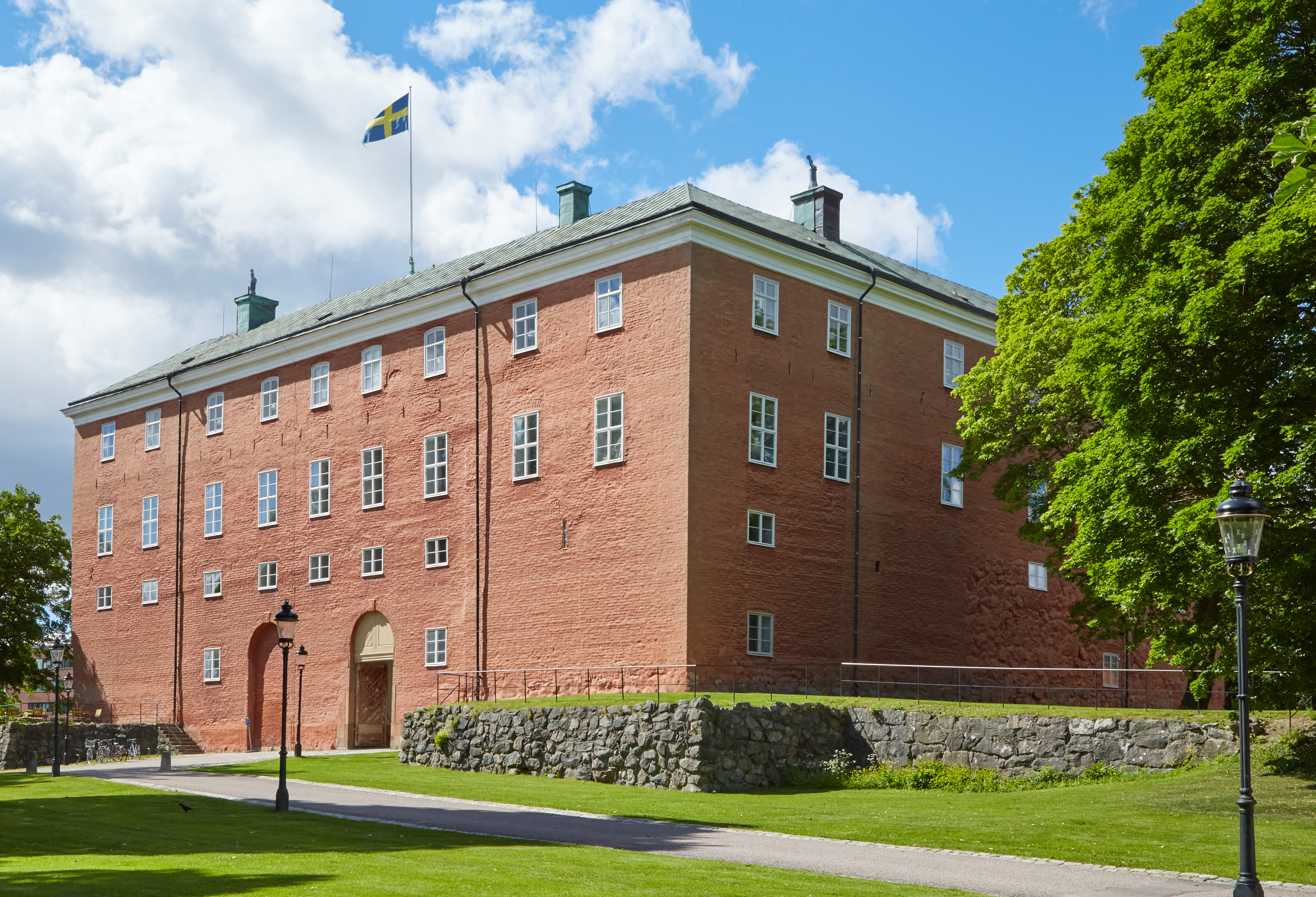
Västerås slott

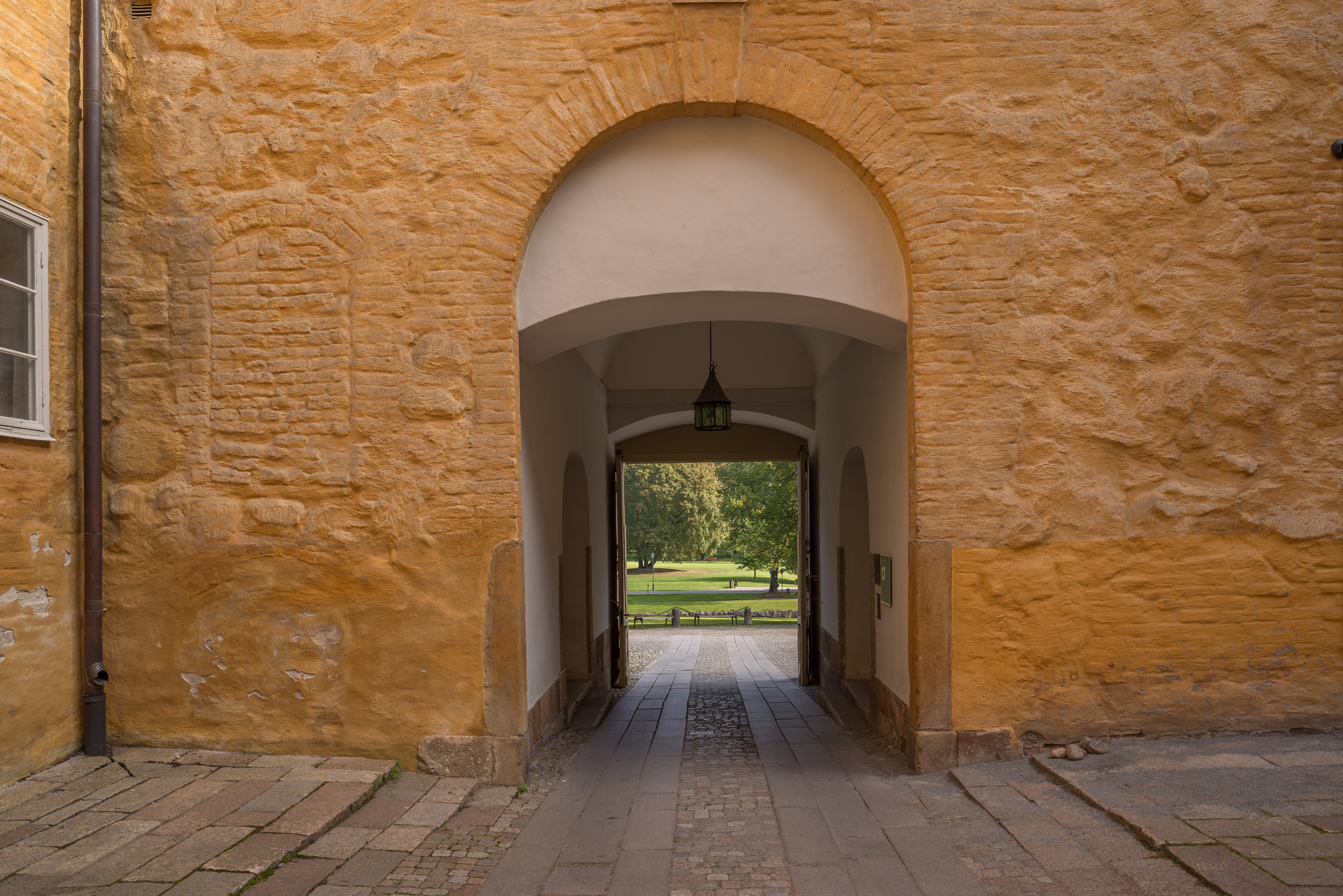
Entrance to Västerås slott

Västerås Castle (Västerås slott) is situated at Västerås in the province of Västmanland, Sweden.

== History ==
The castle was originally built during the 12th century and in 1540-1544 it was rebuilt. During the latter part of the 17th century, renovation work began under the direction of architect Mathias Spieler (ca. 1640–1691). In 1736, the castle was ravaged by fire. The castle was repaired and expanded in the mid-1740s with Carl Hårleman (1700–1753) as architect, and was completed in the 1750s. During the 1920s, restoration was carried out led by Västerås city architect Erik Hahr. In 1961, the County Administrative Board moved to a newly built country house which was renovated in 1965–66.

== Other sources ==
- Hedlund, Ruth (1990) Västerås slott: fogdeborg, kungaslott, fängelse och residens (Västerås: Västmanlands läns museum) ISBN 91-970290-3-3
