= Tranderup Parish =

Parish in Ærø Municipality, Denmark

Tranderup Parish Tranderup Sogn
- Parish
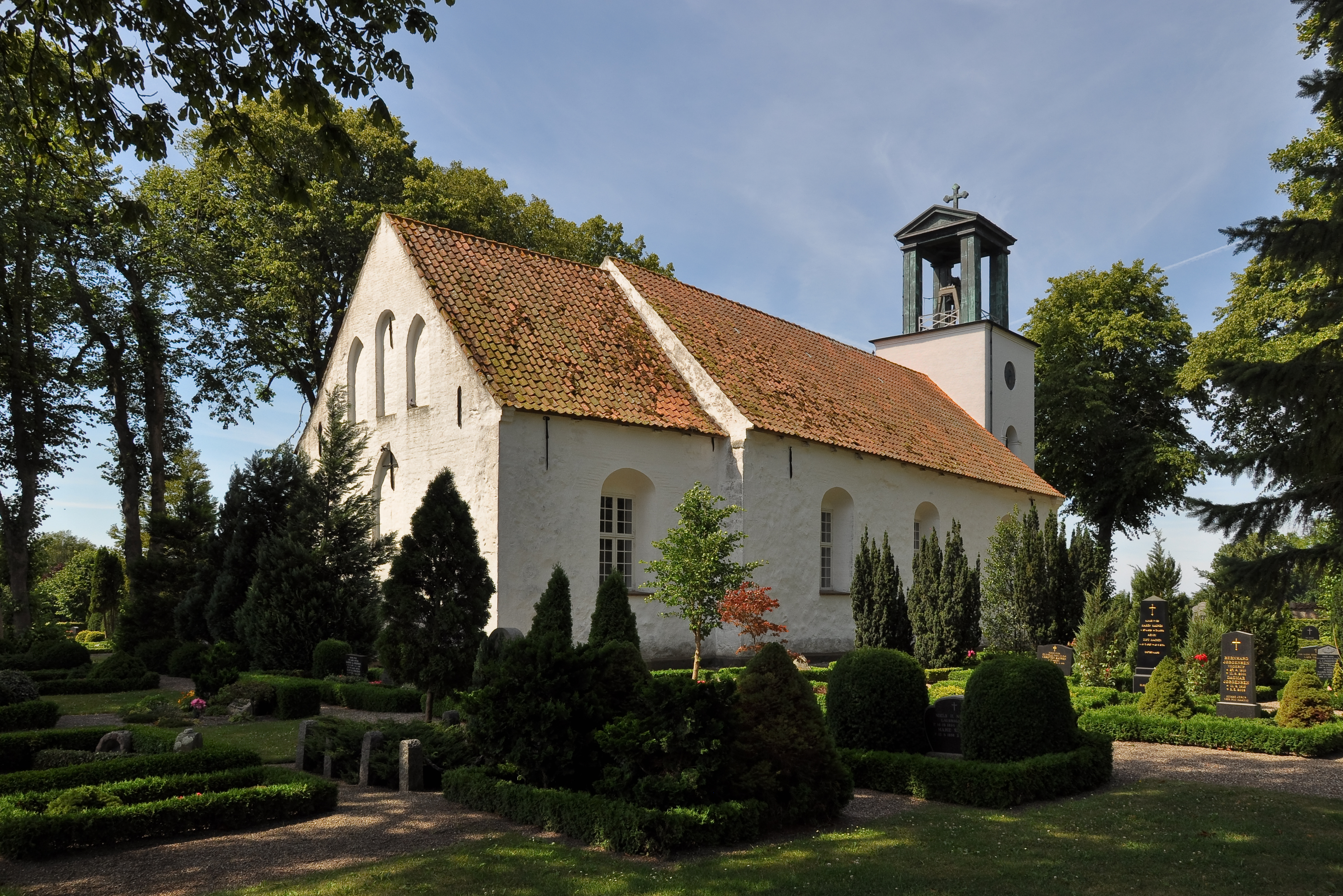
- Tranderup Church

- The parish within Ærø Municipality
- Coordinates: 54.8724°N 10.3573°E
- Country: Denmark
- Region: Southern Denmark
- Municipality: Ærø Municipality
- Diocese: Funen

Population (2025)
  - Total: 360
- Parish number: 7716

Tranderup Parish (Danish: Tranderup Sogn) is a parish in the Diocese of Funen in Ærø Municipality, Denmark.
