= Diarium Vadstenense =

The Diarium Vadstenense (also Diarium Vazstenense) or "Vadstena Diary" is the diary of the monks of the Vadstena Abbey (in Vadstena, Sweden), in which remarkable events in or out of the monastery were written down.

The diary contains notes from the years 1336–1545. Among the events in the abbey itself, the larger part concerns itself with persons who have entered the abbey as monks or nuns and the people who were interred in the abbey church. The diary is written in medieval Latin. The last note from 1545 mentions that the burghers of the town had begun to demolish the walls of the abbey.

The preserved diary is kept in the Uppsala University Library. The text has been published several times; the latest published version is the critical edition by Claes Gejrot from 1996, with a parallel translation in Swedish (Vadstenadiariet: latinsk text med översättning och kommentar, Stockholm: Samfundet för utgivande av handskrifter rörande Skandinaviens historia, 1996). An electronic version (on CD-ROM) of Gejrot's edition, with facsimiles of the original manuscript, was produced in 2003 for the 700th anniversary of the birth of Saint Bridget, the founder of the abbey and the Bridgettine Order.
