= Krummedige =

Krummedige is a surname. Notable people with the surname include:

- Hartvig Krummedige (c. 1400–1476), Danish nobleman
- Henrich Krummedige (c. 1464–1530), Danish-Norwegian nobleman
