= Kvicksund =

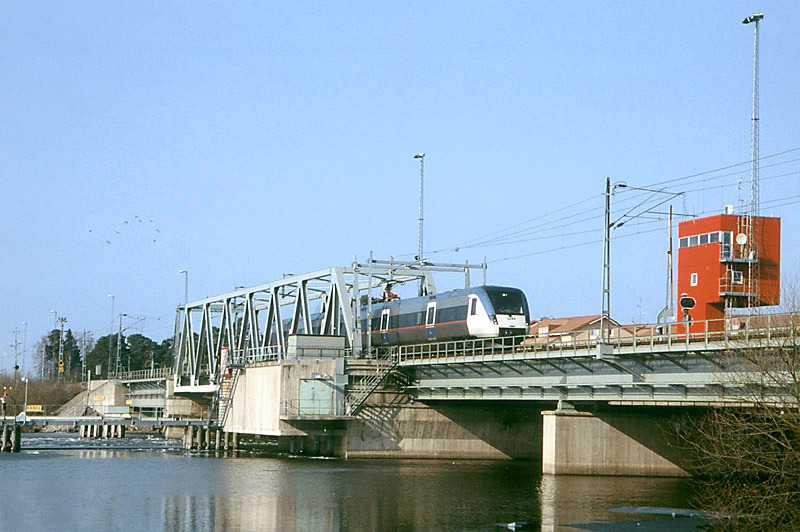
- X50 train crossing the Kvicksund bridge

- Location within Västmanland Location within Södermanland Location within Sweden
- Coordinates: 59°27′N 16°19′E
- Country: Sweden
- Province: Västmanland and Södermanland
- County: Västmanland County and Södermanland County
- Municipality: Västerås Municipality and Eskilstuna Municipality

Area
  - Total: 3.11 km^{2} (1.20 sq mi)

Population (31 December 2010)
  - Total: 1,768
  - Density: 568/km^{2} (1,470/sq mi)
- Time zone: UTC+1 (CET)
  - Summer (DST): UTC+2 (CEST)

Kvicksund (Swedish pronunciation: [kvɪkˈsɵnːd]) is a bimunicipal locality situated in Västerås Municipality, Västmanland County and Eskilstuna Municipality, Södermanland County in Sweden with 1,768 inhabitants in 2010. It is located on the shores of Lake Mälaren. Kvicksund is mainly situated in two different areas, one on the southern shore and one on the northern. The northern part is confined to the island of Nyckelön while the southern part is on the mainland.

Municipality	Population in Kvicksund	Other localities	Rural	Total	% of municipality population
Västerås	876	117,200	8,252	126,328	0.69
Eskilstuna	690	76,009	11,709	88,408	0.78
Total	1,566	193,209	19,961	214,736	0.73
