= Tre Kronor (castle) =

Castle in Stockholm, Sweden

Coordinates: 59°19′36″N 18°04′18″E

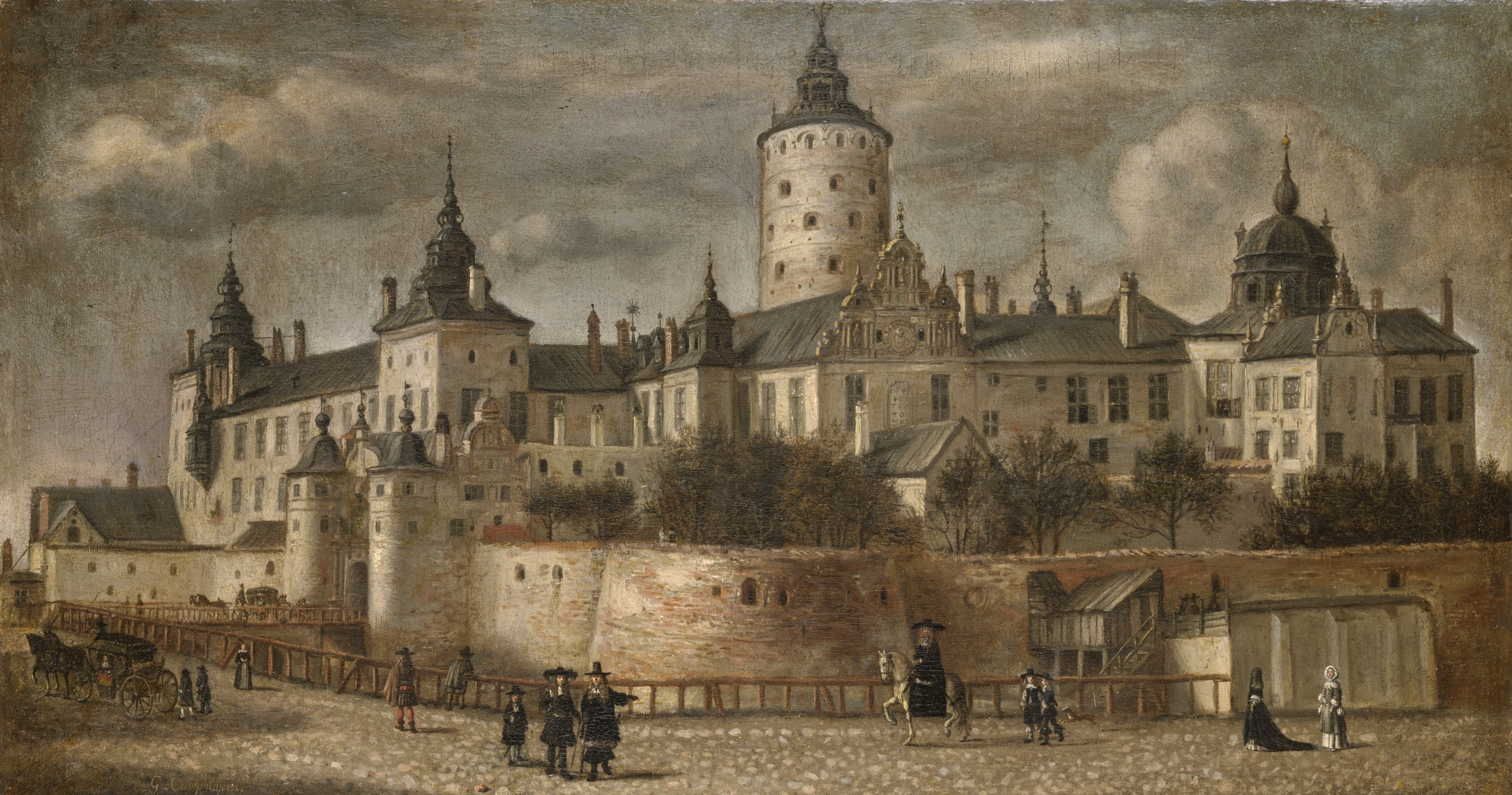
- The castle in a painting from 1661 by Govert Dircksz Camphuysen.
- Interactive map of the Tre Kronor area

General information
- Location: Stockholm, Sweden
- Construction started: 13th century
- Demolished: 1697 (fire)

Tre Kronor (Swedish pronunciation: [ˈtreː ˈkrûːnʊr] or [ˈtreː ˈkrûːnɛr]) or Three Crowns Castle was a castle located in Stockholm, Sweden, on the site where Stockholm Palace is today. It is believed to have been a citadel that Birger Jarl built into a royal castle in the middle of the 13th century. The name "Tre Kronor" is believed to have been given to the castle during the reign of King Magnus Eriksson in the middle of the 14th century.

Most of Sweden's national library and royal archives were destroyed when the castle burned down in 1697, making the country's early history unusually difficult to document.

== History ==
When King Gustav Vasa broke Sweden free from the Kalmar Union (a series of personal unions between Denmark, Sweden and Norway since 1397), Tre Kronor Castle became his most important royal seat. Gustav Vasa expanded the castle's defensive measures, while his son John III of Sweden later rebuilt and improved the castle aesthetically, turning it into a renaissance style castle and adding a castle church.

The keep may have existed previous to the 16th century, but in a much smaller form than that seen in pictures from the beginning and end of the 16th and 17th centuries. The tower was then about half the height at the end of the 16th century. The castle consisted of two parts, the main castle (högborgen) and the walled in gardens surrounding it (ekonomigården) with the high tower in the middle.

Gustavus Adolphus (1594–1632), also known in English as Gustav II Adolf or Gustav II Adolph was born in the castle. He was King of Sweden from 1611 to 1632.

=== The fire ===
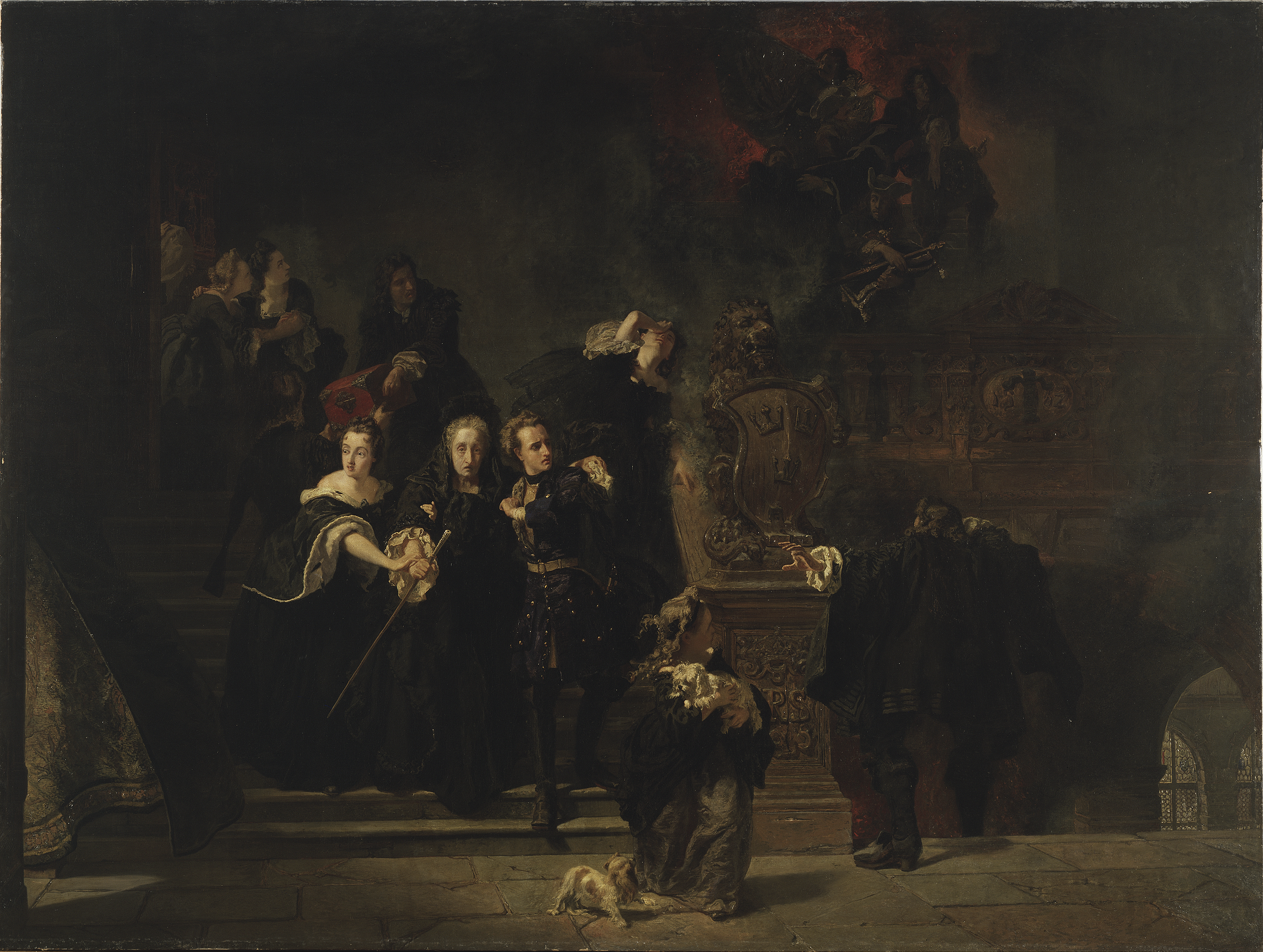
Johan Fredrik Höckert's realistic and dramatic painting from 1866 of the Castle Fire "Slottsbranden ... ", showing young King Charles XII of Sweden with his grandmother and sisters escaping ahead of his recently deceased father's body and his crown jewels coming down the stairs behind them.

On 7 May 1697 a large fire broke out in Tre Kronor that completely demolished the majority of the castle. The fire was discovered by the castle's keeper, Georg Stiernhoff. The fire marshal, Sven Lindberg, informed the royal staff that he could not get to the fire extinguishing equipment because the fire blocked his access to it. The royal family and court were forced to evacuate the castle. The servants attempted to save as much as possible of the royal possessions. The fire spread quickly to all parts of the castle. Since the castle was made out of wood and copper, the hot copper plates set the roof on fire. Due to the fire most of Sweden's national library and royal archives were destroyed.

Shortly after the fire died out, the investigation was launched into why it was not discovered earlier. A royal court found three possible culprits. Sven Lindberg – the fire marshal for the castle – and Anders Andersson and Mattias Hansson, soldiers on fire watch for the night, reporting to Sven Lindberg. It is revealed that Anders Andersson was running an errand for the fire marshal's wife, against fire watch regulations. Mattias Hansson had left his post, going into the kitchen to get some food. Hansson claimed that the fire marshal's wife had given permission to do so – a statement she denied.

The royal court concluded that the fire marshal had used the soldier for his and his wife's private errands. It was also found that he had accepted bribes in exchange for hiring people into certain positions at the castle. In February 1698 the sentences were handed out. Sven Lindberg and Mattias Hanson were sentenced to death since they had both neglected their duty. Anders Andersson was sentenced to run the gauntlet. The death sentences were both later commuted to running the gauntlet and six years of forced labour at Carlsten fortress. Lindberg died while running the gauntlet.

== Rebirth ==
Plans were made to rebuild a new castle on the old foundation. Nicodemus Tessin the Younger was the architect in charge of rebuilding. The new building, Stockholm Palace, was completed in 1754. Tessin died in 1728 and did not get to see it completed.

== Images ==
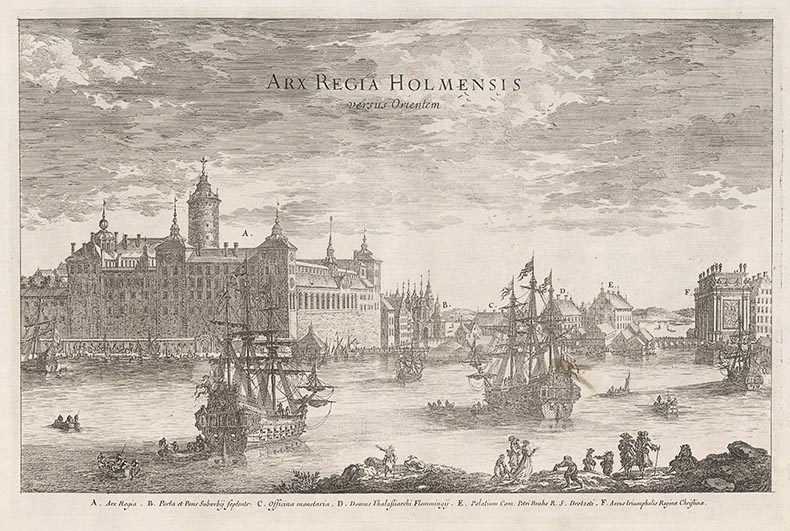
The castle, from Suecia Antiqua et Hodierna

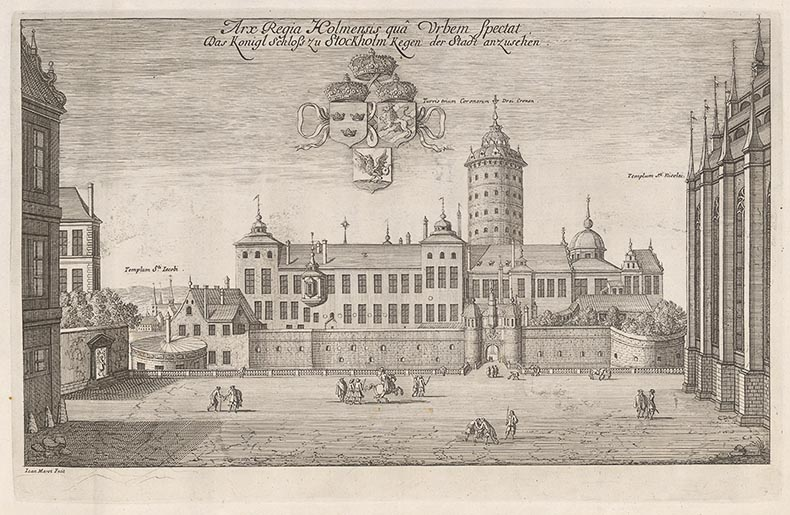
The castle, from Suecia Antiqua et Hodierna

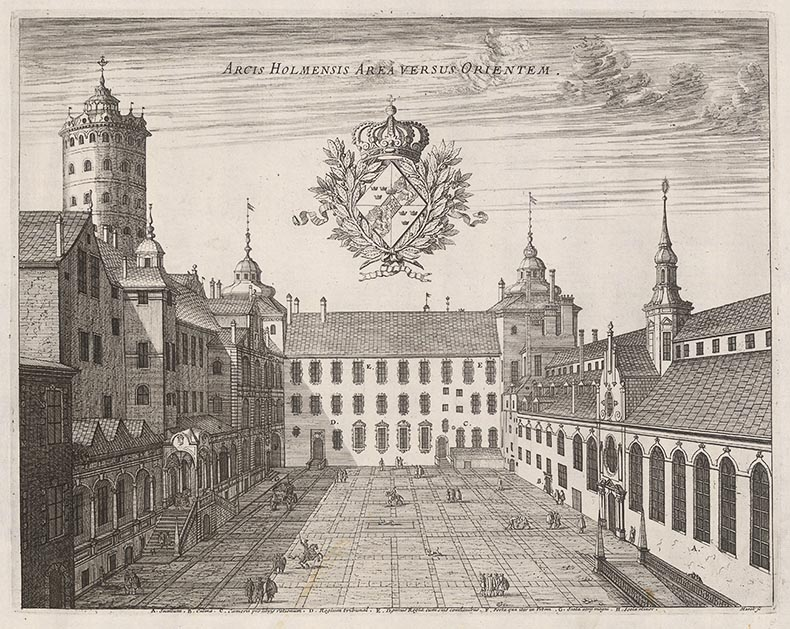
The castle, from Suecia Antiqua et Hodierna

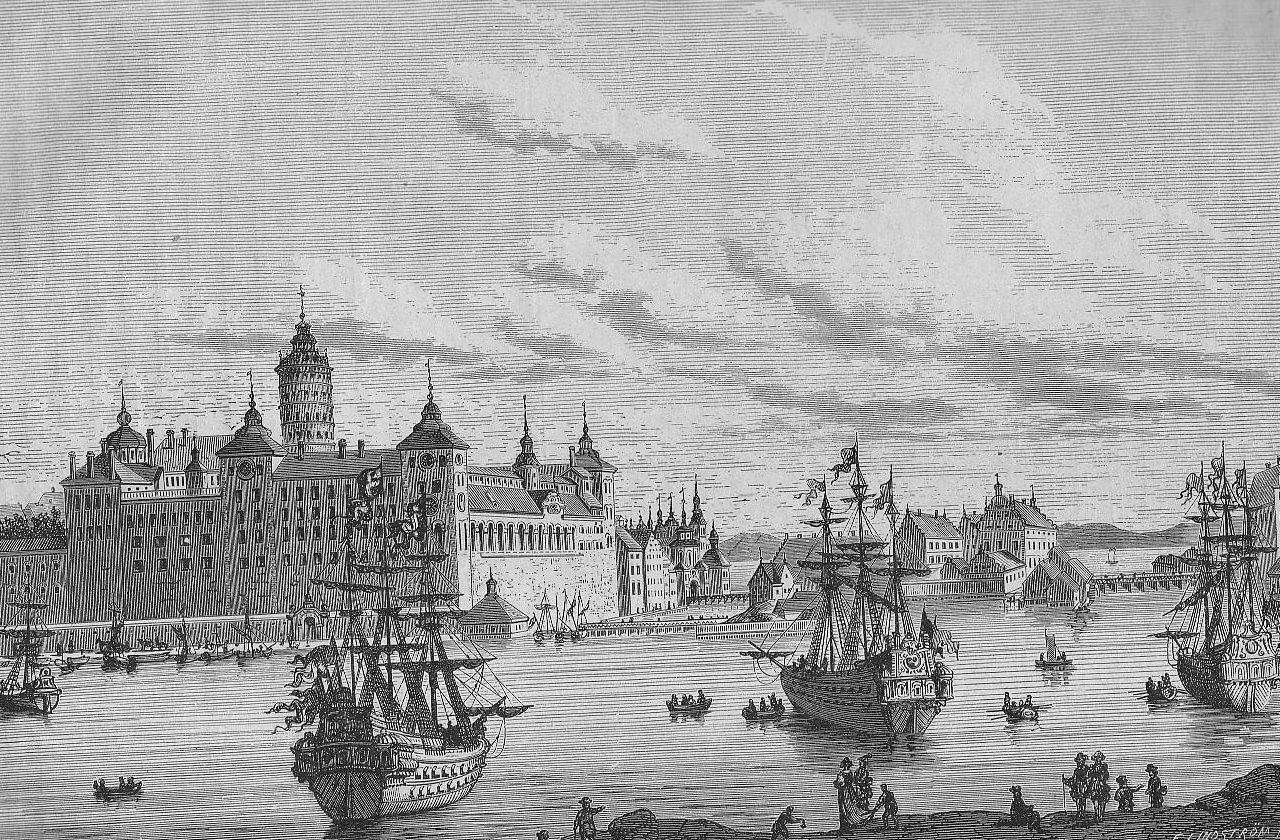
The castle in the 17th century, seen from the northeast

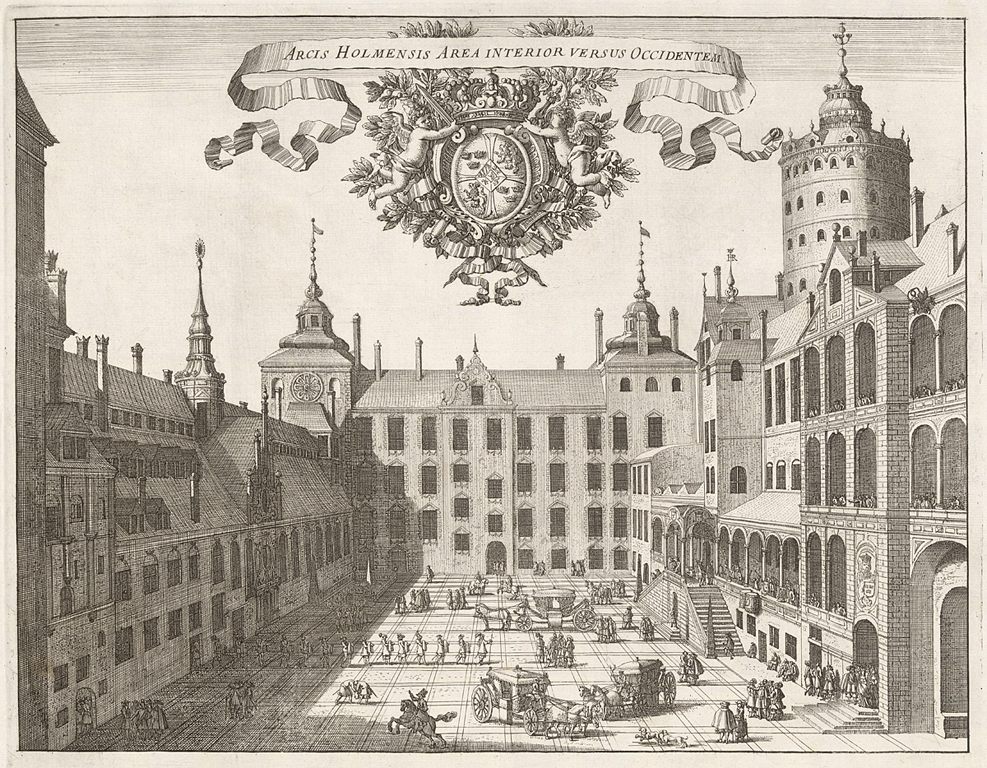
The Castle, the Grand Courtyard seen from the west

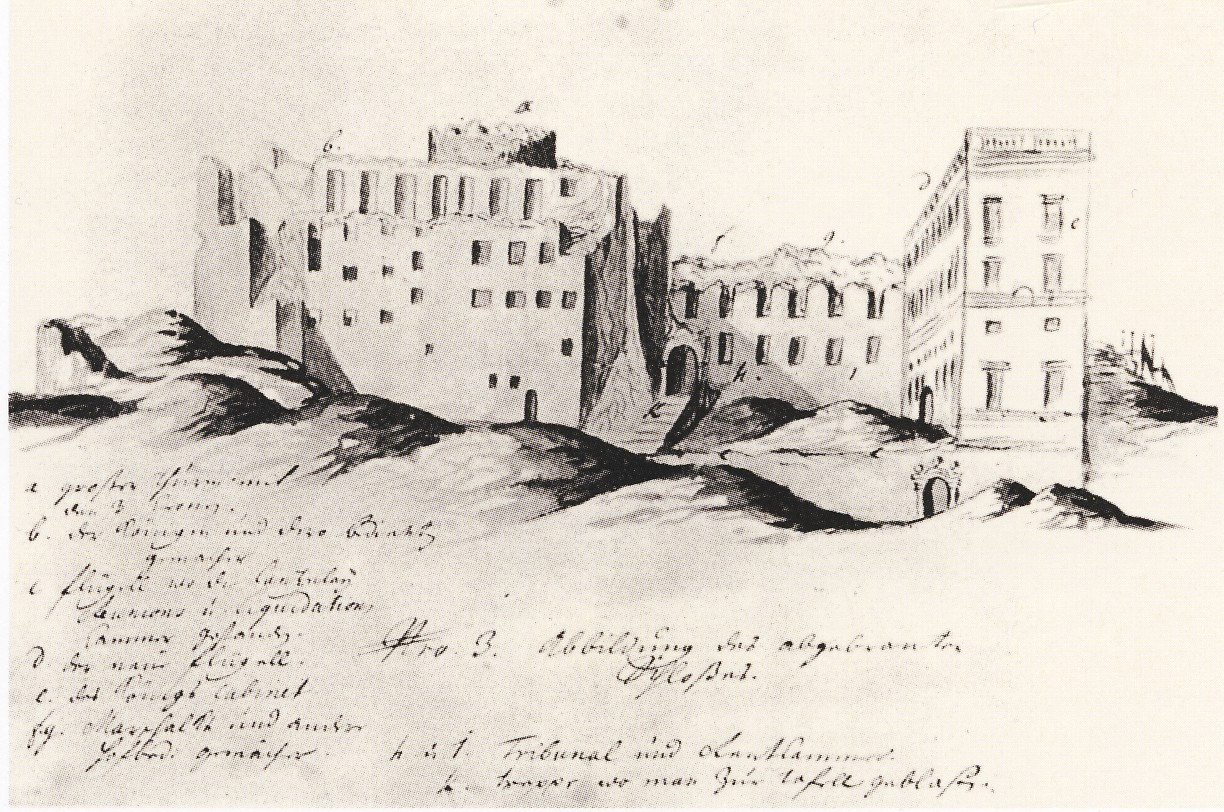
Castle after the fire

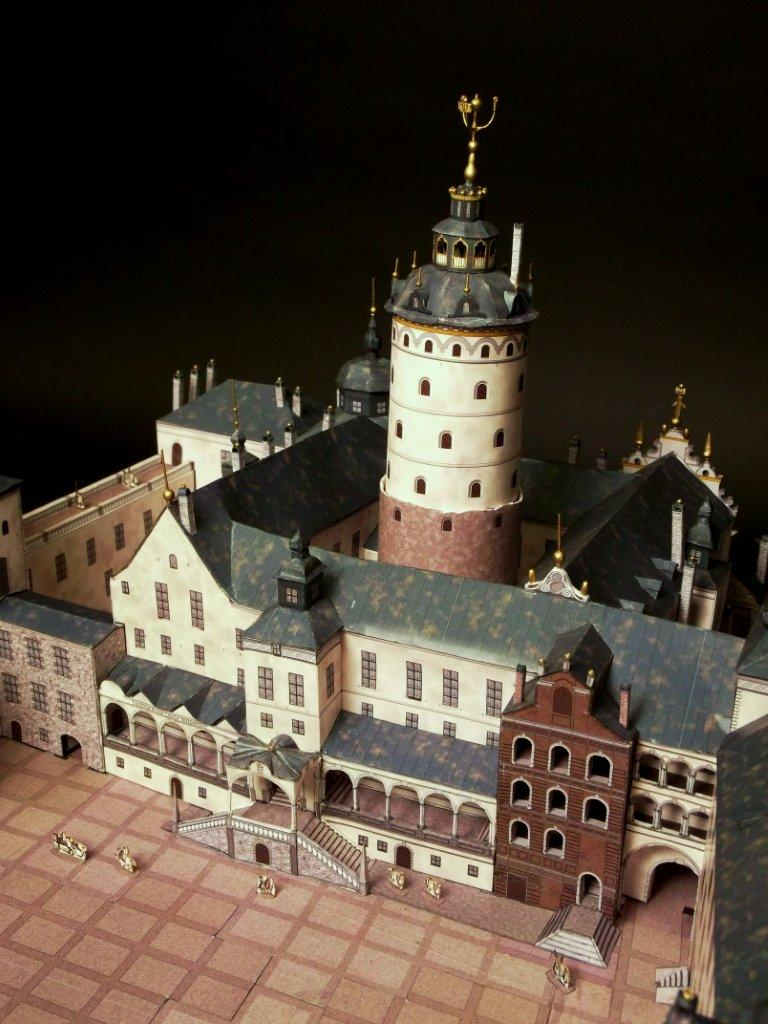
The Castle's Grand Courtyard

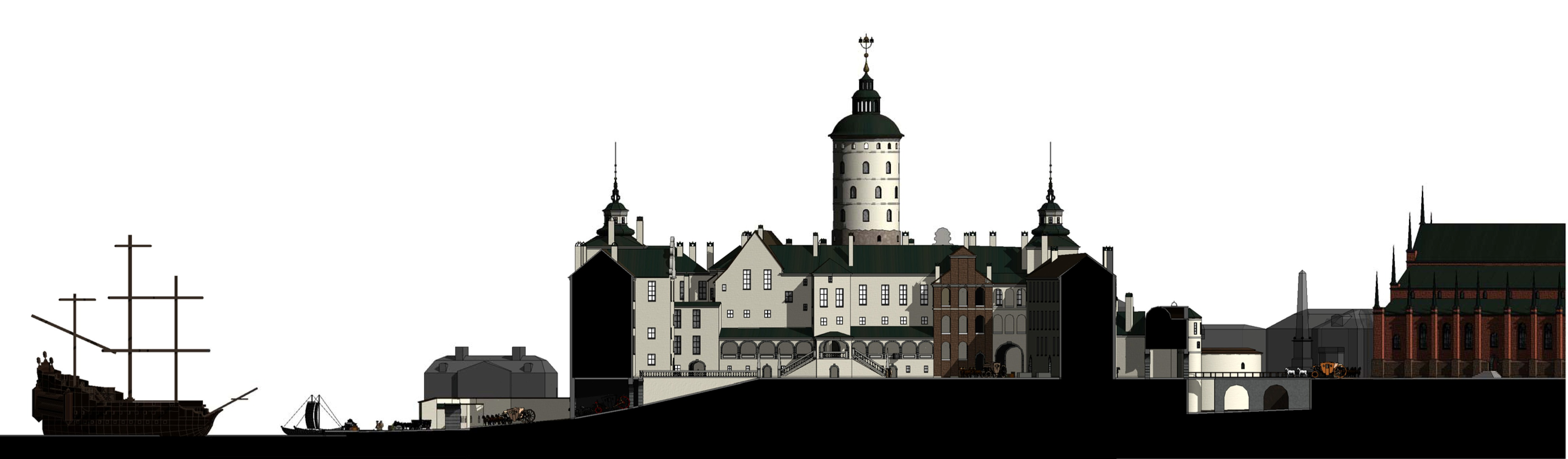
Cross-section of the castle

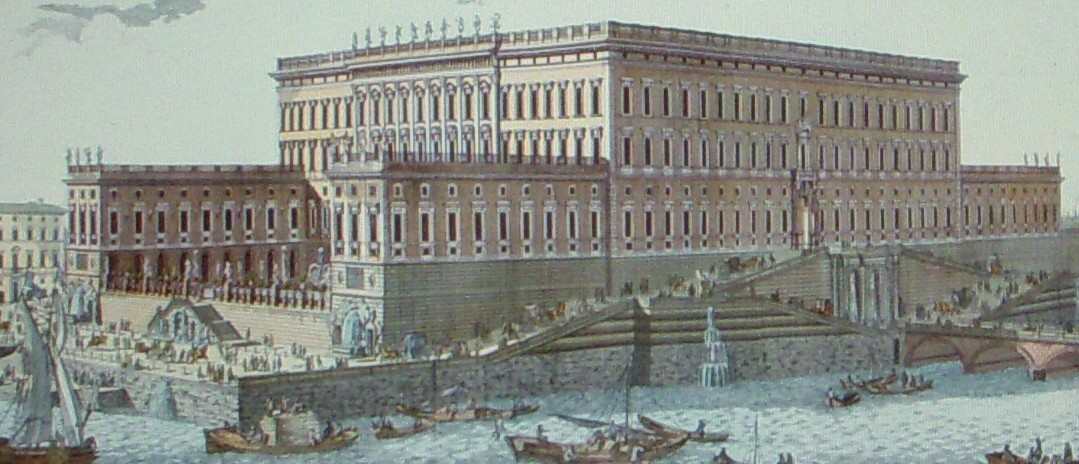
Stockholm Palace 1770

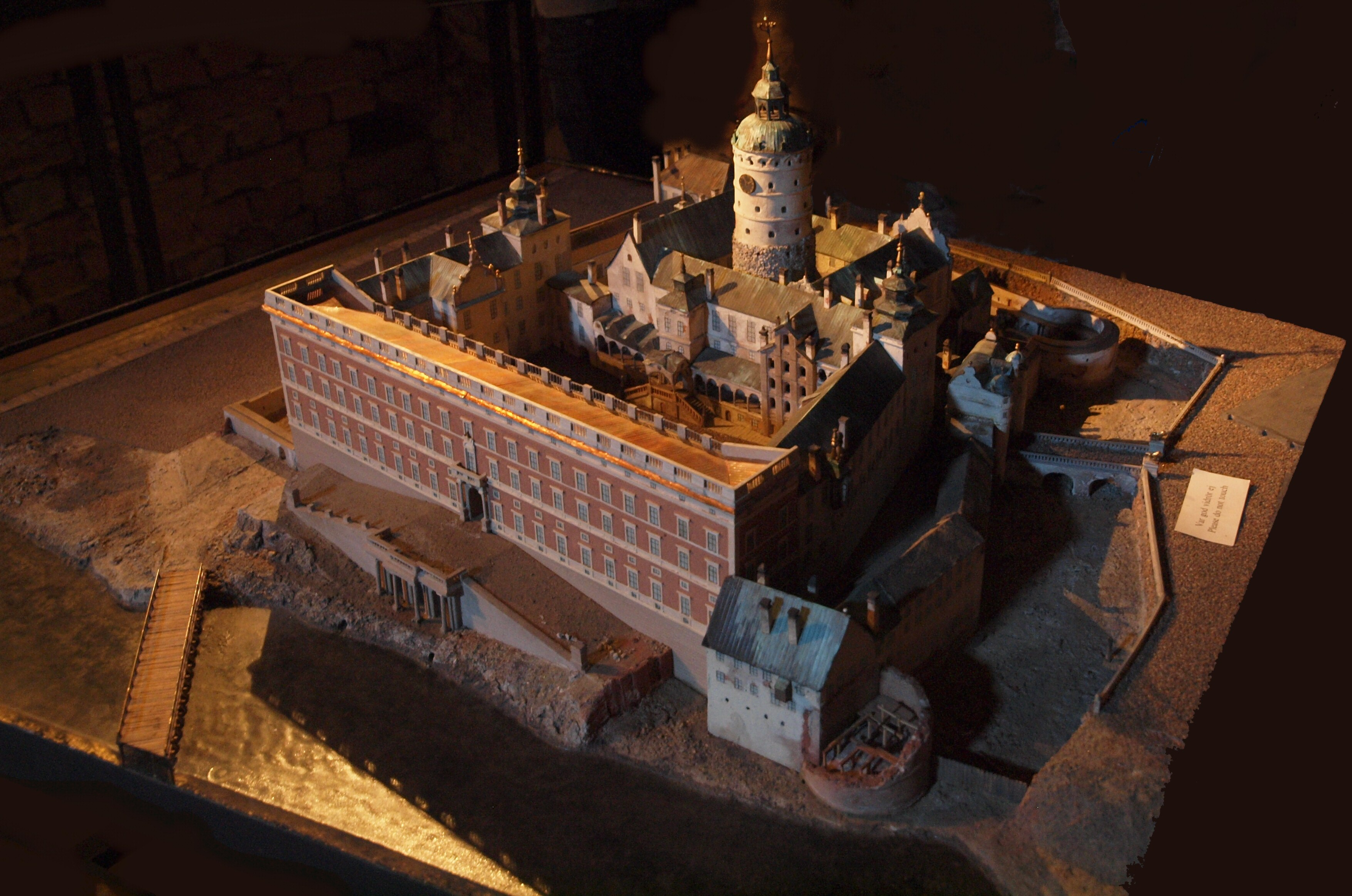
A small-scale model of the castle, as pictured in Museum Three Crowns

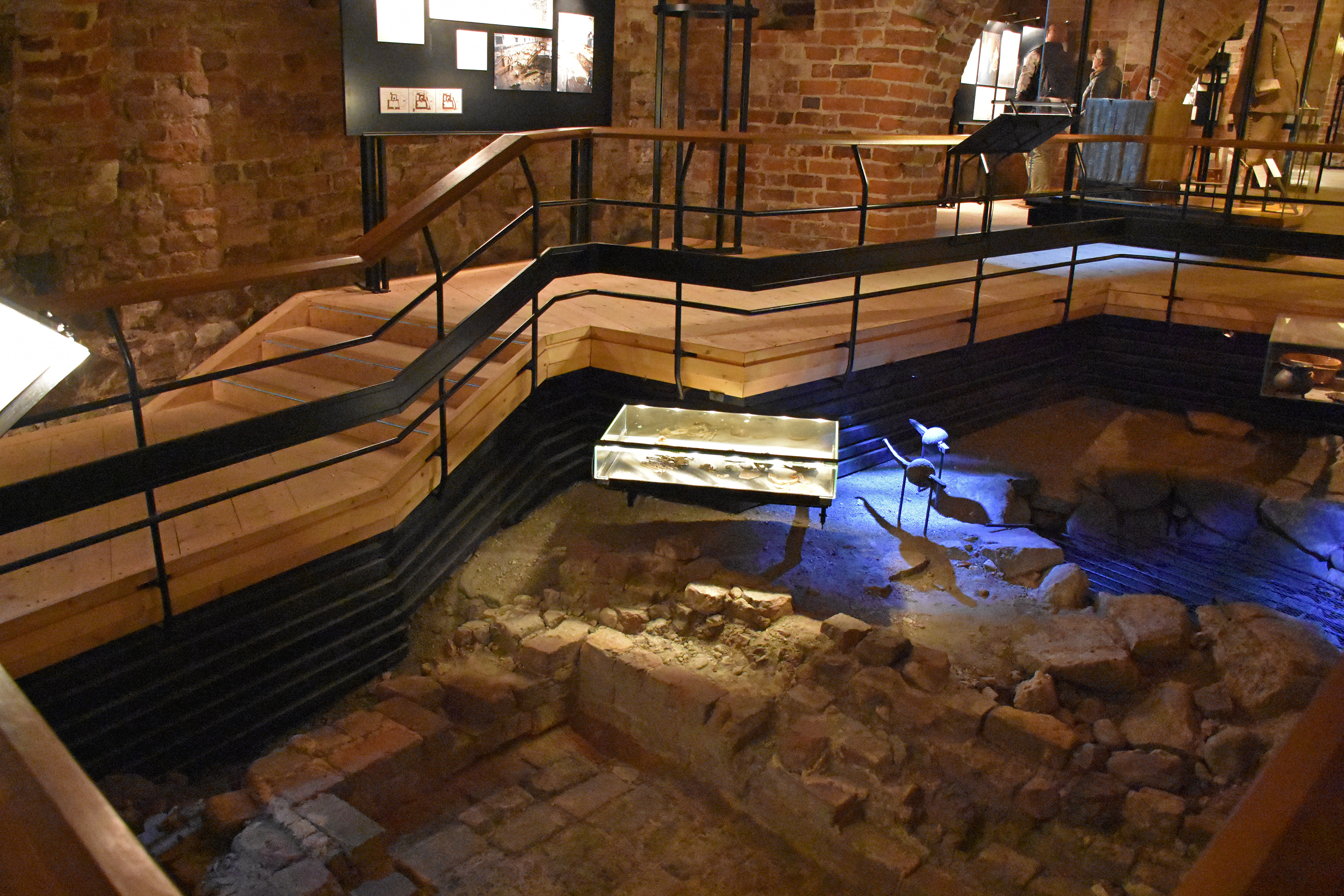
Remnants of the castle, as pictured in Museum Three Crowns

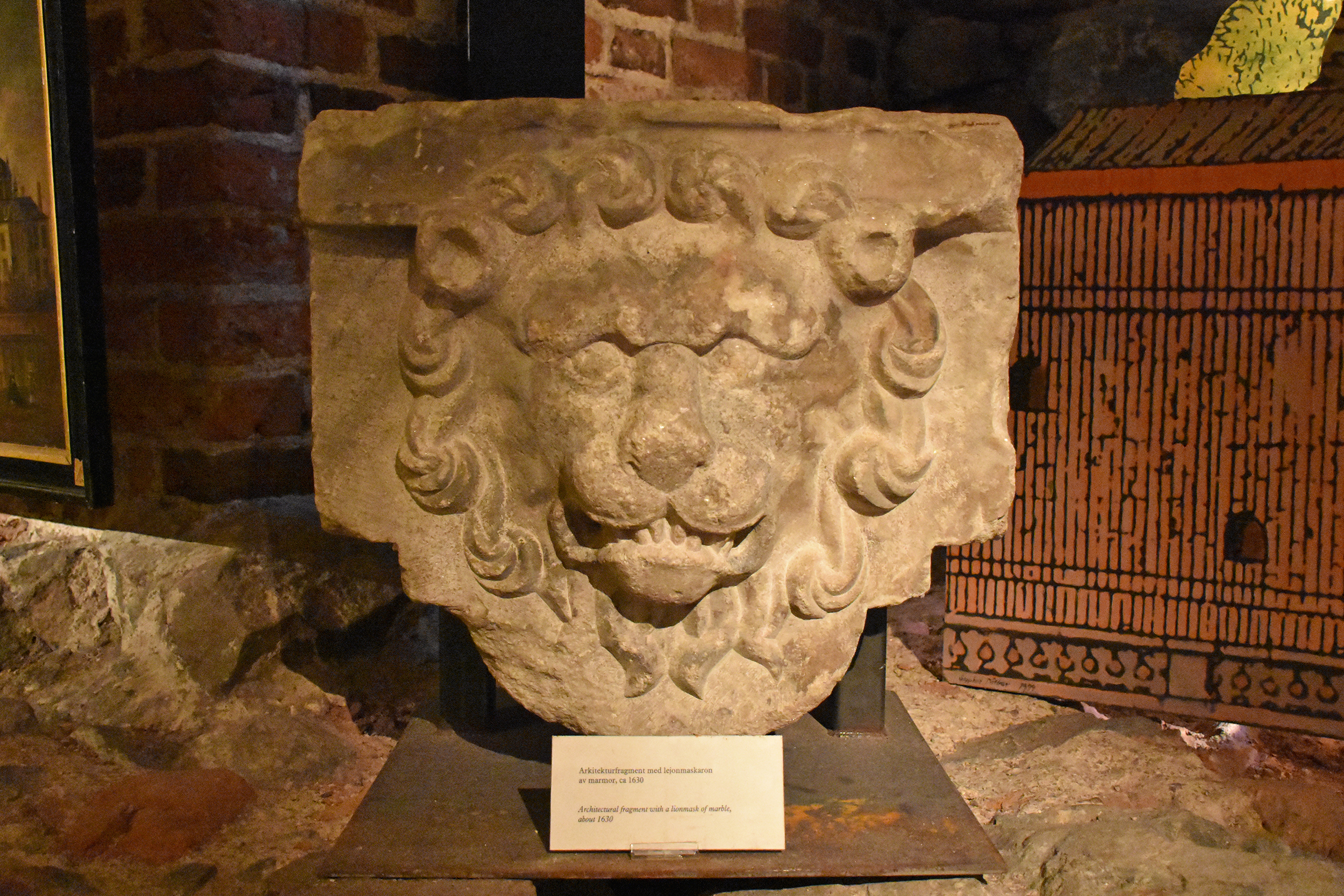
Marble castle fragment, as pictured in Museum Three Crowns

== Recreations ==
A 1/3rd scale replica of Tre Kronor was created as part of The General Art and Industrial Exposition of Stockholm (1897) (Swedish: Allmänna konst- och industriutställningen) also known as "Stockholm World's Fair" (Stockholmsutställningen).
