= Karlsdotter =

Karlsdotter is a Swedish patronymic name. People known by this name include the following:

- Anna Karlsdotter (died 1552), Swedish noble
- Catherine Karlsdotter, (died 1450), Swedish queen
- Magdalena Karlsdotter, known as Magdalena of Sweden (1445 – 1495), Swedish princess
- Brita-Kajsa Karlsdotter (1816–1915), Swedish textile artist

== See also ==
- Carlsdotter
- Karlsdóttir
