= Saint Bridget's Convent of Pax Mariae =

Roman Catholic convent of the Bridgettine Order

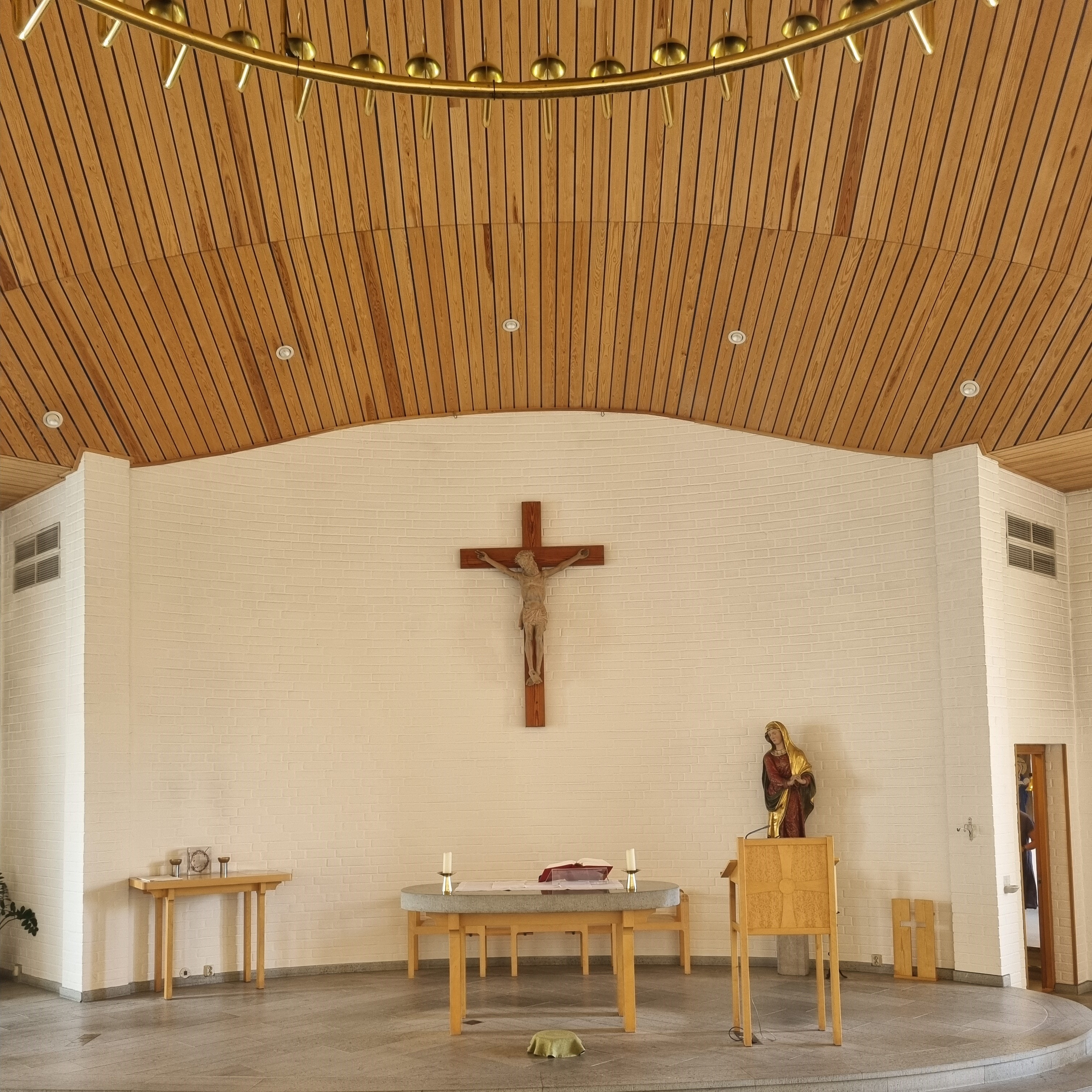
The chapel of Saint Bridget's Convent of Pax Mariae

Saint Bridget's Convent of Pax Mariae is a Roman Catholic convent of the Bridgettine Order established in 1963 in Vadstena, Sweden. It is dedicated to the Peace of Mary (Pax Mariæ). At present, the convent houses eleven Bridgettine nuns.

Saint Bridget's Convent of Pax Mariae is located near to the Evangelical-Lutheran Vadstena Abbey Church, which housed nuns of the Bridgettine Order until 1605, when the last Swedish Bridgettine nun of that time, Karin Johansdotter died. In 1935, Maria Elisabeth Hesselblad established Saint Bridget's Convent of Pax Mariae. In 1991, Saint Bridget's Convent of Pax Mariae was raised to the status of an autonomous abbey. The nuns of Saint Bridget's Convent of Pax Mariae pray the Divine Office daily and laity are able to join them. Saint Bridget's Convent of Pax Mariae is a place of Christian pilgrimage.

== Abbesses ==
- 1991–2016 : Karin Adolfsson
- 2016– : Jenny Maria Schaub

== Gallery ==
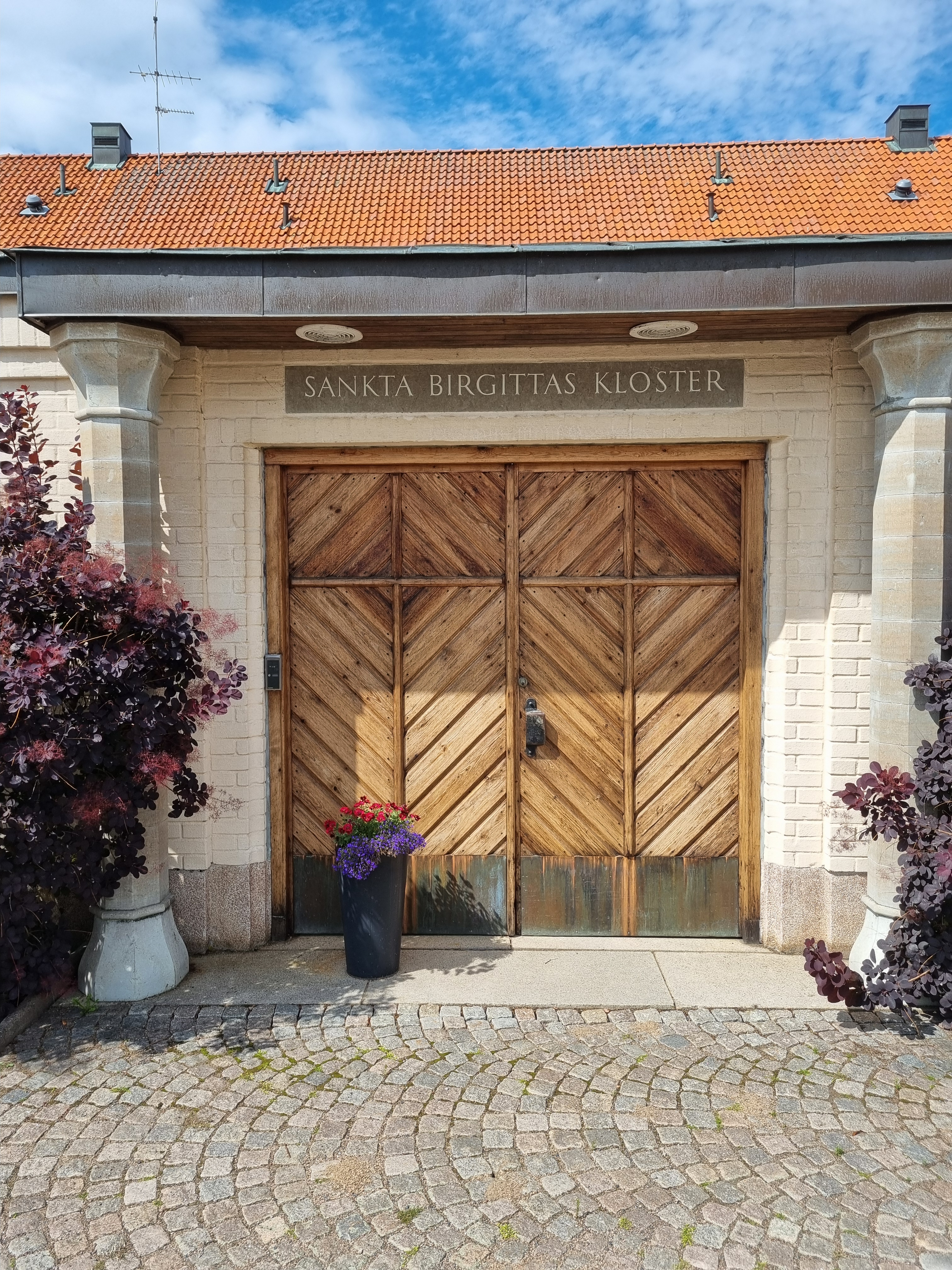
The entrance to Saint Bridget's Convent of Pax Mariae

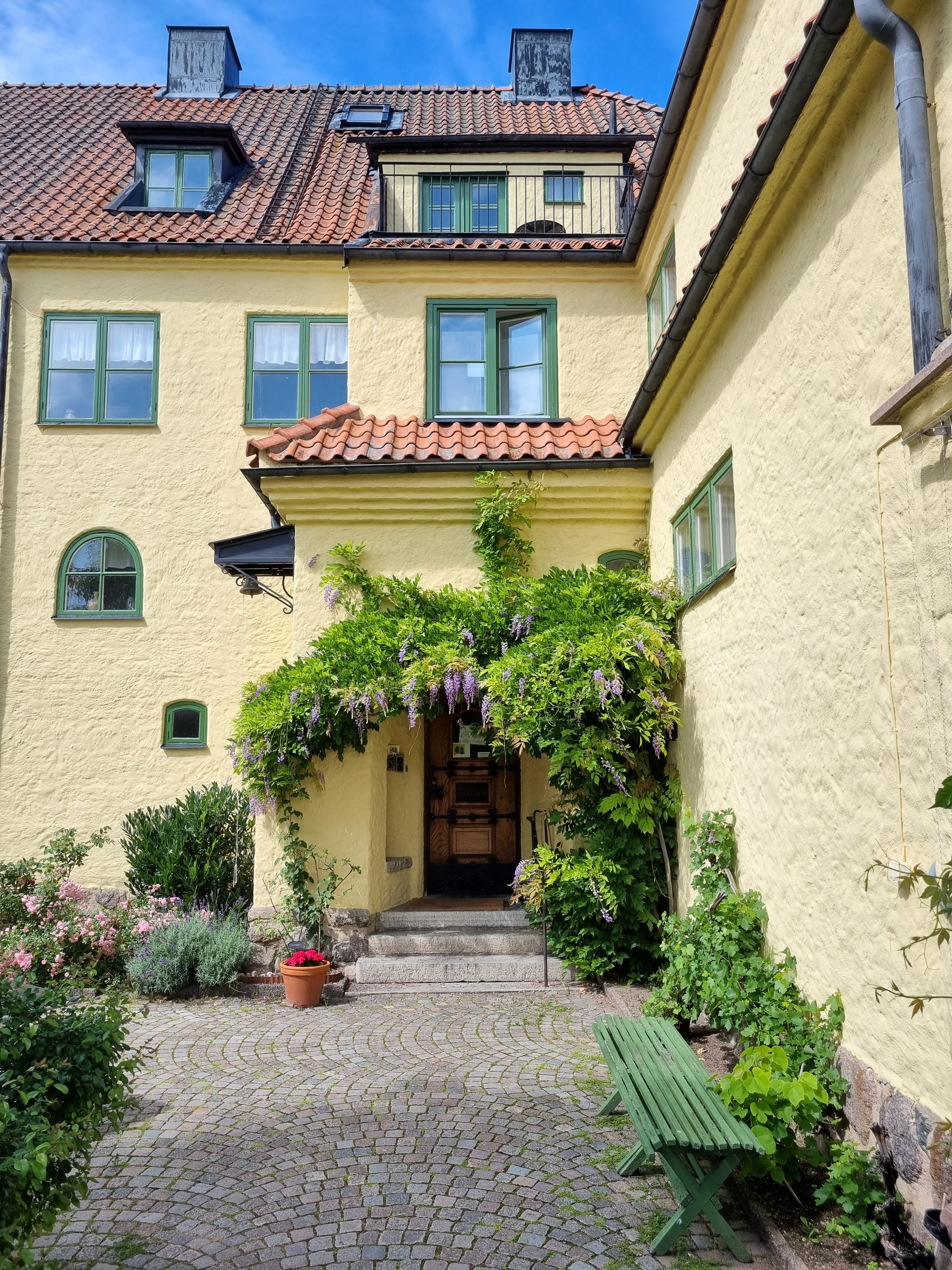
The guesthouse of Saint Bridget's Convent of Pax Mariae

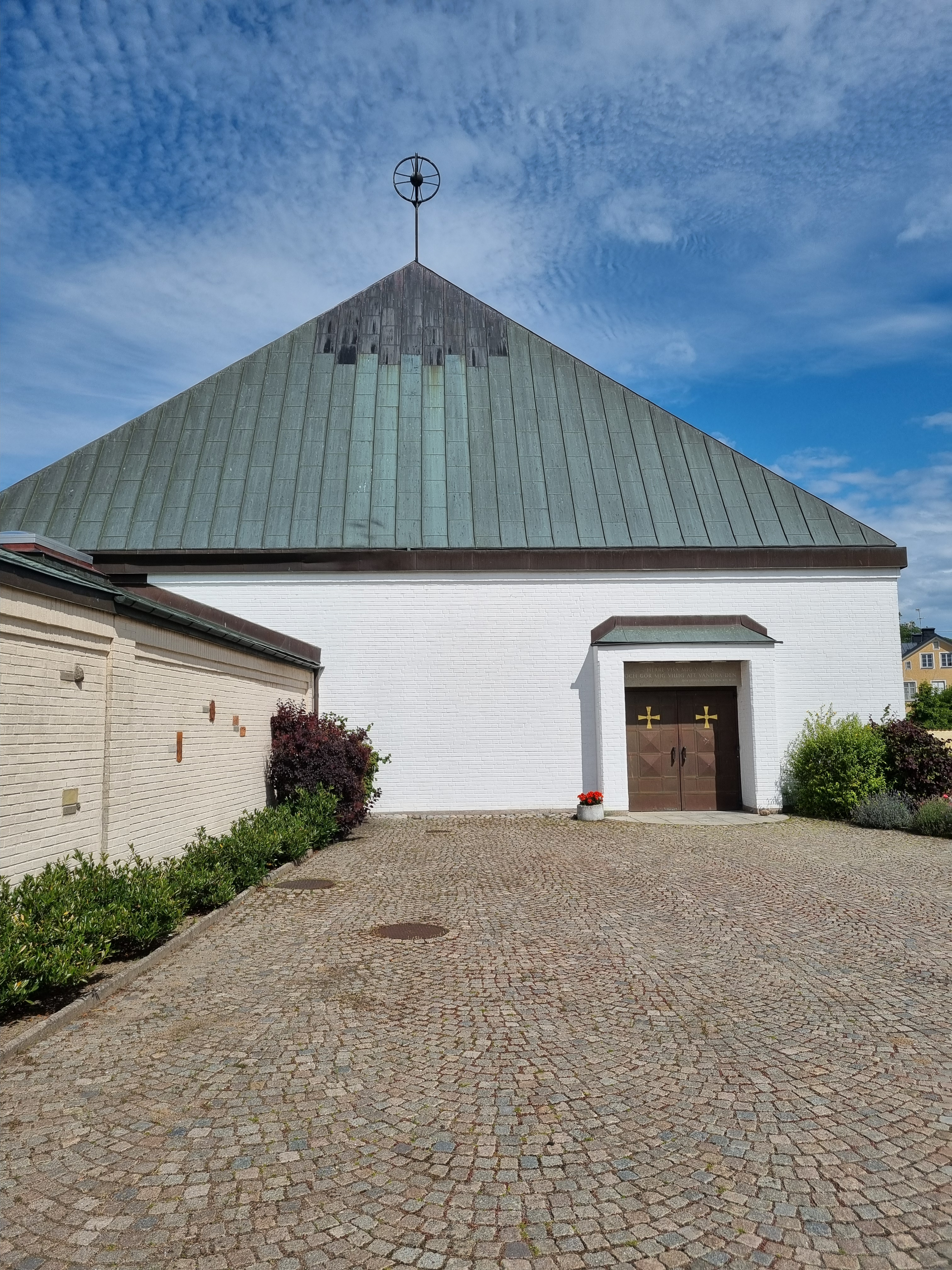
The exterior of the chapel of Saint Bridget's Convent of Pax Mariae

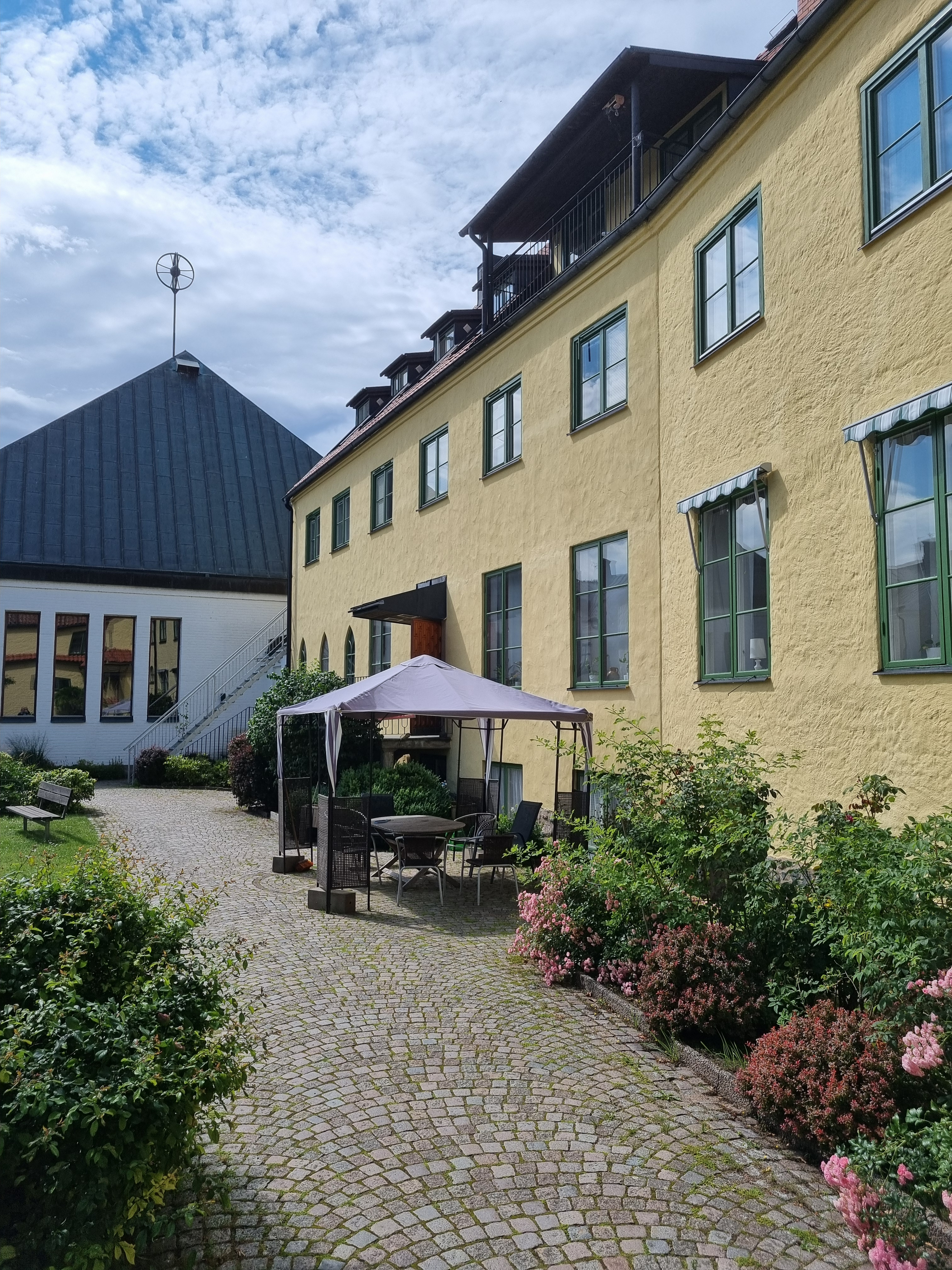
The Saint Bridget's Convent of Pax Mariae guesthouse garden

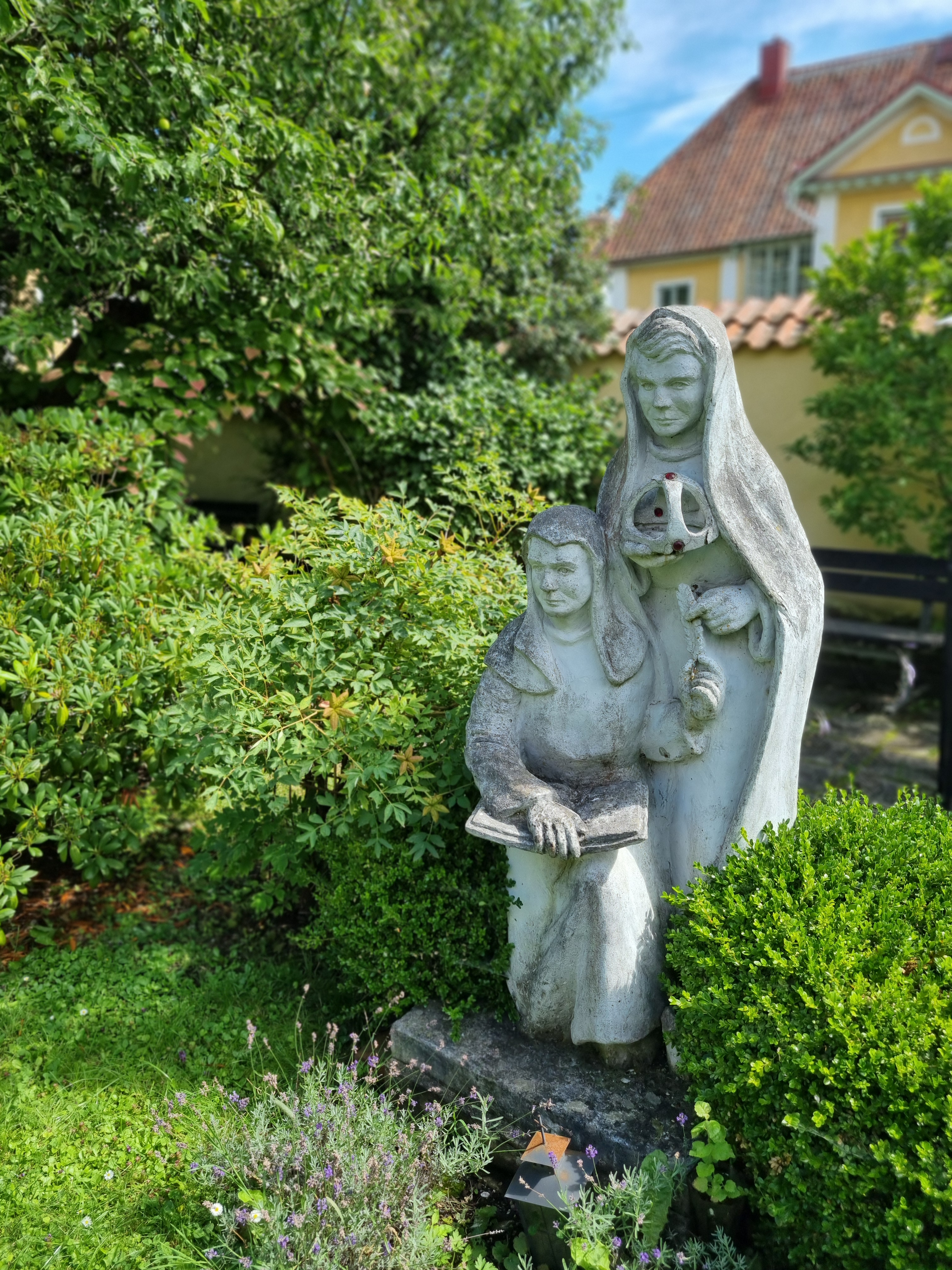
Statue of two Bridgettine nuns in the guesthouse garden

== See also ==
- Sisters of the Holy Spirit at Alsike Convent
