= Magdalen of Sweden (disambiguation) =

Magdalen of Sweden - Swedish: Magdalena and Madeleine - may refer to:

- Magdalen of Sweden, Swedish princess 1448
- Madeleine (legal spelling), Swedish princess 1982
- Sophia Magdalen, Queen consort of Sweden 1771
