= Katarina Gylta =

Katarina Bengtsdotter Gylta, in Latin: Catharina Benedicta (1520 – 3 June 1593), was a Swedish nun of the Bridgettine Order, Abbess of Vadstena Abbey in 1553–1564 and 1565–1593. She was the second last abbess in Sweden and Vadstena Abbey after the reformation.

== Life ==
Katarina Bengtsdotter Gylta was the daughter of riksråd and nobleman Benkt Pedersson Gylta (d. 1520) and Brita Bengtsdotter Lillie (d.1560) and the sister of riksråd Bengt Gylta (1514–1574) and the historian Jöran Gylta. Her paternal aunt and her paternal grandfather were both members of Vadstena Abbey. Katarina Bengtsdotter Gylta was described as well educated and could speak Latin as well as Swedish.

=== Early tenure ===
She was elected abbess in 1553. She lost the position in 1564, but was elected for a second term already the year after, and after that, she kept the position until her death. Her period of office was longer than any other abbess before her, and also a turbulent period for the abbey. Vadstena Abbey had been allowed to remain after the reformation, but not without conflict. In 1555, the male section of the abbey was closed and the monks was ordered to leave. In 1567, the abbey was plundered by Danish soldiers during the Northern Seven Years' War. The year after, the number of nuns at Vadstena are counted as 18. The abbey was, however, still benefited by many private benefactors: in 1568, she received large donations from Queen Karin Månsdotter and Jöran Persson during the illness of Erik XIV of Sweden.

=== Reign of John III ===
During the reign of King John III of Sweden, the abbey was favored by the royal house and Katarina Bengtsdotter Gylta maintained a good relation to the King and the Queen, Catherine Jagellon. It is described how she used to talk to the King while they walked in the convents gardens, where he held her under the arm due to her infirmity. In 1575, the Vadstena Abbey was granted unlimited permission to receive novices again, which had been difficult since the reformation. In 1580, Gylta wrote to the Pope to ask for assistance, a letter which is still preserved. In the letter, she expressed her concern that there was at that time only one convent left in Sweden except for the Vadstena Abbey, that the nuns had been forced to do without the monks for thirty years and that there were only two Catholic priests left in the abbey, both crippled with age.

It is likely that it was due to the Queen that the Vadstena Abbey was visited by a cardinal of the Pope, Antonio Possevino, whom Gylta received later the same year. The abbey was during his visitation reformed according to the latest regulations of the Catholic Church, and Katarina Bengtsdotter Gylta and her prioress swore the Tridentian oath from 1564. In 1587, she hosted the monarch and Crown Prince Sigismund, and during their visit, the first great Catholic mass since the reformation was held. In 1592, a school for Catholic priests was founded in the abbey by Anders Magnusson.

She died, as it was said, full of concerns for the future of the abbey.

== See also ==
- Valborg Fleming
- Karin Johansdotter
