= Naval battle off Stockholm (1522) =

Failed 1522 Danish expedition to Stockholm

- Part of the Swedish War of Liberation
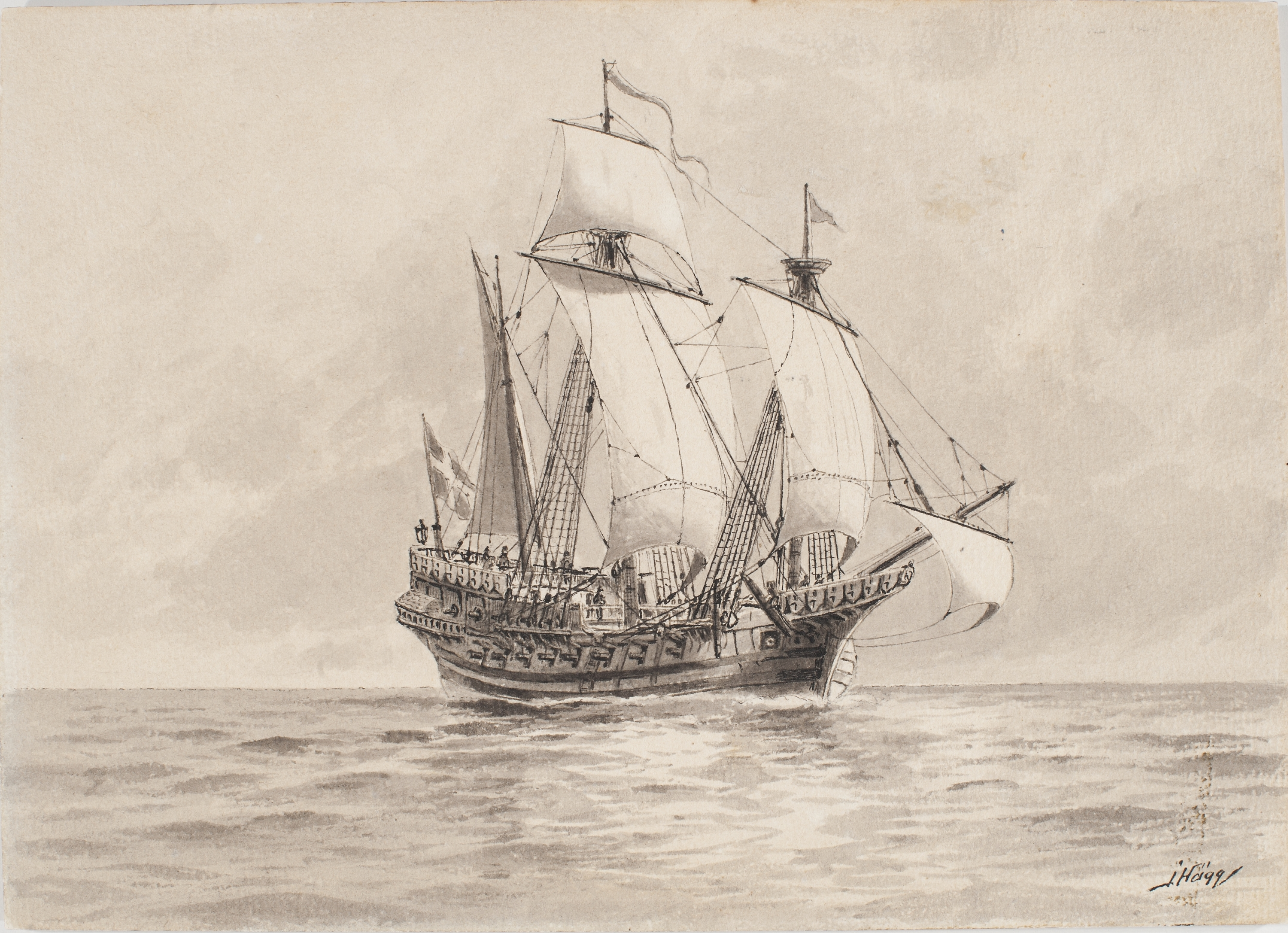
- The Swedish flagship, the Lybska Svan
Date	November 1522
Location	Stockholm Archipelago
Result	Swedish–Lübeck victory
Territorial changes	Danish fleet withdraws from Stockholm

Belligerents
Sweden; Free City of Lübeck	Denmark

Commanders and leaders
Erik Fleming; Staffan Sasse; Friedrich Bruun	Søren Norby

Units involved
Unknown	Unknown

Strength
18 ships; 10 Swedish ships; 8 Lübeckian ships	39 ships; 30 transport ships; 9 archipelago ships

Casualties and losses
None	30 transport ships

The naval battle off Stockholm occurred in November 1522 during the Swedish War of Liberation, when a Danish fleet of 39 ships under the command of Søren Norby entered Stockholm Archipelago to relieve the besieged Danish garrison in Stockholm. It was soon approached by a united Swedish–Lübeckian fleet under the commands of Erik Fleming, Staffan Sasse, and Friedrich Bruun. After a bloody battle, Norby withdrew, leaving behind 30 transport ships.

== Background ==
In July of 1522, Danish admiral Søren Norby attempted to send supplies into the garrison in Stockholm, which was being besieged by Swedish troops. To do this, he dispatched Junker Thomas with some ships towards Stockholm. However, these were intercepted by the Swedes and neither Thomas or the ships came back to Norby.

== Battle ==
In November, Norby made another attempt to send supplies into Stockholm. Using 9 archipelago ships and 30 transport vessels with provisions and other necessities, he sailed into Stockholm's Archipelago. He was soon met by a fleet of 18 ships, 10 Swedish and 8 Lübeckian, the Swedish ships under the command of Erik Fleming and Staffan Sasse, while the Lübeckian ones were under the command of Friedrich Bruun. After a bloody fight, he was eventually forced to withdraw from the archipelago, abandoning the 30 transport ships to the Swedish–Lübeckian fleet. It is likely that he would have suffered an even worse defeat had the Lübeckian ships not been passive. Instead of attacking him with the Swedes, they dropped their anchors and allowed him to retreat.

== Aftermath ==
After the failed relief expedition, Stockholm's days were numbered, and its fall was inevitable. Despite not receiving new supplies and suffering from disease and hunger, the city held out for over half a year until finally capitulating.

== Works cited ==
- Alin, Oscar [in Swedish] (1889). "Sveriges nydaningstid: Från år 1521 till år 1611" [Sweden's Renaissance: From 1521 to 1611]. Sveriges historia: Från äldsta tid till våra dagar [History of Sweden: From ancient times to the present day] (in Swedish). Vol. 3. Stockholm: Aktiebolaget Hiertas Bokförlag.
- Bäckström, Per Olof [in Swedish] (1884). "Svenska sjömakten 1521-1568" [Swedish naval power 1521-1568]. Svenska flottans historia [History of the Swedish navy] (in Swedish). Stockholm: P.A. Norstedt & Söners Förlag.
- Sundberg, Ulf (2010). Sveriges krig 1448-1630 [Sweden's wars 1448-1630] (in Swedish). Svenskt militärhistoriskt bibliotek. ISBN 9789185789627.
