= Nilsdotter =

Nilsdotter is a patronymic. Notable people with the surname include:

- Christina Nilsdotter (died 1399), Swedish singer and song teacher
- Karin Nilsdotter (c. 1551–1613), royal mistress of Charles IX of Sweden
- Kristina Nilsdotter (died 1254), Swedish noblewoman
- Margareta Nilsdotter (died 1630), Swedish businessperson and shipbuilder
- Maria Nilsdotter i Ölmeskog (1756–1822), Swedish farmer
