= Margareta Clausdotter =

Swedish writer, nun and genealogist

Margareta Clausdotter (died 10 December 1486) was a Swedish writer and genealogist, a Roman Catholic nun of the Bridgettine order and from 1473 until her death, abbess of the Vadstena Abbey. Christina Brask translated the Antiphonarium for her.

She is best known for the chronicle she authored on the family of Saint Bridget, which includes some legends and stories not known from any other sources. Her chronicle influenced later historical and genealogical writers. One story, about "Bengt Lagman", the king's brother who marries a woman of humbler origins, "Sigrid the Beautiful", has been most famously retold in the play Bröllopet på Ulfåsa (1865) by Swedish dramatist, Frans Hedberg (1828–1908) and the music written for the play by August Söderman (1832–1876). Bengt Lagman was the story of Bengt Magnusson (died 1294), however the story for the most part disagrees with, or is at least not verified by, contemporary sources.

== Other sources ==
- Brilioth, Yngve, "Bengt Magnusson", Svenskt biografiskt lexikon, vol. 3 (1922), p. 193–195.

Religious titles
Preceded by Katarina Petersdotter	Abbess of Vadstena; 1473-1486	Succeeded by Anna Paulsdotter
