= Vadstena Abbey =

Evangelical-Lutheran church and abbey from the medieval era

Vadstena Abbey Church
- Vadstena Klosterkyrka
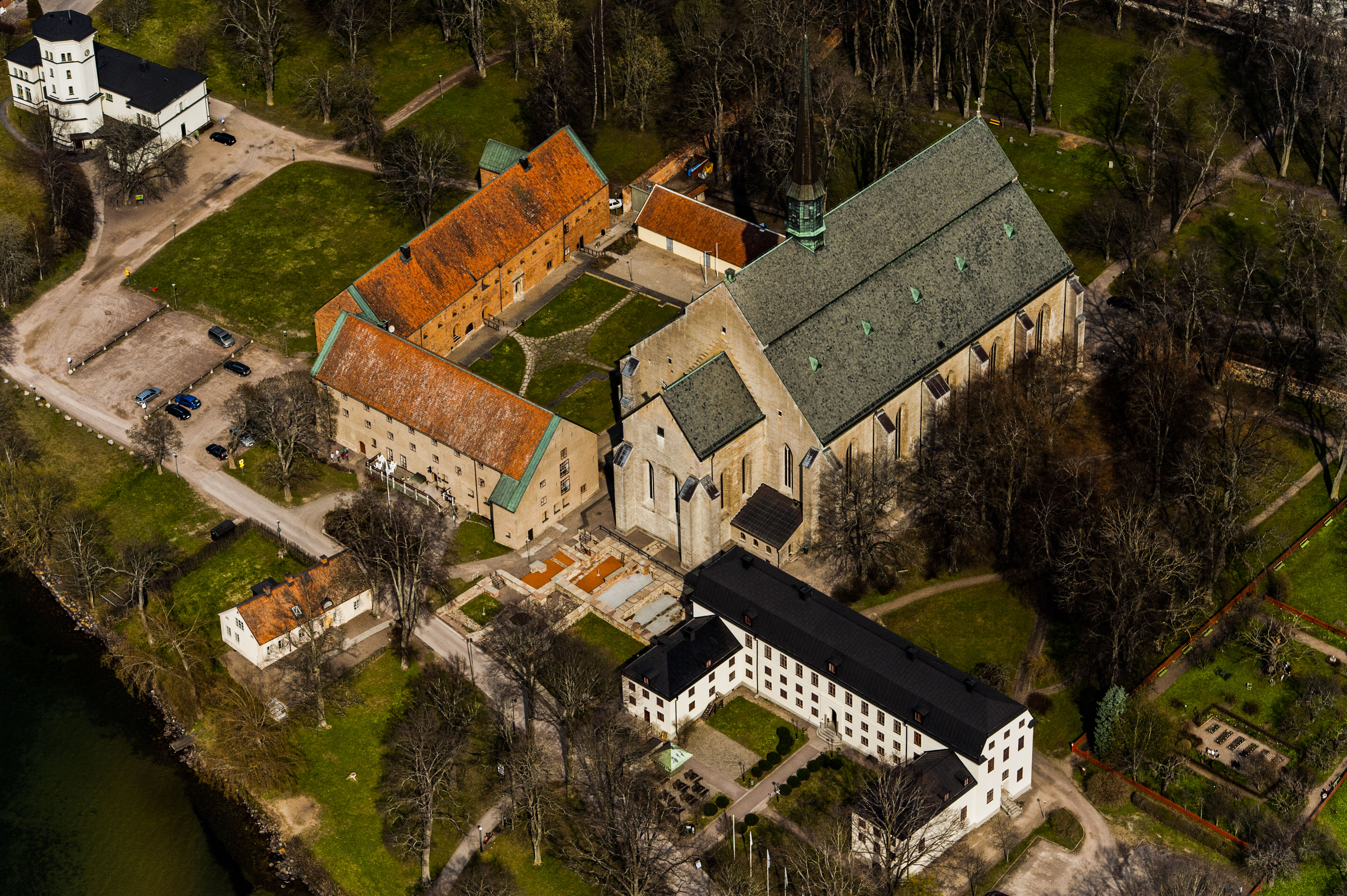
- Vadstena Abbey Evangelical-Lutheran Church, along with the attached monastery complex

- Location within Östergötland

Monastery information
- Order: Bridgettines
- Established: 1346
- Disestablished: 1595
- Diocese: Diocese of Linköping
- Controlled churches: Church of Sweden (Evangelical-Lutheranism)

Site
- Location: Vadstena, Östergötland County, Sweden
- Coordinates: 58°27′02″N 14°53′29″E

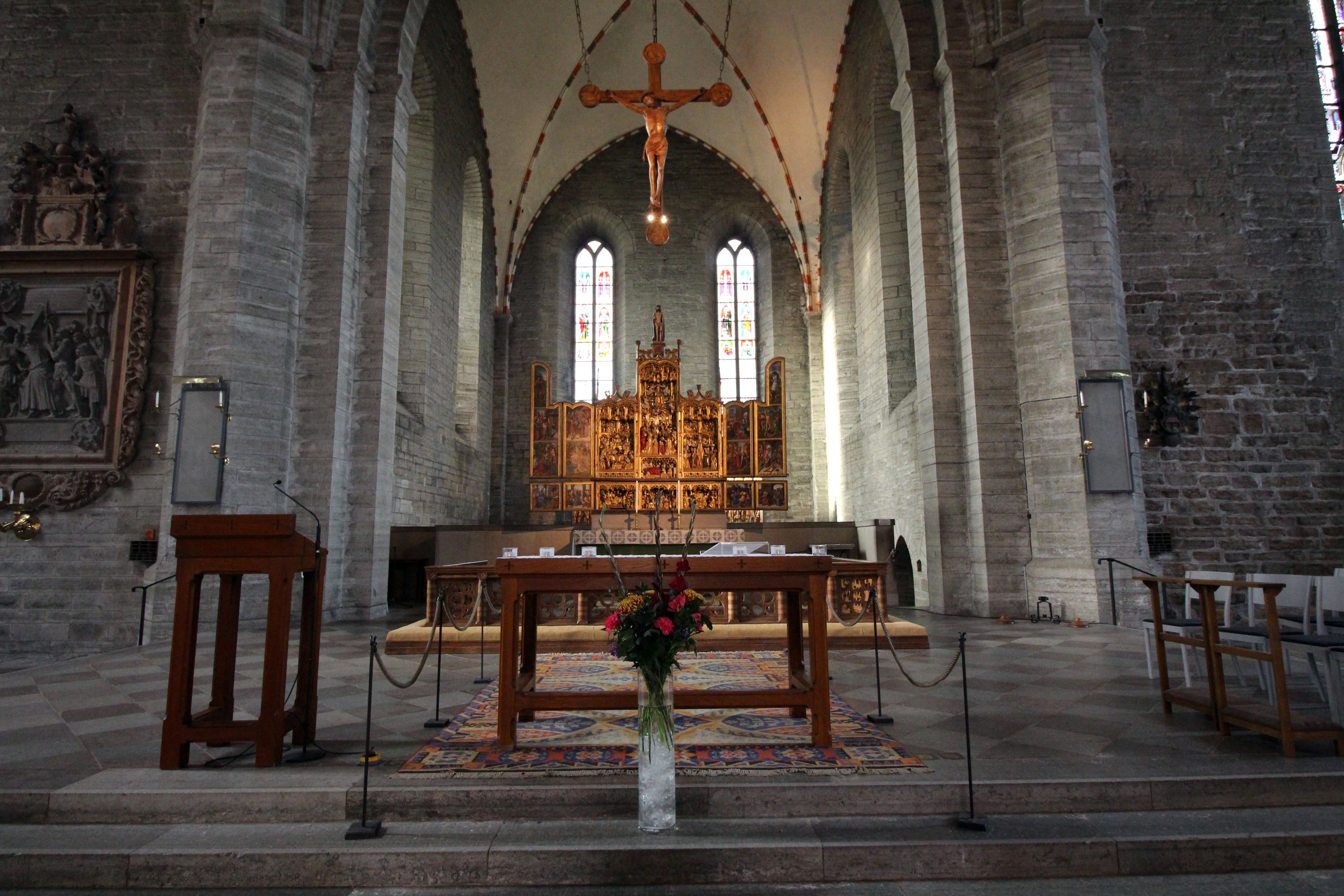
The chancel of Vadstena Abbey Evangelical-Lutheran Church

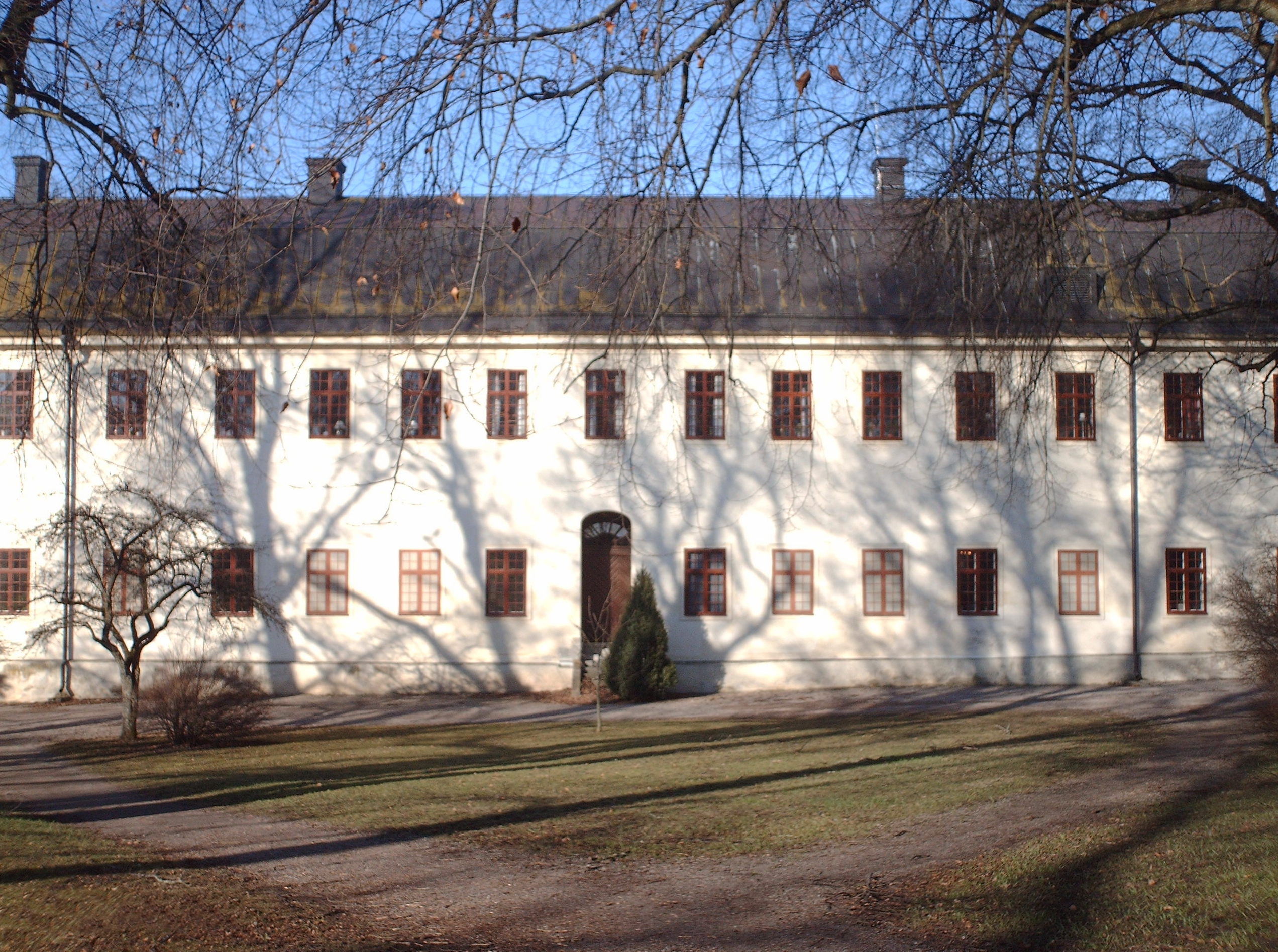
The Abbey

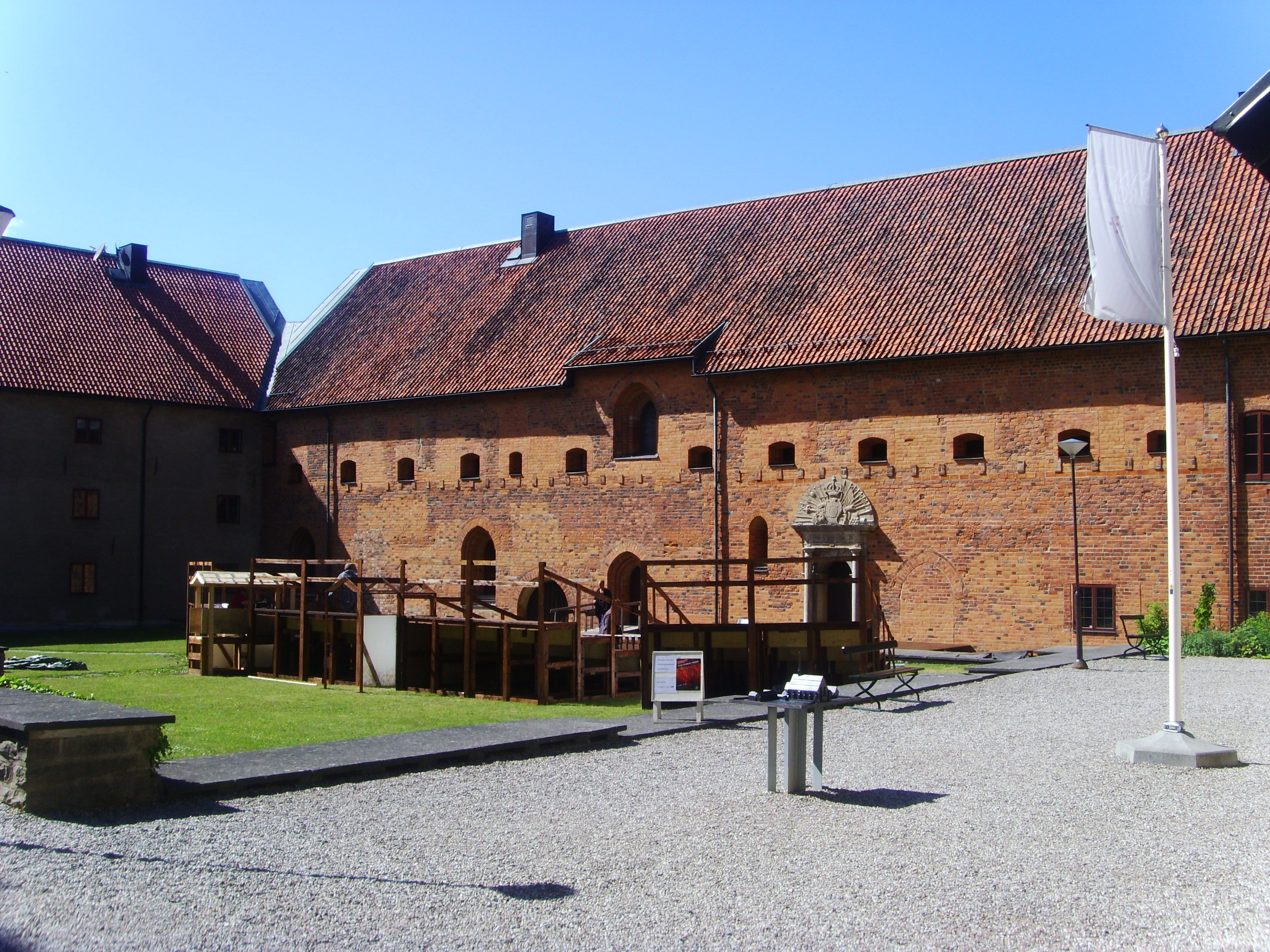
The inner yard of the Abbey

Vadstena Abbey is a historical building complex situated on Lake Vättern, which includes the Vadstena Abbey Church (Swedish: Vadstena Klosterkyrka), part of the Diocese of Linköping of the Evangelical-Lutheran Church of Sweden. The Mass and Divine Office, according to the Evangelical-Lutheran tradition, are celebrated in Vadstena Abbey Church daily. During the summer months, Vadstena Abbey Church receives between 2500 to 3000 pilgrims daily and for this, the Diocese of Linköping mantains a Pilgrim Center in the complex. As a popular place of Evangelical-Lutheran pilgrimage, Christians reach Vadstena Abbey Church through the Saint Birgitta Ways, while using The Pilgrim's Prayer Book (Pilgrimens tidegärd), which contains the canonical hours. Upon arrival to Vadstena Abbey Church, pilgrims attend Mass there.

Vadstena Abbey Church started as a wooden church, that burned down in 1388; it was rebuilt towards the close of the 14th century, under the direction of St Bridget of Sweden, who stated that she received the instructions from Jesus on how to build Vadstena Abbey Church. St Bridget of Sweden desired that the church be simple in its furnishings. On 16 February 1430, Vadstena Abbey Church was consecrated. Vadstena Abbey housed a Bridgettine convent from 1346 until 1605, when the last Swedish Bridgettine nun belonging to it died; this area now contains the Vadstena Abbey Museum. The abbey started on one of the farms donated to it by the king, but the town of Vadstena grew up around it. It served as the motherhouse of the Bridgettine Order from 1346 to 1595.

Annually, a celebration of the Feast of Saint Bridget occurs on July 23, with the offering of the Mass at Vadstena Abbey Church, including an elaborate church procession and homage to her relics.

== History ==
=== Foundation and duration ===
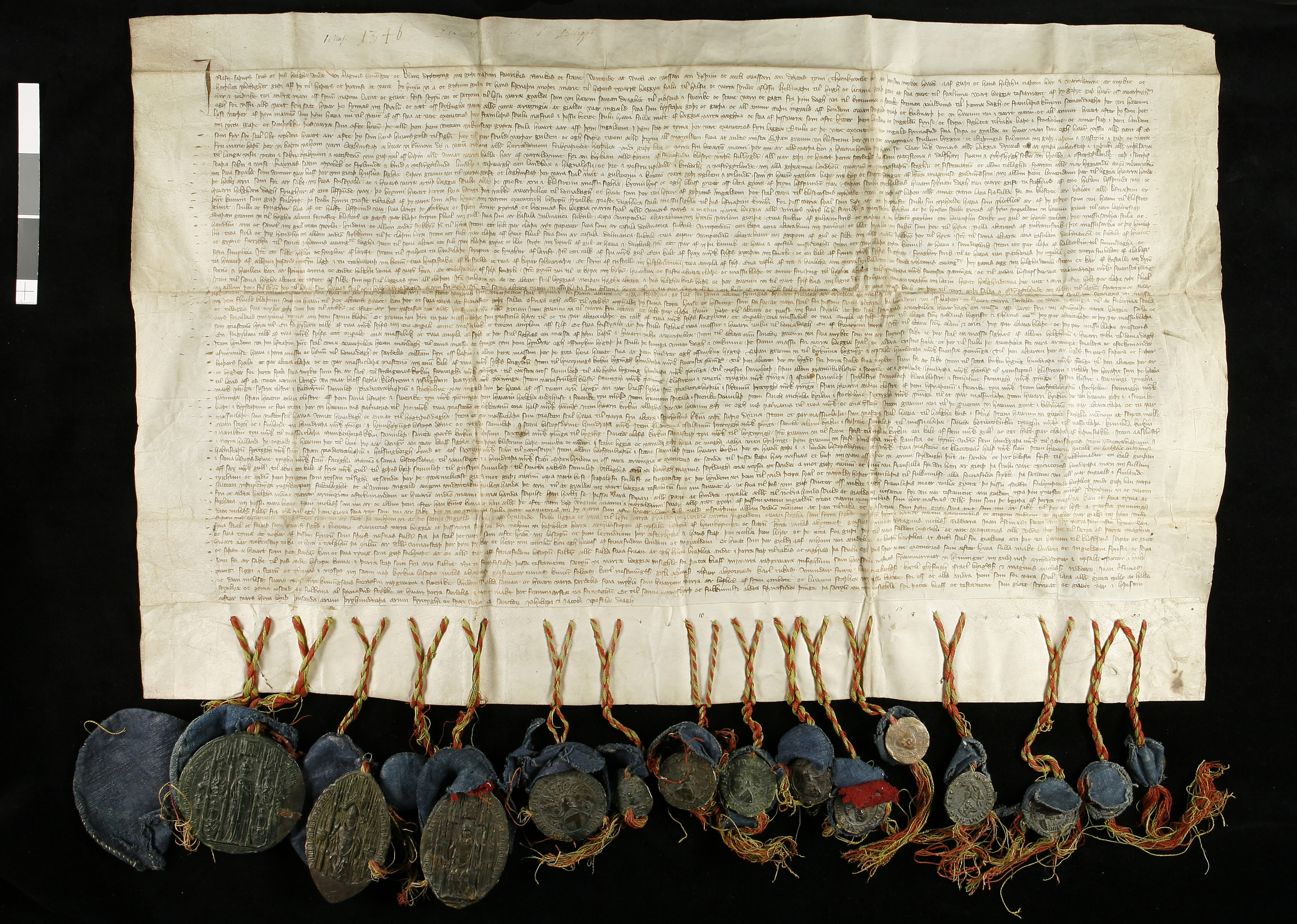
The will in which King Magnus IV and Queen Blanche donate 10 farms to support the foundation of Vadstena Abbey

The abbey was founded in 1346 by Saint Bridget with the assistance of King Magnus IV of Sweden and his Queen Blanche, who made a will donating ten farms, including that of Vadstena in Dal Hundred, Östergötland, to the abbey founded by Bridget.

The daughter of Saint Bridget, Saint Catherine, on arriving there in 1374 with the relics of her mother, found only a few novices under a Religious Superior. They chose Catherine as their abbess. She died in 1381, and it was not until 1384 that the abbey was blessed by the Bishop of Linköping. The first recognized abbess was Ingegerd Knutsdotter, granddaughter of Saint Bridget. The canonization of Saint Bridget in 1391 and the translation of her remains to the Abbey Church in 1394 added greatly to the fame and riches of her community. Prioress Christina Nilsdotter died at the abbey in 1399.

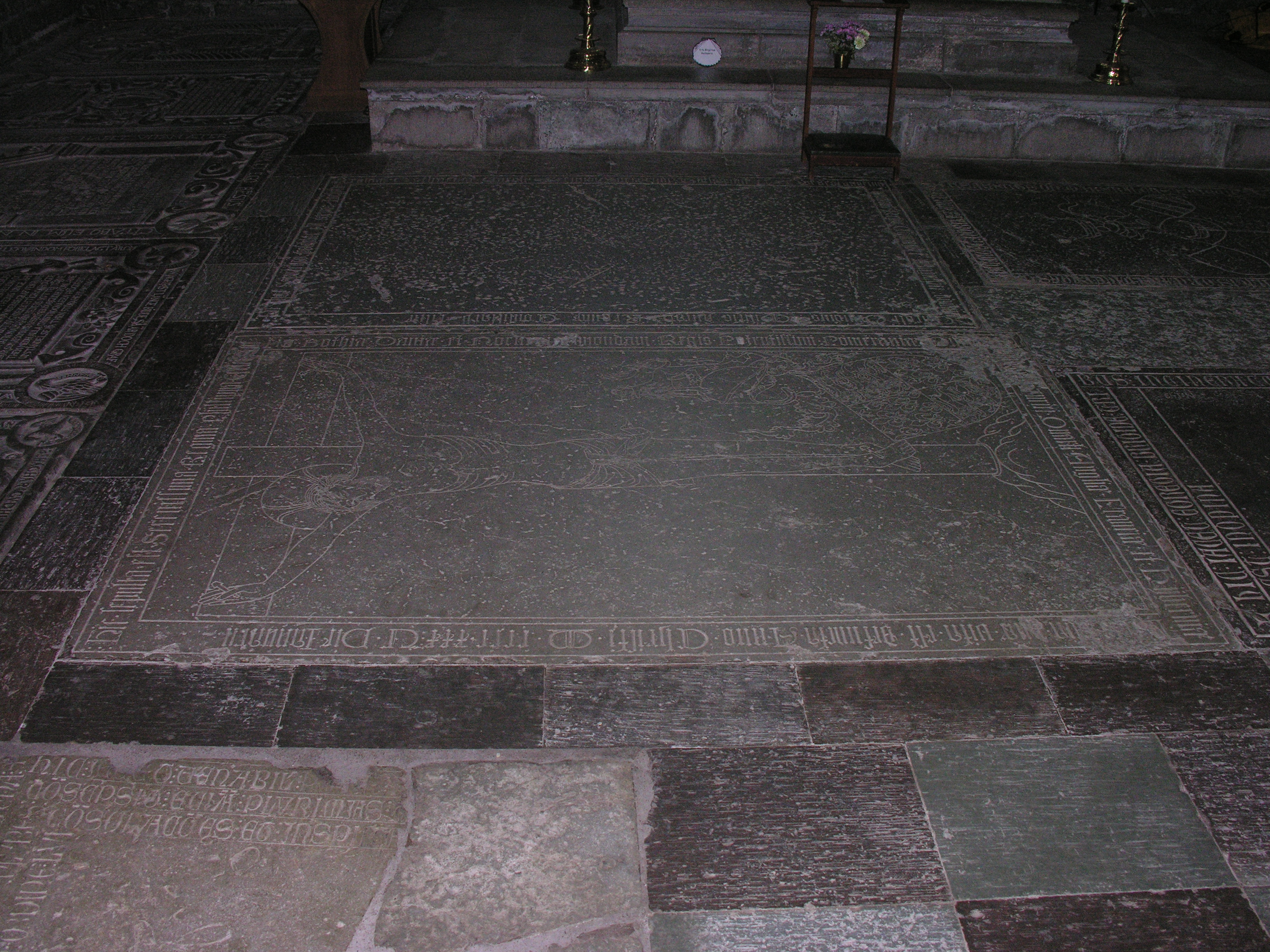
Gravestones of Queens Philippa and Catherine

In 1400 Duke Eric of Pomerania was invested at Vadstena by his great-aunt, Queen Margaret, as King of Denmark, Norway and Sweden. The grave of his wife, Queen Philippa, and that of Catherine, Queen Consort of King Carl II of Sweden, are located here.

Bridgetine literature consisted mostly of translations into Swedish of portions of the Bible or of the legends of the saints. Such writings as are extant have been published for the most part by the Svenska fornskriftsällskapet (Old Swedish Texts Society) of Stockholm. The manuscripts are held in the Royal Library, Stockholm (including two in Swedish in Birgitta's handwriting), and at the University Libraries of Uppsala (which also has contemplative manuscripts in English connected with the English mission), and in Lund.

Of these authors, the best known belonging to Vadstena are perhaps Margareta Clausdotter (abbess 1473, died 1486), author of a work on the family of St. Bridget (printed in "Scriptores Rerum Svecicarum", III, I, 207-16), and Nicolaus Ragvaldi, monk and General Confessor of the abbey (1476–1514), who composed several works.

The abbey was a double monastery, with both a male section of 25 monks and a female section of 60 nuns. The monks were organised under the General Confessor and the nuns under a prioress, while the abbey as a whole was organised under an abbess, who was elected by both the monks and the nuns.

The abbey was greatly favored by the royal house and nobility and became the spiritual center of the country as well as the greatest landowner in Sweden. The abbey was known to manage a hospital and retirement home, which is recorded from 1401. Early on, Vadstena Abbey supported Beghards and Beguines, the latter often aristocratic women, who had a poor reputation among Church authorities. In 1412, the abbey was ordered to expel them, but this was not done until 1506. In 1436, the bailiff Jösse Eriksson sought asylum in the abbey, but was forced out and arrested all the same. In 1419, the abbey was subjected to an investigation wherein the abbess, as well as the nuns, were accused of having accepted personal gifts and having entertained male guests at unacceptable hours.

Vadstena Abbey also had international fame as the motherhouse of all the monasteries of the Bridgettine Order, such as Reval, Nådendal, Bergen and Danzig. It kept in contact with other monasteries, performed inspections of them and sent both nuns and monks to them when they were lacking in members. In 1406, for example, an English delegation headed by Henry FitzHugh, 3rd Baron FitzHugh arrived asking for members in order to establish a Bridgettine monastery in England, and in 1415 four nuns, three female novices, one monk and one priest left the abbey under great celebrations for the foundation of what became the famed Syon Abbey.

=== Post-reformation and monastery dissolution ===
After the introduction of the Reformation in Sweden in 1527, a number of monastic communities in Sweden were effectively ended by the ban against accepting new novices and assets were declared crown property in accordance with the Reduction of Gustav I of Sweden. The existing members were allowed to stay until their death, to be supported by an allowance from the former property of the monastery, or to leave if they wished. Vadstena Abbey, however, was exempted from this ban and allowed to accept novices even after the Reformation, though only by special permission from the monarch. This regulation was directed to Bishop Hans Brask by King Gustav Vasa in 1527 after an elopement by a novice the previous year.

The Abbey had a favorable position because of its international fame and because of its strong ties with the Swedish nobility, due to its foundress. Many of the monks and nuns were from the nobility, including the King's own sister, Anna. It also served as a burial ground for many noble families. The nuns and monks of Vadstena Abbey were, however, allowed to leave the abbey if they wished. Among the most notable who did leave was Abbess Birgitta Botolfsdotter, who left the abbey to marry. In 1544 the King, reportedly after having been asked by some of the monks and nuns, issued an instruction which specifically allowed the nuns and monks to leave the Vadstena Abbey to marry if they wished to, and specifically forbade the abbess and the other members of the abbey from stopping them. The younger nuns were reportedly more willing to leave than the older, but the nuns in general stayed more often than the monks. In large part, this may be due to the fact that the monks, after having converted to Lutheranism, were provided with the professions of medical doctor, pastor or teacher, while the nuns seldom had a choice other than marriage. As a result, far more of them remained in the abbey than did the monks.

In May 1540, the Abbey was visited by the local Evangelical-Lutheran bishop. The Catholic Mass was replaced by the Lutheran Mass, which was ordered to be held in the Vadstena Abbey Church. An inventory of the abbey's valuables was made by the Crown, and in 1543, most of the books and valuables were confiscated. The abbey was allowed to receive private donations on condition that the monks refrain from the public Catholic sermons they had evidently been preaching until then.

Vadstena Abbey was granted large donations by private benefactors, both from the public and from the Royal Palace. Among the notable benefactors were Queen Margaret Leijonhufvud and her family, the former Abbess Birgitta Botolfsdotter and her wealthy husband, Queen Karin Månsdotter, Anna Hogenskild and Jöran Persson. In 1549, the majority of the monks were ordered to leave the abbey. In 1550, the nuns were moved to the smaller part of the abbey, the wing previously belonging to the monks, and in 1555 the male contingent of the abbey was formally abolished and Vadstena Abbey became an all-female community. During the Northern Seven Years' War of 1567, the abbey was looted by Danish soldiers. In 1568, the number of nuns was counted as 18.

During the reign of King John III (1569–1592), the abbey was restored and enriched, and the abbess was on very good terms with the royal couple. In 1575, John III granted the abbey the right to receive novices without restriction again, and his Catholic Queen, Catherine Jagellon, made donations to it and forged contacts between the abbey and Rome. The Jesuit Antonio Possevino, as Papal Legate, reformed it in 1580. At this occasion, the abbess and the prioress were made to swear the Tridentine Oath of 1564 and the nuns were made to take their vows a second time. Possevino also left with a group of boys to be educated as Catholic priests. In 1587, the first Catholic Solemn Mass since the Reformation was held in the abbey during a visit by the King and the Crown Prince, and in 1592, a seminary to prepare Catholic priests was founded. The Catholic King Sigismund granted the Vadstena Abbey his protection at his coronation in 1594. The Papal Legate Germanico Malaspina visited the abbey and a young girl was accepted as a novice.

Later in 1594, however, Duke Charles, later Charles IX of Sweden, took power and ordered the dissolution of Vadstena Abbey. In 1595, the majority of the remaining 11 nuns left with their abbess and, after having spent the winter in Söderköping, sailed to the Bridgettine Abbey of Danzig, Marienbrunn Abbey, in the spring of 1596. Three remaining nuns were there for the visit of Bishop Abraham Angermannus in July 1596. Of these, one married an officer and courtier of Charles IX, another one became lady-in-waiting to Queen Christina, and the last one, Karin Johansdotter, was allowed to stay in the building of the former abbey employed as a caretaker to the abbey's gardens until 1605.

When Magnus Vasa, Duke of Östergötland, died in 1595 he was buried in the abbey church. His sarcophagus can still be seen today.

=== Early modern period to present ===
Vadstena Abbey Church has continued to function as an active Evangelical-Lutheran parish church, being part of the Diocese of Linköping of the Evangelical-Lutheran Church of Sweden. The Mass and Divine Office, according to the Evangelical-Lutheran tradition, are celebrated in Vadstena Abbey Church daily. During the summer months, Vadstena Abbey Church receives between 2500 to 3000 pilgrims daily. The abbey church contains a few memorials of St. Bridget, including her relics. This devotional site, known as The Blue Church, is visited by both Evangelical-Lutheran and Roman Catholic pilgrims. The Blue Church contains relics of Saint Bridget in a red-coloured casket as well as medieval sculptures of Saint Bridget, Saint Anne and the Blessed Virgin Mary, as well as other medieval art. As a popular place of Evangelical-Lutheran pilgrimage, Christians reach Vadstena Abbey Church through the Saint Birgitta Ways, using The Pilgrim's Prayer Book (Pilgrimens tidegärd) throughout the day; the first of the three prayers in The Pilgrim's Prayer Book are the same prayers said daily at 8 am, 12 pm and 4 pm at Vadstena Abbey Church. During their journey to Vadstena Abbey Evangelical-Lutheran Church, pilgrims pause along the Saint Birgitta Ways trails to pray from this prayer book (which functions as a small breviary to pray the canonical hours). Upon arrival to Vadstena Abbey Church, Evangelical-Lutheran pilgrims attend the celebration of Mass and receive the Eucharist there. Those who complete the pilgrimage to Vadstena Abbey Evangelical-Lutheran Church are bestowed with a pilgrim certificate from Vadstena Abbey Evangelical-Lutheran Church.

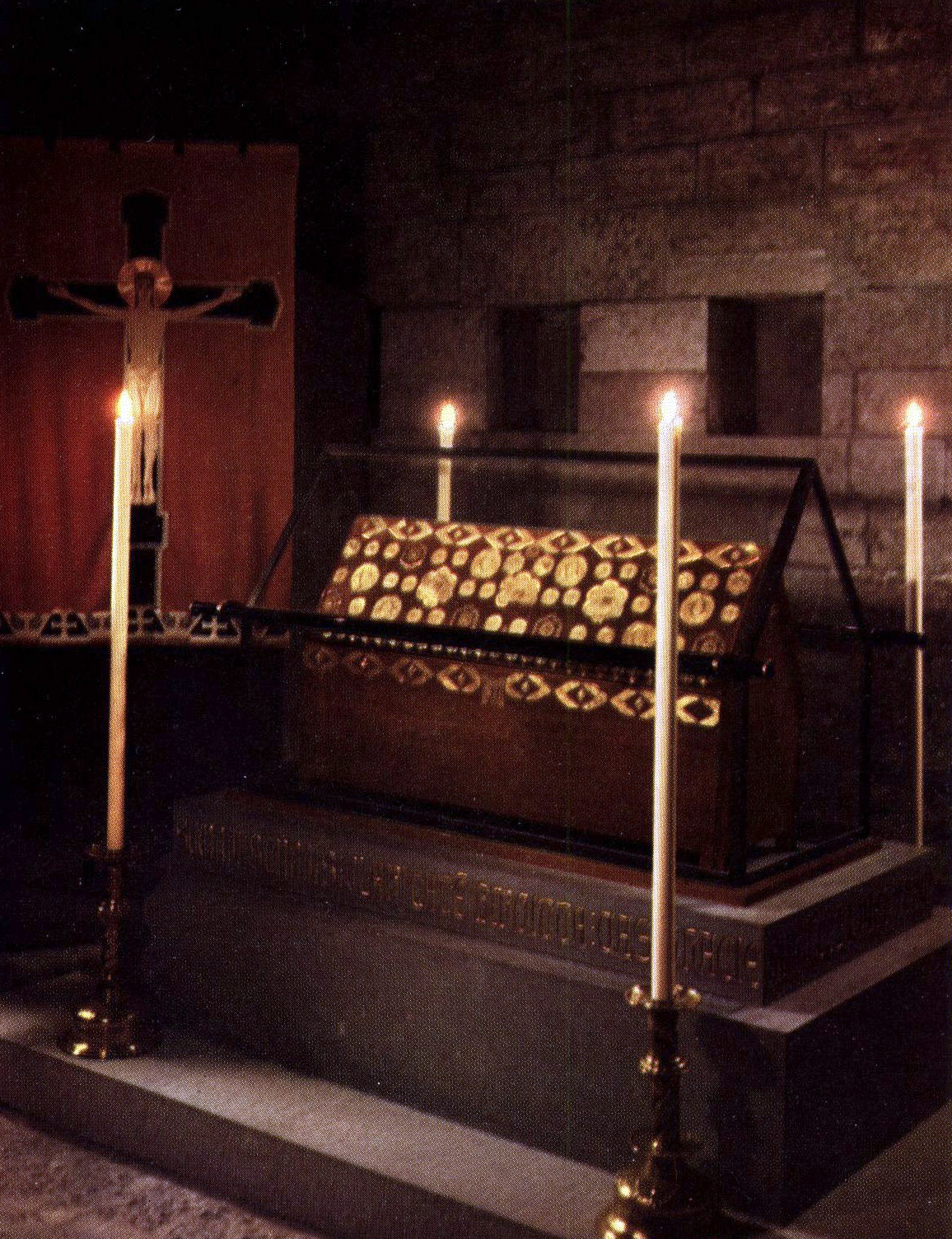
The casket of Saint Bridget of Sweden at Vadstena Abbey Church is venerated by Evangelical-Lutherans

Brochures at Linköping Cathedral encouraging pilgrimage to Vadstena Abbey Church through the Saint Birgitta Ways

Sign in Omberg indicating the pilgrimage trail of the Saint Birgitta Ways to Vadstena Abbey Church

Entrance to the Vadstena Abbey Church Pilgrim Centre

Café for Christian pilgrims undertaking the pilgrimage to Vadstena Abbey Church through the Saint Birgitta Ways

Apart from the Vadstena Abbey Church, after Karin Johansdotter left the former abbey in 1605, the other buildings were left empty for almost 40 years. There were plans to found a university in them, but nothing came of this. In 1641, a Krigsmanshus (home for veterans) was founded for retired and invalid soldiers and their families, and was housed in the former nuns' wing for over 140 years. It also provided a school for the soldiers' children. The home was closed in 1783. In 1795, a hospital for venereal diseases was established in both the male and female sections of the former abbey. From the 1840s, it also received patients with other illnesses and became a public hospital. The hospital was moved to modern facilities in 1909. The nuns' section of the abbey was used as a prison from 1810 to 1825, and after that as a part of the Vadstena Insane Asylum until 1951. The northern building, which contains the nuns' chapterhouse and dormitory, was going to be converted into other uses when in 1956 it was discovered to contain substantial remains of a thirteenth-century royal palace. A thorough restoration was undertaken and in 2003 it became a monastery museum, Vadstena klostermuseum.

Three other buildings also remain: the best preserved is the royal palace/nuns' chapterhouse/museum mentioned above; the other two have been converted into a hotel and restaurant.

In 1935, the religious sisters of the Birgittine Order came to Vadstena under the Saint Elisabeth Hasselblad and established a convent outside of the grounds of the former abbey. In 1963 the convent was refounded as a Bridgettine convent of the original branch of the Order. In 1963, Bridgettine nuns established Saint Bridget's Convent of Pax Mariae near Vadsena Abbey Church named after Mary's Peace (Latin: Pax Mariae). It was established from a Bridgettine abbey in the Netherlands, one of the very few abbeys of the original branch of the Order that still remain, and currently numbers eight nuns. In 1991 it was raised to the status of an autonomous abbey.

== Vadstena Abbey churchyard ==
The monastery churchyard, immediately east of the abbey church, has been associated with the Swedish physician and lichenologist Erik Acharius (1757–1819), who lived and worked in Vadstena and is often described as a founding figure in the scientific study of lichens. Acharius was buried in the old churchyard, but later archival checks found no surviving record of the exact location of his grave, which is thought to have been lost as burial plots were reused over time.

A lichen survey of the churchyard in 2013 recorded 120 taxa, including lichenicolous (lichen-dwelling) fungi, and reported several locally uncommon species. The authors connected this diversity to the range of available substrates, with weathered gravestones and monuments of differing composition (from limestone to more acidic stone) alongside mature deciduous trees such as Scots elm (Ulmus glabra), ash (Fraxinus excelsior), and horse chestnut (Aesculus hippocastanum). The same survey also reported Lecanora semipallida as a first record for the province of Östergötland.

== Chronology ==
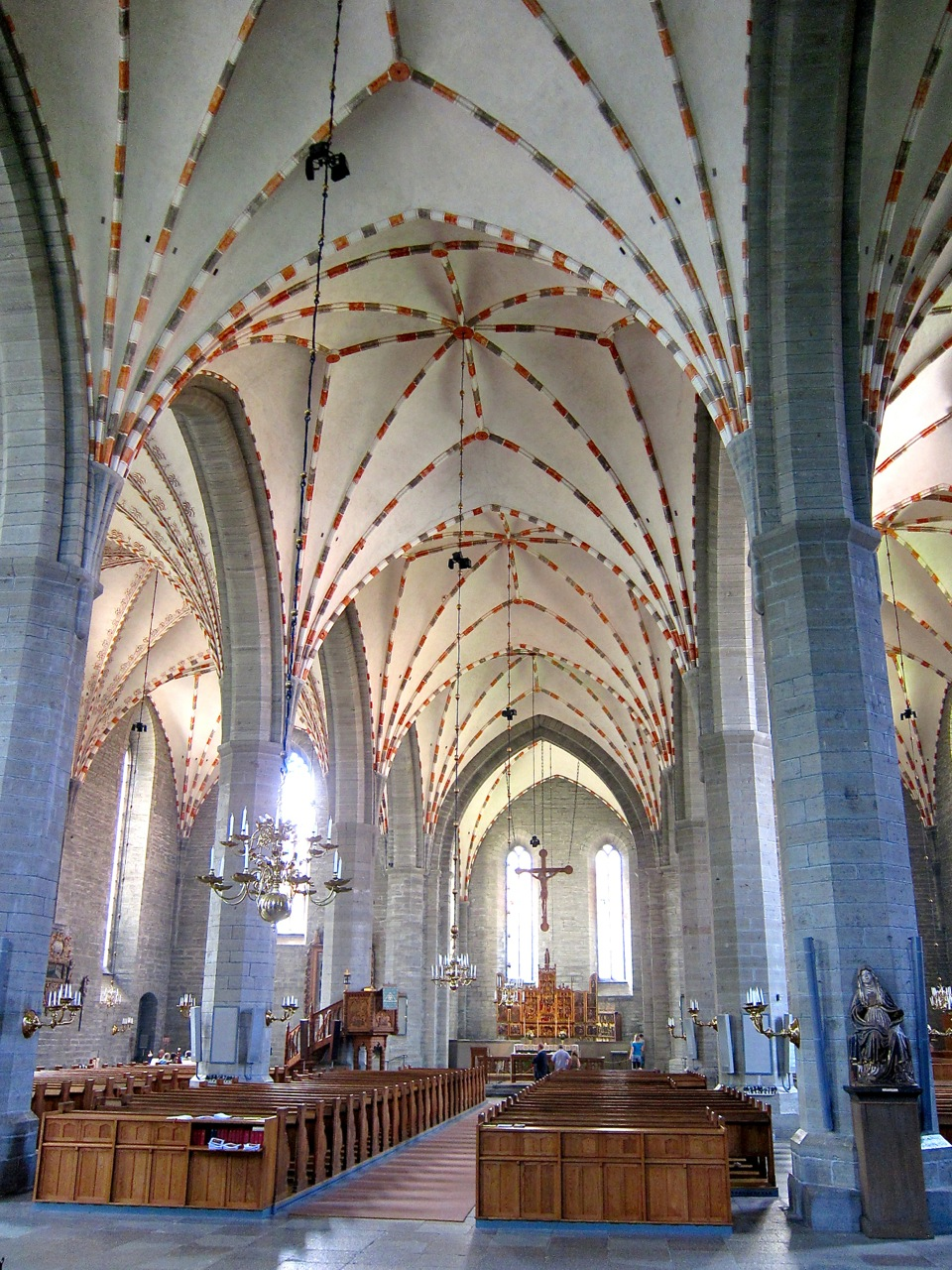
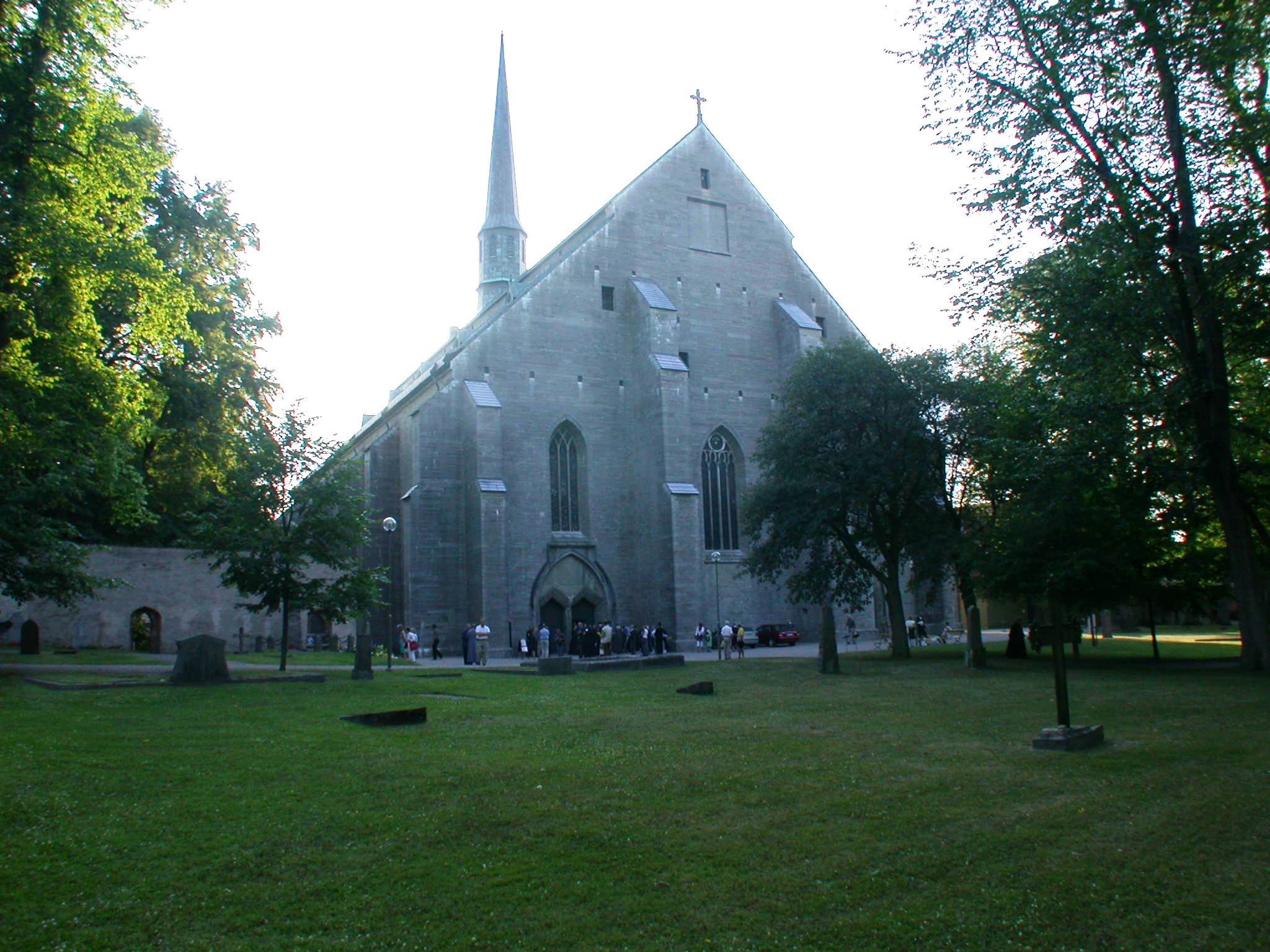
Vadstena Church is a parish church of the Diocese of Linköping of the Church of Sweden. The Mass and Divine Office, according to the Evangelical-Lutheran tradition, are celebrated daily, with Vadstena Church receiving between 2500 to 3000 pilgrims daily during the summer months.
- 1346 - King Magnus IV and Queen Blanche donate the royal estate Vadstena kungsgård to the foundation of a future monastery.
- 1370 - Pope Urban V gives his approval to the plan of St Bridget.
- 1373 - Bridget dies in Rome.
- 1374 - The remains of Bridget are taken to Vadstena. Her daughter, Saint Catherine of Vadstena is elected Abbess of Vadstena.
- 1384 - The Abbey is officially blessed.
- 1391 - Bridget is declared a saint.
- 1430 - Queen Philippa is buried here and the Church of Vadstena Abbey is blessed.
- 1451 - Queen Catherine is buried here.
- 1495 - A printing press is installed at the abbey.
- 1527 - King Gustav I bans the Abbey from accepting any new novices without special permission from the monarch. The nuns and monks are given permission to leave the community if they so wish.
- 1540 - The Catholic Mass is replaced with the Lutheran Mass, which has since been held in the abbey church that is a parish church of the Diocese of Linköping of the Evangelical-Lutheran Church of Sweden.
- 1541 - The Abbey is allowed to receive private donations again, but most of its assets are confiscated.
- 1544 - The monarch specifically bans the abbey from preventing members from leaving.
- 1549 - The majority of the monks are evicted from the abbey.
- 1550 - The Abbey church is closed to the members of the abbey, who are limited to use of the former monks' chapel. The nuns and the few remaining monks are limited to the use of only the small wing of the abbey formerly the monks' section.
- 1555 - The male contingent of the Abbey is dissolved, and the monks leave Vadstena Abbey.
- 1567 - Danish soldiers loot the abbey during the Northern Seven Years' War.
- 1575 - King John III of Sweden allows the Abbey to accept novices without restriction again.
- 1580 - The Abbey is visited and reformed by the Papal Legate Antonio Possevino.
- 1587 - The first public Solemn Mass according to the Roman Catholic tradition, since the Reformation, is celebrated in the presence of the King and Crown Prince.
- 1592 - A seminary for the education of Roman Catholic priests is founded.
- 1595 - Duke Magnus is buried here and the monastic community of the Abbey is dissolved.
- 1641 - A home for retired and invalid soldiers is founded in the former abbey. It is closed in 1783.
- 1795 - A hospital for venereal diseases is founded in the former abbey. It is closed in 1909.
- 1810 - A prison is founded in the former nuns' wing. It is closed in 1825.
- 1826 - The former nuns' wing is transformed into a lunatic asylum. That is closed in 1951. ----
- 1935 - Sisters of the Order of Saint Bridget open a rest home close to the estate.
- 1963 - Saint Bridget's Convent of Pax Mariae (Roman Catholic) is opened close to Vadstena Abbey Evangelical-Lutheran Church and its monastery complex.

== The abbesses of Vadstena ==
- 1374–1381 : Catherine of Vadstena (not officially installed)
- 1381–1385 : Margareta Bosdotter (Oxenstierna) (not officially installed)
- 1385–1403 : Ingegerd Knutsdotter (officially installed in 1388)
- 1403–1422 : Gerdeka Hartlevsdotter
- 1422–1447 : Bengta Gunnarsdotter
- 1447–1452 : Ingeborg of Holstein (first time)
- 1452–1456 : Katarina Bengtsdotter
- 1457–1457 : Katarina Ulfsdotter
- 1457–1465 : Ingeborg of Holstein (second time)
- 1465–1473 : Katarina Petersdotter
- 1473–1486 : Margareta Clausdotter
- 1487–1496 : Anna Paulsdotter
- 1496–1501 : Margareta Thuresdotter
- 1501–1518 : Anna Bülow
- 1518–1529 : Anna Germundsdotter
- 1529–1534 : Katarina Eriksdotter
- 1534–1539 : Birgitta Botolfsdotter
- 1539–1548 : Katarina Mattsdotter (died 1559)
- 1548–1553 : Margareta Nilsdotter
- 1553–1564 : Katarina Bengtsdotter Gylta (first time)
- 1564–1565 : Ingegerd Larsdotter
- 1565–1593 : Katarina Benktsdotter Gylta (second time)
- 1593–1595 : Katarina Olofsdotter ----

== See also ==
- Bjärka-Säby Monastery
- Pirita Convent
- Christina Brask, 15th c. nun
- Sisters of the Holy Spirit at Alsike Convent
