= Karlsdóttir =

Karlsdottir is an Icelandic patronymic name. People known by this name include the following:

- Hanna María Karlsdóttir (born 1948), Icelandic actress
- Hólmfríður Karlsdóttir (born 1963), Icelandic former model and beauty queen

== See also ==
- Karlsdotter
