= Anna Paulsdotter =

Anna Paulsdotter (died 9 October 1500), was a Swedish Bridgettine nun. She was the abbess of Vadstena Abbey from 1486 until 1496.

Anna Paulsdotter was accepted to the order in 1456, became the prioress of the nun's part of the abbey in 1473 and the abbess of the whole double monastery in 1486.

In June 1487, she sent an envoy to Rome to apply for the canonization of Catherine of Vadstena. In September of that year, the city of Vadstena burned to the ground with the exception of the abbey, which was attributed to the assistance of the Virgin Mary and Saint Bridget in subduing the flames dressed in white. In 1488, she received the two monks back from Rome, and celebrated the solemn Translation (relic) of Catherine of Vadstena, assisted by the regent, Sten Sture the Elder. In 1491–93, she had the first complete description of the visions of Bridget printed in Latin in Lübeck by Bartholomæus Gothan. In 1495, she had the first printing press in Sweden installed in the abbey.

She retired for health reasons in 1496.

Religious titles
| Preceded by Margareta Clausdotter | Abbess of Vadstena; 1486-1496 | Succeeded by Margareta Thuresdotter |
