= Christina Brask =

Christina Hansadotter Brask, or Christin Hansadotter (1459 – 5 March 1520), was a Swedish writer and translator, and a member of the Bridgettine Order in Vadstena Abbey.

== Biography ==
Christina Hansadotter became a nun at Vadstena Abbey in 1473. Many nuns were active in translating and copying books, and she also became a writer. She co-wrote the book Gudelika Snillis Väckiare with her colleague Kadrin or Katarina (d. 1519), which was published in the early 16th century, making them the perhaps first female book writers of their country. Kadrin wrote the first half of the book, and Christina the second half. Christina is also identified as the translator of Antiphonarium for the Abbess Margareta Clausdotter, and as the author of Speculum Virginum and Christina Hansdotters bönbok.
