= Yläne =

- Former municipality
- Yläneen kunta Yläne kommun
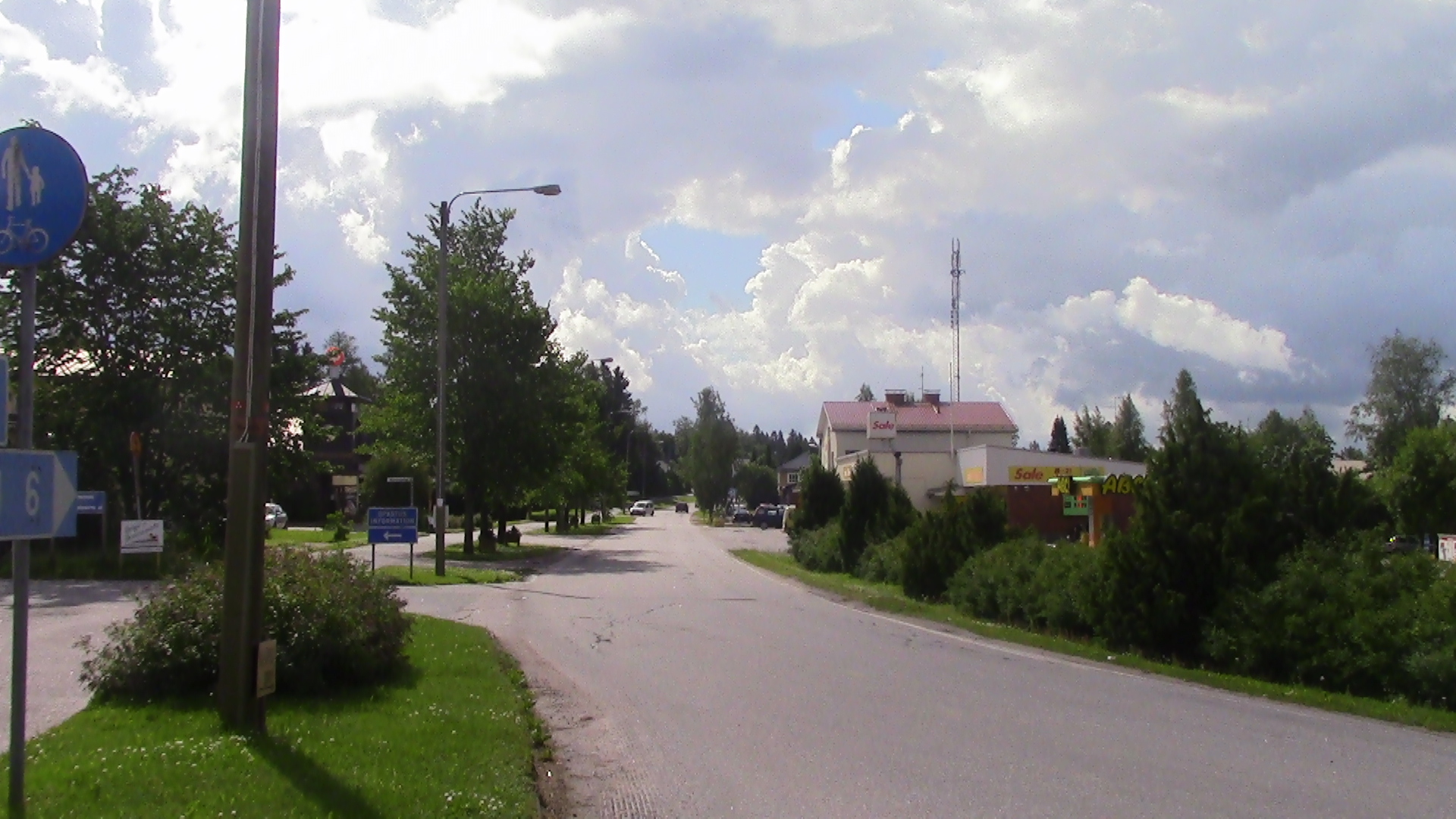
- The village of Yläne in July 2015

- Coat of arms

- Coordinates: 60°52′45″N 22°24′40″E
- Country: Finland
- Province: Western Finland
- Region: Southwest Finland
- Sub-region: Loimaa
- Merged with Pöytyä: January 1, 2009

Government
  - City manager: Risto Laurikainen

Area
  - Total: 364.76 km^{2} (140.83 sq mi)
  - Land: 342.77 km^{2} (132.34 sq mi)
  - Water: 21.99 km^{2} (8.49 sq mi)
  - Rank: 250th

Population (2003)
  - Total: 2,157
  - Rank: 341st
  - Density: 6.293/km^{2} (16.30/sq mi)
- +0.1 % change
- Time zone: UTC+2 (EET)
  - Summer (DST): UTC+3 (EEST)
- Official languages: Finnish
- Urbanisation: 45.4%
- Unemployment rate: 12.7%
- Climate: Dfc
- Website: www.ylane.fi

Yläne (Finnish pronunciation: [ˈylæne]) is a former municipality of Finland. It was consolidated to Pöytyä on 1 January 2009.

It is located in the province of Western Finland and is part of the Southwest Finland region. The municipality had a population of 2,119 (2004-12-31) and covered an area of 364.76km^{2} of which 21.99km^{2} is water. The population density was 6.18 inhabitants per km^{2}.

The municipality was unilingually Finnish.

== History ==
Yläne manor was the prime residence of Filippa Fleming (d. 1578) who broke with legal protocol by leaving it in her will to John III of Sweden rather than her brother Klas Fleming.
