= Märta Ulfsdotter =

Swedish noble and lady-in-waiting (1319–1371)

Margareta "Märta" Ulfsdotter, in Norway known as Merete Ulvsdatter (1319-1371), was a Swedish noble and lady in waiting. She was the daughter of Saint Bridget of Sweden and the head lady in waiting of Margaret I, Queen of Denmark.

== Life ==
She was the daughter of Saint Bridget of Sweden and Ulf Gudmarsson of Ulvåsa. In 1337, she married the Norwegian noble Sigvid Ribbing (d. 1345). After the death of her first spouse, she married the Swedish noble Knut Algotsson. She was the mother of Abbess Ingegerd Knutsdotter of Vadstena.

Between 1366 and 1371, she was the head of the court of Queen Margaret, whom she raised as the foster child with her daughter Ingegerd. According to reports, she frequently used spanking. It was said, that she maintained such as superiority and authority over her royal ward, that even after Margaret became queen, she was forced to succumb to Märta's rough treatment. In 1412, Queen Margaret appointed her daughter Katarina Knutsdotter to the same position for the new queen, Philippa of England.

== Sources ==
- Anteckningar om svenska qvinnor /
- Birgitta, utställningen 1918: beskrifvande förteckning öfver utställda föremål ...
