= Jenny Maria Schaub =

Swedish Roman Catholic nun

Jenny Maria Schaub (born 29 January 1961) is a Swedish Roman Catholic nun of the Bridgettine order and has been the 23rd Abbess of Vadstena Abbey (Abbey Pax Mariae) since 2016. She is known under the name "Mother Maria".

She grew up in Stockholm. She entered the Vadstena Abbey at the age of 30 in 1991.

Religious titles
Preceded by Karin Adolfsson	Abbess of Vadstena; 2016–	Succeeded by Current titleholder
