= Carlsdotter =

Carlsdotter is a Swedish patronymic name. People known by this name include the following:

- Elizabeth Carlsdotter Gyllenhielm (1622–1682), Swedish royal
- Görwel Christina Carlsdotter Gyllenstierna (1646–1708), Swedish noblewoman
- Lisbeth Carlsdotter, a child witness in the 1675 Katarina witch trials
- Sissa Carlsdotter, Swedish single mother of Godfrey Gummer Goodwin, Representative from Minnesota

== See also ==
- Karlsdotter
