= Valborg Fleming =

Finnish abbess

Valborg Joakimsdotter Fleming (died after 1542) was a Finnish abbess. She was the abbess of Nådendal Abbey in 1526–1531.

== Biography ==
She was born before 1494 as the daughter of the riksråd nobleman Joakim Fleming and Elin Björnsdotter of Svidja, and the sister of riksråd admiral Erik Joakimsson Fleming and Ivar Fleming, two of the most powerful men in Finland, and aunt of Filippa Fleming.

She was placed in Nådendal Abbey as a nun by her family, and was promoted abbess in 1526. This was one year before the Swedish Reformation. During the reformation, the convent was placed under pressure. The reformation allowed for the donors, or the families of former donors, to retract all donations made to convents, which placed all convents at financial risk: additionally, the convents were banned from accepting new members, and the existing were allowed to leave if they wished. These were problems Valborg had to attend during her tenure. Despite being the sister of the most powerful men in Finland, Valborg did not benefit in her struggle to protect the convent. Instead, her brothers took advantage of her difficult position, and they forced her to sign over a great amount of the convent's assets in exchange for their support and financial help. Valborg instead appealed directly to Gustav I of Sweden, and successfully asked for the convent to keep the property it owned upon its foundation from confiscation: she was in fact also granted two estates more for the abbey's upkeep (1530). This saved the convent financially (if temporarily) and made it possible to support their members.

In 1534, Valborg left the convent and settled with her brother Erik on his estate Svidja in Sjundeå parish.

== See also ==
- Katarina Gylta
