= Ingegerd Knutsdotter =

Swedish nun and noblewoman

- Born: 1356
- Died: September 14, 1412 (aged 55–56)
- Occupations: Nun and noble
- Known for: First official abbess of the Bridgettine Abbey of Vadstena
- Parents: Knut Algotsson (father); Märtha (Margareta) Ulfsdotter (mother)
- Relatives: Saint Bridget of Sweden (maternal grandmother)

Ingegerd Knutsdotter (1356 – September 14, 1412) was a Swedish nun and noble, the first official abbess of the Bridgettine Abbey of Vadstena in 1385/88–1403.

== Life ==
Ingegerd Knutsdotter was the daughter of Märtha (Margareta) Ulfsdotter and Knut Algotsson, and the maternal grandchild of Saint Bridget of Sweden. She was raised with the future Union Queen Margaret, as her mother served as royal governess. She was inducted into the Vadstena Abbey in 1374 at the age of eighteen, the same year as the body of Bridget was returned to Sweden.

=== Abbess ===
In 1385, she succeeded Margareta Bosdotter (Oxenstierna) as abbess, although the abbey was still not officially recognized. On 18 May 1388, after the Vadstena Abbey was officially recognized by the pope, she was ordained as its first official abbess.

During her tenure, she received the Union Queen Margaret when the monarch claimed to have had a vision, kissed the hands of all the members of the convent and was ordained as a lay sister. In 1400 the city of Vadstena was granted city rights by Queen Margaret on Ingegerd's request.

Ingegerd was accused of forgery of the convent's documents, for embezzlement of the convent's property, and for having brought the abbey to disrepute by breaking the vow of chastity. It was a great scandal, as she was related to Saint Bridget. Ingegerd was accused of having "consorted too intimately" with both worldly men as well as men of the church. She embezzled from the taxes to the pope and gave it to her relative, Bishop Canute of Linköping, who cooperated with her in draining the abbey's assets by accepting her forged seals as genuine. She was to have persuaded the monk Lucas Jacobi to break his vows and let him enter the female section of the abbey, where he destroyed the Letter of Privilege of the Vadstena Abbey by the Pope, and prevented six monks from being ordained to priesthood because they had refused to break their vows. The abbey complained to Queen Margaret, but without result, as Ingegerd enjoyed great status as the granddaughter of Saint Bridget.

In 1400, Ingegerd deposed the procurator of the monks, Sten Stensson, and replaced him with Lucas Jacobi, who was thereafter sent as her envoy to the Pope in Rome. In 1401, the monks opposed her by choosing Petrus Johannis as their general confessor, after which Johannis deposed Jacobi and reinstated Stensson. The abbey was then visited by Bishop Canute of Linköping, who ordered them to obey Ingegerd's authority. Hereafter, the nuns asked Ingegerd to leave her post. When she refused, the nuns and monks joined forces and deposed her in a coup and choose Christina Staffansdotter Stangenberg (d. 1438) as acting abbess while Ingegerd was investigated. Stangenberg and Martin, the leader of the monks, thereafter sent an appeal directly to the Pope and asked for an investigation of Ingegerds rule. Bishop Canute of Linköping tried to prevent the investigation by hiring men to attack and harass the Abbey's tenants and place people loyal to Ingegerd as vicars in the congregations placed under the abbey.

=== Later life ===
In November 1402, the Pope ordered Bishop Peter of Strängnäs to undertake an investigation against the accusations of forgery, embezzlement and for breaking the vow of chastity. After the investigation proved that the accusations was truthful, Ingegerd was declared guilty and deposed from her position as abbess the 5 February 1403. In the following election, she was replaced by Gerdeka Hartlevsdotter in the office.

After her deposition, Ingegerd lived as a regular member of the abbey. At the time of her death, the convent was assured that her sins were forgiven, as she had died with the words: "O! dulcissima Maria, Mater Dei, adjuva nunc", after having received the sacrament. She died in 1412.

Religious titles
| Preceded by Margareta Bosdotter (Oxenstierna) | Abbess of Vadstena; 1385-1403 | Succeeded by Gerdeka Hartlevsdotter |
