= Birgitta Botolfsdotter =

Birgitta Botolfsdotter, or Botulfsdotter (fl. 1567) was a Swedish Roman Catholic nun, abbess of Vadstena Abbey during the ongoing Protestant Reformation.

Birgitta was inducted into the order in 1492 by the Bishop of Linköping, who also financed her convent dowry. She became a prioress, and was in 1534 made abbess for the double convent of Vadstena. She was a controversial abbess; in 1539, she was deposed by the monks in the male section of the convent and replaced by Katarina Matsdotter. She left the convent and married the wealthy merchant Nils from the city of Vadstena. The reformation had by this time made it voluntary for nuns to stay in their convents or leave them and, if they wished, marry, but it was considered as a great shame if they did. She was likely the perhaps first former nun in Sweden to marry. The couple became one of the greatest benefactors and protectors of the convent. After the death of her spouse in 1566, she was again referred to as "Mother Sister" by the nuns, an honorific of the Abbess.
