= Filippa Fleming =

Filippa Eriksdotter Fleming (died 1578) was a Finnish noble and landowner.

== Family ==
She was born to Erik Fleming and Hebbla Siggesdotter, was the sister of Joakim Fleming and Klas Fleming, and niece of Valborg Fleming. She was the heir of a large number of estates in both Sweden proper as well as Swedish Finland, among them Yläne manor in Pöytis in Finland, which was her prime residence.

== Will ==
Fleming is known for her will, in which she bequeathed Yläne manor to John III of Sweden, her estates in Sweden proper to her niece Anna Fleming, and her remaining estates to her betrothed, Knut Jönsson Kurck.

Both the fact that she issued a will and that it was accepted were exceptional: being an unmarried female rather than a widow, she had no formal right to make a will at all, and in any case, it was breaking the law by excluding her brother from his inheritance.
