= Nicolaus Ragvaldi (monk) =

Swedish monk

Nicolaus Ragvaldi (a Latinized form of the Swedish Nils Ragvaldsson) (died 1514) was a monk in the Bridgettine Abbey of Vadstena, and served twice as its confessor general. He is known for a few translations and other writings known among the preserved parts of the library of the Abbey.

He was ordained in 1476 and held the position of confessor general for two periods, 1501-1506 and 1511–1512. He spent the years 1506–1508 on a visitation to the Bridgettine abbey of Riga, where he also held the position of confessor.

He is known for having translated the Book of Judges and the Book of Joshua into Swedish. He also made a Swedish translation and commentary of the Bridgettine ritual under the title Jomfru Marie yrtegardher ("The herbal gardens of the Virgin Mary") for the benefit of the nuns in Vadstena, who usually did not know enough Latin to understand the Latin ritual, originally composed in the 14th century. Extant manuscripts of his works are in the Royal Swedish Library in Stockholm and in the Uppsala University Library.
