= Gerdeka Hartlevsdotter =

Gerdeka Hartlevsdotter, or Hartlefsdotter, also called Gerdica (1370–1438), was a Swedish Bridgettine nun. She was the abbess of Vadstena Abbey from 1403 until 1422.

== Life ==
Gerdeka Hartlevsdotter was the daughter of Hartlev Bolk (d.1390) and Ingeborg (d. 1400) from Skänninge. Her mother became a member of Vadstena Abbey as a widow. Gerdeka, when abbess, had her father reburied in the abbey graveyard when it became permitted for non-members of the order to be buried there. Gerdeka was elected abbess in 1403 after the deposition of her predecessor Ingegerd Knutsdotter. Her reign has been described as a golden age for the abbey.

In 1406, she received a delegation from England headed by Henry FitzHugh, 3rd Baron FitzHugh, for the purpose of creating a daughter abbey of the Bridgettine order in England. In 1415, she completed the negotiations, and at the wish of the English King sent the nuns Anna Karlsdotter, Christina Finwitsdotter, Christina Esbjörnsdotter and Anna Esbjörnsdotter to England with great festivities, escorted by all the bishops of Sweden, the archbishop and a bishop from Norway, as well as several ambassadors, to found Syon Abbey in England.

In 1419, Vadstena was subjected to an investigation after rumors that not only the abbess Gerdica but also the nuns had received male guests in private and accepted gifts from them.

Gerdeka resigned from her position for health reasons on 27 April 1422.

== Sources ==
- Syster Patricia, OSsS 2003: ”Vadstena klosters abbedissor”. I: Beskow, Per & Annette Landen (red.) Birgitta av Vadstena. Pilgrim och profet 1303–1373. Natur & Kultur, Stockholm. p. 297–314.
- Tore Nyberg: Birgitta, hendes værk og hendes klostre i Norden (1991)
- Anteckningar om svenska qvinnor /
- https://archive.org/stream/MN5063ucmf_4/MN5063ucmf_4_djvu.txt
- https://archive.org/stream/MN42054ucmf_3/MN42054ucmf_3_djvu.txt
- Historiskt bibliotek utgifvet af Carl Silfverstolpe

Religious titles
Preceded by Ingegerd Knutsdotter	Abbess of Vadstena; 1403-1422	Succeeded by Bengta Gunnarsdotter
