= Nådendal Abbey =

Former Bridgettine abbey in Naantali, Finland

Coordinates: 60.471091°N 22.015357°E

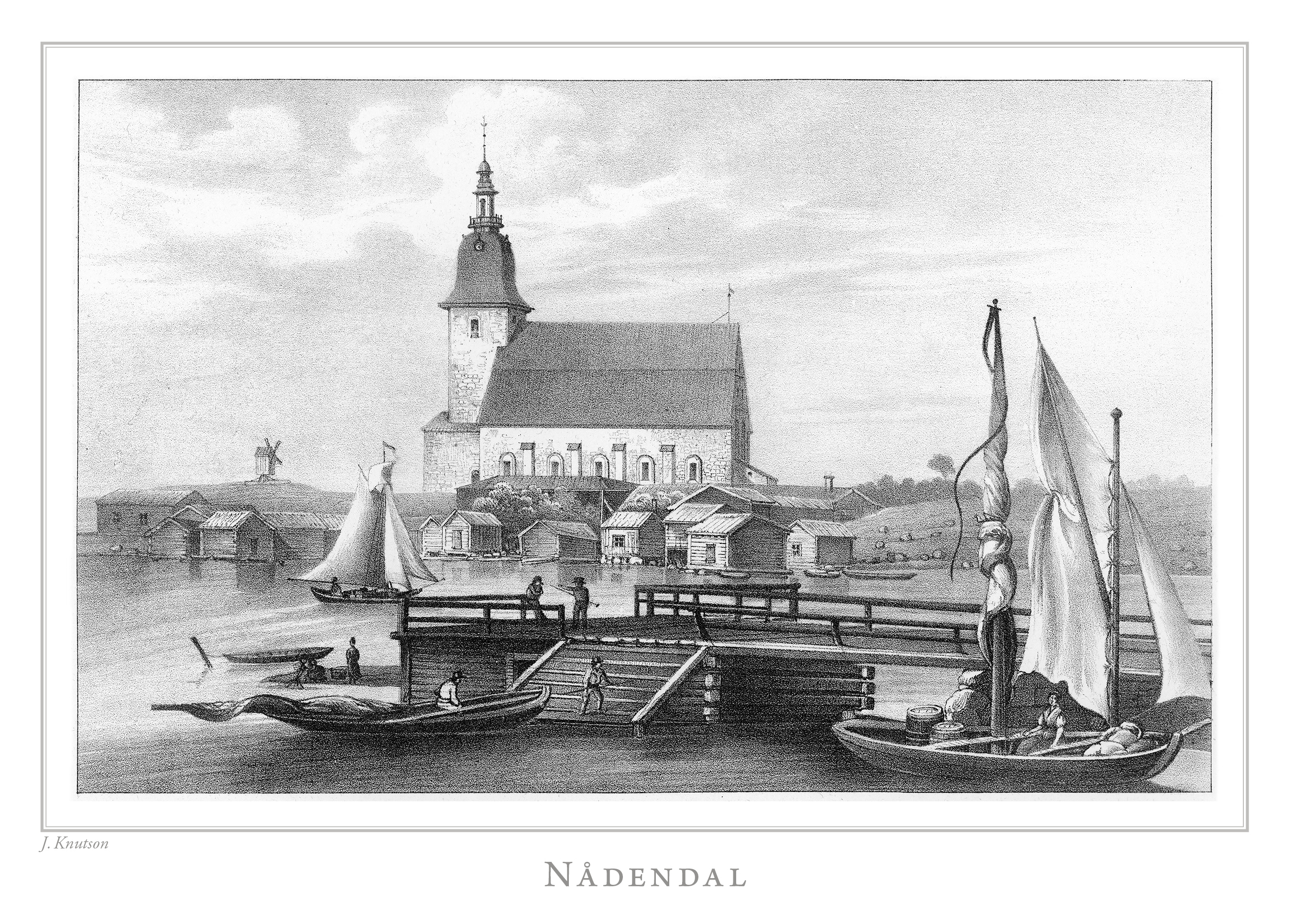
Lithograph of Nådendal Abbey by Johan Knutson published in Finland framstäldt i teckningar (1845-1852)

Nådendal Abbey (Finnish: Naantalin luostari; Swedish: Nådendals kloster), was a Bridgettine abbey in then-Swedish Finland, in operation from 1438 to 1591. The abbey was first situated in Masku, secondly in Perniö (1441) and finally in Naantali in 1443. It was one of six monasteries in Finland during the Middle Ages, and, as a double monastery, the only one which accepted women.

== History ==
Nådendal Abbey was dedicated to Saint Bridget, Saint Anna, John the Baptist and the Virgin Mary. Initially, the convent struggled with some problems, because the spots chosen for it was deemed insufficient, but in 1443, a suitable spot was finally chosen and the establishment was given some stability. As the first convent for women in Finland, it was somewhat of a novelty.

During the 15th-century, it was given many privileges from the crown as well as plenty of private donations, normally in the form of the income from numerous farms, and became a well-off abbey. In the 1490s, however, the convent experienced an economic crisis because the ongoing harsh winters, plague and bad harvests had decreased the revenue from the farms owned by the convent, a crisis which the convent does not seem to have recovered from fully.

During the Swedish Reformation, the convent was placed under pressure. The reformation allowed for the donors, or the families of former donors, to retract all donations made to convents, which placed all convents at financial risk, as many used this retraction right, which drained the abbey of its assets. Additionally, the convents were banned from accepting new members, and the existing were allowed to leave if they wished, an opportunity used by several members. In 1530, the abbess Valborg Fleming appealed directly to Gustav I of Sweden, and successfully asked for the convent to keep the property it owned upon its foundation from confiscation: she was in fact also granted two estates more for the abbey's upkeep. This saved (if only temporarily) the convent financially and made it possible to support their members.

In 1554, the church silver was confiscated and the abbey was visited by the Lutheran Bishop Mikael Agricola, at which time its members was required to promise to become "evangelical Christians", i.e., Lutherans, to refrain from venerating the saints and reading the revelations of Saint Bridget in public.

In 1556, the estates and assets of the abbey were confiscated, but the remaining members of the monastic community were allowed a royal pension. They were also given donations by private sympathizers, such as Anna Hogenskild.

The last recognized Abbess, Birgitta Knutsdotter, died in 1577. By then, there were only four nuns and one monk left. The last nun, Elin Knutsdotter, was granted an allowance in 1584 and died in 1591.

=== Abbesses ===
- Katarina Bengtsdotter (1440–1445)
- Margareta Arvidsdotter (–1457)
- Birgitta Bengtsdotter (1464)
- Lucia Olofsdotter Skelge (d. 1498)
- Katarina Johannis (1504)
- Margit Jönsdotter (1509)
- Valborg Joakimsdotter Fleming (1526–1531)
- Valborg Torkilsdotter (1536–1549)
- Birgitta Pedersdotter (1549–1565)
- Anna Nilsdotter (1565)
- Birgitta Knutsdotter Kurck (1568–1577)
- Elin Knutsdotter (–1591)

== See also ==
- List of Christian religious houses in Finland
