= Marienbrunn Abbey =

Marienbrunn Abbey also called Fons Mariae and Triumphus Marie was a double convent for women and men of the order of the Bridgettines, situated in Gdańsk between 1391 and 1833. It was the first convent of the order founded outside of Sweden, and the second convent of the order altogether.

== History ==
In 1373, the relics of Saint Bridget was brought home to Sweden from Rome by way of Gdańsk, after which the mother convent Vadstena Abbey was founded in Sweden. In 1391, there was a community of monks of the Bridgettine order in Gdańsk, and in 1397, the Marienbrunn Abbey was formally founded. It was the first founded after the mother convent in Sweden, and one of two in Poland (the other being active in Lublin in 1416 – 18th-century).

The Marienbrunn Abbey was a double monastery with both monks and nuns. The monks were the original founders, and the female members were initially reformed prostitutes, who entered the convent in a wish to leave their old life, a fact which initially gave the convent a bad name. In 1429, when complaints were made that female prostitutes were allowed to visit the abbey as guests, the abbess founded a separate guest house specially for women prostitutes.

In 1595, Vadstena Abbey was finally closed in Sweden, over half a century after the Swedish Reformation, and in the spring of 1596, the last nuns from the mother convent emigrated to Marienbrunn Abbey led by their abbess, Katarina Olofsdotter. Katarina Olofsdotter died here in 1625, and the last of the Swedish nuns, Anna Larsdotter, died in 1638.

Marienbrunn Abbey, as well as Gdańsk, became a part of the Kingdom of Prussia after the Partition of Poland in the 18th century. In 1833, the abbey was ordered closed down by the Prussian authorities.
