= Christina Nilsdotter =

Swedish singer (d 1399)

Christina Nilsdotter (died 1399) was a Swedish singer and song teacher. She was a member of the Bridgettine Order in Vadstena Abbey and well known as an artist for her ability and talent.

Christina Nilsdotter was a student under magister Petrus Olavi, the first general confessor of the male members of the order at Vadstena, and her predecessor, the song teacher and priest Ketilmundus, who had been the leader of the nuns' chorus at Vadstena before she was appointed as his successor. Christina was greatly praised: the nuns reportedly admired her so much that they wished to die during the morning song, and one nun, Ingeborg, was envied when she actually did. The nuns' chorus also performed for guests of the abbey, among the nobility and royalty.

Christina Nilsdotter was also appointed to the post of prioress, where she is said to have been very firm in advocating the rules.
