= Erik Fleming (councilor) =

Swedish-Speaking Finnish noble and politician (1487–1548)

Erik Joakimsson Fleming (1487–1548) was a Swedish-speaking Finnish noble, a Councilor of State of Sweden and an admiral. He was a prominent statesman and King Gustav Vasa's favourite. He was the king's trusted official in Swedish Finland.

Fleming was son of the riksråd nobleman Joakim Fleming and Elin Björnsdotter of Svidja, and the brother of abbess Valborg Fleming and Ivar Fleming: he was a grandson of Björn Ragvaldsson's. Erik Fleming's son was Admiral Klaus Fleming and his daughter was Filippa Fleming, who succeeded in writing a will disinheriting her brother for his neglect of her in a long illness, an unusual legal achievement at that time.

From 1512, he had a number of offices within the government administration in Finland. In 1523, him and his brother was named riksråd by king Gustav, and came to be his trusted representatives in Finland, then a Swedish province.

== Sources ==
- Erik Fleming i Svenskt biografiskt lexikon
