= Catherine Karlsdotter =

Queen of Sweden from 1448 to 1450

Catherine

Queen consort of Sweden and Norway
- Tenure: 1448–1450
- Coronation: 2 July 1448
- Died: 7 September 1450; Stockholm, Sweden
- Burial: Vadstena Abbey
- Spouse: Karl Knutsson
- Issue: Margareta Karlsdotter (Bonde); Magdalena Karlsdotter (Bonde); Birgitta Karlsdotter
- House: Gumsehufvud
- Father: Karl Ormsson (Gumsehuvud)

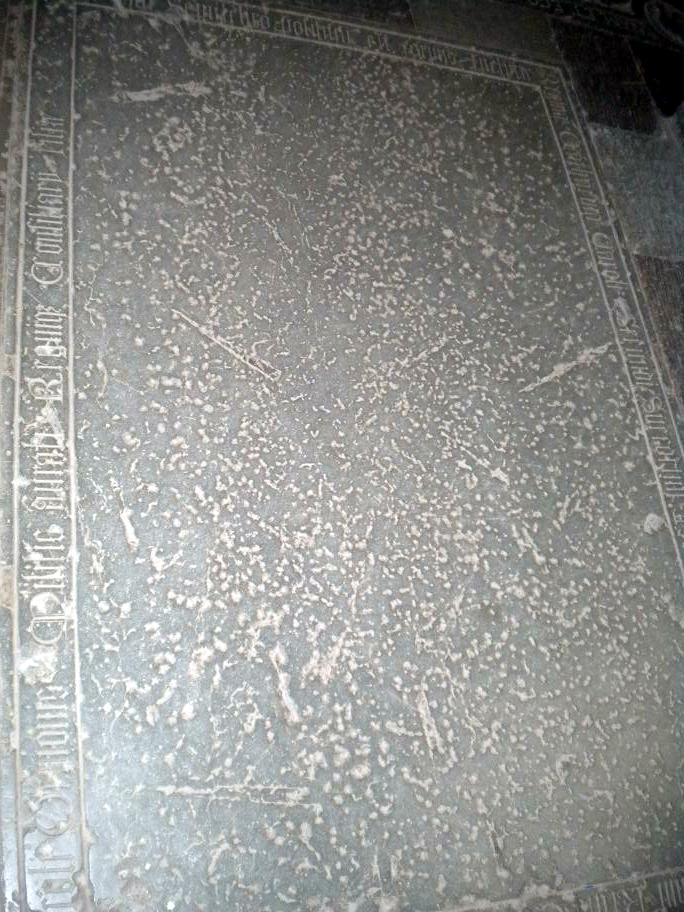
Catherine's grave at Vadstena

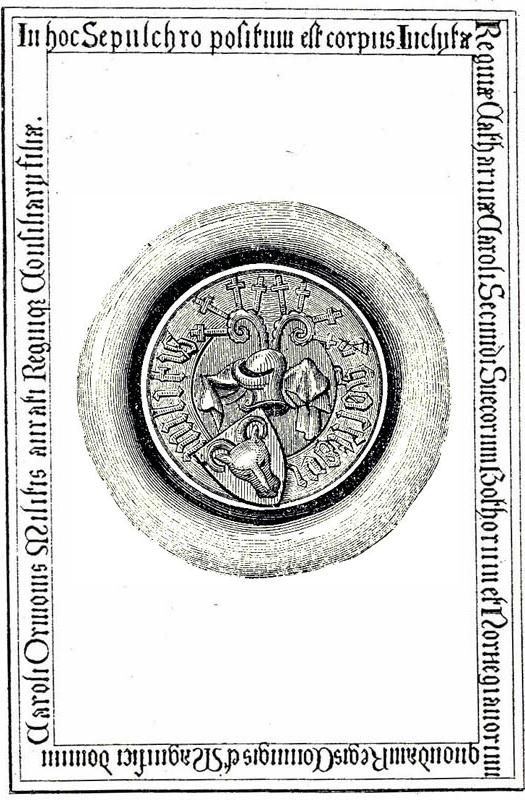
The tomb of Catherine in Vadstena in a drawing from 1820 where the Gumsehuvud coat of arms has been superimposed later.

Catherine Karlsdotter, in Swedish called Katarina Karlsdotter and later Katarina Gumsehuvud (died 7 September 1450) was Queen of Sweden from 1448 to 1450 and Queen of Norway from 1449 to 1450 as the second wife of King Karl Knutsson.

== Biography ==
Catherine was the daughter of the nobleman Karl Ormsson (Gumsehuvud). She married the Regent (and then widower) Karl Knutsson on 5 October 1438, when she became first lady and functioned as Queen in a ceremonial sense until 1440, when her husband was replaced as regent. Before their marriage, dispensation was obtained from the Pope, as Catherine was related to Karl's first wife. This was to ensure that children born in the marriage would be regarded as legitimate.

In 1448, her spouse became regent again and then was crowned King. She was crowned Queen of Sweden in Uppsala Cathedral on 2 July 1448. The next year, her husband became King of Norway also, making her Queen of Norway. The marriage is described as very happy and resulted in nine children. It was said that "Their relationship had always been of the best kind". Their second daughter, Magdalene, married Ivar Axelsson (Tott), an uncle of Ingeborg Tott.

Historical accounts describe Queen Catherine as beautiful and cheerful, noting that she created a nice environment and a relaxed atmosphere at court, and she was forthcoming to those who came seeking audience.

In 1450, she became one of many who died of the plague in Stockholm, and was deeply mourned by the king. She was buried in 1451 in Vadstena Abbey.

== Children ==
- Margaret Karlsdotter (Bonde) (1442–1462)
- Magdalen Karlsdotter (Bonde) (1445–1495), married to noble Ivar Axelsson (Tott) 1466
- Richeza Karlsdotter (Bonde) (born ca. 1445) nun at Vadstena Abbey.
- Bridget Karlsdotter (Bonde) (1446–1469) nun at Vadstena Abbey.
- four sons died early

Catherine Karlsdotter Born: c. 1400 Died: 1450
Royal titles
Preceded by Dorothea of Brandenburg	Queen consort of Norway; 1449–1450	Succeeded by Dorothea of Brandenburg
Preceded by Dorothea of Brandenburg	Queen consort of Sweden; 1448–1450	Succeeded by Dorothea of Brandenburg
