= Karin Johansdotter =

Swedish Roman Catholic nun

Karin Johansdotter (died after 1605), was a Swedish Roman Catholic nun of the Bridgettine Order. She was the last nun in Sweden after the Swedish Reformation.

== Life ==
Karin Johansdotter joined the Vadstena Abbey at an unknown year. She was still of childbearing age in 1605, and is thus likely to have joined the Vadstena Abbey during the reign of John III of Sweden or Sigismund III Wasa, when Sweden leaned toward a Counter-Reformation, and the Abbey was allowed to receive novices again: the last novice was accepted to the Abbey as late as 1593.

=== Closure of convent ===
In 1593, however, the Uppsala Synod proclaimed Lutheranism as state religion in Sweden, provoking a conflict between the Catholic king Sigismund and his Protestant uncle Duke Charles during the Swedish-Polish personal union, and initiating a development toward the War against Sigismund, resulting in the final completion of the Swedish Reformation.

In 1594, following the Uppsala Synod, Duke Charles and Bishop Abraham Angermannus visited the Vadstena Abbey, ordering the closure of the Abbey and demanding that the nuns handing over the valuables and convert to Lutheranism, both of which they refused. The following year, in 1595, the Abbess Katarina Olofsdotter and some of the nuns left Vadstena Abbey for Söderköping before departing to the Marienbrunn Abbey in Danzig, which was a daughter-convent to Vadstena. The Vadstena Abbey was thereby closed, as the last Catholic convent in Sweden to be closed after the Reformation, completing the Suppression of the Monasteries.

Contemporary documents list the members of the convent at the time of the closure in 1595, as well as what happened to them: except for the abbess Katarina Olsdotter herself, her deputy Elin Eriksdotter, as well as the sisters Ingrid Jansdotter, Ingrid Persdotter, Ingeborg Persdotter and Margaretha Mattsdotter was listed as having accompanied her to Danzig. Of the nuns listed as remaining in Sweden, three were listed as have been housed with private benefactors: Kerstin Persdotter "left with Lars Jönsson", Margreta Jacobsdotter "left with Jon Larsson" and Anna Larsdotter "left with Daniel Hansson". Of them, one was reportedly employed in the household of the Duchess Christina, while another one married a courtier of Duke Charles. Only two of the nuns were allowed to remain in the Abbey buildings after the closure of the convent: Ingegerd Månsdotter, who was listed as "old", and Karin Johansdotter, who was listed as "remaining" with her, evidently to take care of the elderly Ingegerd Månsdotter. They were allowed to remain in the building of the former convent with fourteen servants, who were to maintain the buildings and gardens for the crown, as the convent was now crown property. Ingegerd Månsdotter died during an unknown date. Karin Johansdotter officially employed as a gardener and caretaker of gardens of the former Abbey. After the death of Ingegerd Månsdotter, she was the only Catholic nun remaining in Sweden.

=== Later life ===
In March 1605, Karin Johansdotter was charged with the theft of clothes and objects of brass and yin from the sealed stores of the Abbey, which was by then crown property. She pleaded guilty as charged, and confessed to have broken into the stores by climbing in through a window near the roof. This was a serious crime at the time, but Karin Johansdotter was evidently a popular person among the inhabitants of Vadstena, and a "Public petition" demanded that she be given a light sentence. As she was also the mother of an infant, the verdict was therefore mitigated to the loss of her employment and banishment from Vadstena and the province of Östergötland.
