= Magdalena of Sweden =

Swedish princess (1445–1495)

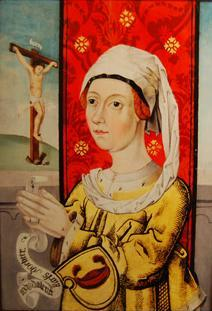
- Born: 1445
- Died: August 1495 (aged 49–50)
- Spouse: Ivar Axelsson Tott (m. 1466)
Names
- Magdalena Karlsdotter Bonde
- House: Bonde
- Father: Karl Knutsson
- Mother: Catherine of Bjurum

Magdalena of Sweden (Magdalena Karlsdotter Bonde; 1445 – August 1495) was a Swedish princess. She was the daughter of King Karl Knutsson and his first queen consort, Catherine Karlsdotter. In 1468–1470, her spouse Ivar Axelsson (Tott) was the promised successor of her father as regent.

== Biography ==
Magdalena was one of Karl's nine children, most of whom died in infancy. Her father became King of Sweden in 1448 and King of Norway in 1449. She married the nobleman Ivar Axelsson (Tott) in Nyköping on 21 September 1466. Her spouse was the uncle of Ingeborg Tott, the spouse of regent Sten Sture the Elder. The marriage between Magdalena and Ivar was childless.

Ivar was a former royal councillor in Denmark, having lived in Sweden since 1464, and after his marriage to Magdalena, he was made royal councillor of Sweden. In 1468, he was made de facto co-regent, and was promised to succeed his father-in-law after his death as interim regent, presiding over the council until the election of a new regent or monarch. He was described as "The most powerful man in Scandinavia". In 1470, King Karl married his mistress Christina Abrahamsdotter and legitimised his young son with her, Karl Karlsson, who was expected to be elected king after him.

Upon Karl's death in 1470, Ivar was not given enough support to become regent for Karl's five-year-old son, Magdalena's half-brother Prince Karl Karlsson, who soon was outmaneuvered as well by Sten Sture. By 1472, it was clear that the Bonde dynasty would not survive on the throne, and Ivar was given Stegeborg as a fief. Ivar betrayed Sweden, admitting in 1476 that he was promised Gotland as a fief by the Danish king. In 1481, an open conflict occurred between Ivar and Regent Sten.

Ivar was deemed as a traitor to Sweden, upon which Princess Magdalena, by order of Erik Oxenstierna at the council of Vadstena, was abducted and kept hostage by the enemies of her spouse. When she was released, the couple left to settle on Visborg Castle in Gotland. Upon her release, Ivar had Magdalena painted; her portrait is one of the oldest portraits paintings of its kind preserved in Sweden. In 1487, the couple was forced to leave Gotland by order of John, King of Denmark. Magdalena was widowed later that same year.

Magdalena was the benefactor of the Grey Friar's Abbey on Riddarholmen in Stockholm, to which she made many donations. She was honoured by the Grey Friar's Abbey with the inscription Propentissima Benefactrix Ordinis Nostri. She died in Söderköping and was buried in the Grey Friar's Abbey there, of which few visible ruins remain.

== References and literature ==
- Magdalena Bonde (Karlsdotter)
- Larsson, Lars-Olof, Kalmarunionens tid: från drottning Margareta till Kristian II, Rabén Prisma, Stockholm, 1997
- Harrison, Dick, Karl Knutsson: en biografi, Historiska media, Lund, 2002
- Berg, P. G. & Stålberg, Wilhelmina (red.), Anteckningar om svenska qvinnor, P. G. Berg, Stockholm, 1864-1866 https://urn.kb.se/resolve?urn=urn:nbn:se:kb:dig-3098048
- Nordisk familjebok
