= Slat =

Slat, slats, or SLAT may refer to:

== Common uses ==
- Leading-edge slat, an aerodynamic surface on the leading edge of the wing of a fixed-wing aircraft
- Lath, a narrow strip of straight-grained wood used under roof shingles or tiles
- Vertical or horizontal pieces of a window blind

== Arts and entertainment ==
- A character in the American comic strip Abbie an' Slats
- Slats Grobnik, a character created by American newspaper columnist Mike Royko
- Slats (1919–1936), a Leo the Lion mascot of MGM

== People ==
- Slats Jordan (1878–1953), American baseball player
- Slats Gill (1901–1966), American basketball and baseball head coach
- Glenn Hardin (1910–1975), or Slats, American hurdler, 1936 Olympic gold medalist
- Slats Long (1906–1964), American jazz clarinetist
- Connie Mack (1862–1956), or Slats, American baseball player, manager, and team owner
- Max Zaslofsky (1925–1985), or Slats, American basketball player
- Glen Sather (born 1943), or Slats, Canadian ice hockey player
- Michael Slater (born 1970), or Slats, Australian cricketer
- Boyan Slat (born 1994), Dutch inventor and entrepreneur

== Science and technology ==
- AQM-127 SLAT (Supersonic Low-Altitude Target), a United States Navy target drone
- Systeme de Lutte Anti-Torpille, a naval anti-torpedo system, on FREMM multipurpose frigate
- Second Level Address Translation, a computer technology
- Software Liberty Association of Taiwan, a member of the Free Standards Group
- Super Low Altitude Test Satellite, a Japanese satellite

== Other uses ==
- Slat, Kentucky, United States, an unincorporated community
- A rarely used alternate name for a slash (/)

== See also ==
- Plank (disambiguation)
- Slet (disambiguation)
- Slit (disambiguation)
- Slot (disambiguation)
- Slut (disambiguation)
