= Slit =

Slit or SLIT may refer to:

== Science and technology ==
- Slit (protein), in genetics, the midline repellent signaling molecule
- Slitting, a shearing operation that cuts a large roll of material into narrower rolls
- Sublingual immunotherapy (SLIT), immunotherapy that involves putting allergen extracts under the tongue

== Other uses ==
- Slit trench, a defensive fighting position in warfare
- Slit Woods, a Site of Special Scientific Interest in County Durham, England
- Arrowslit or loophole, a defensive slot in the wall of a building that allows archers to fire at invaders if the building is threatened

== See also ==
- Slit experiment (disambiguation)
- Caso Degollados ('Slit-Throat Case'), a Chilean politically-motivated series of murders
- Slat (disambiguation)
- Slot (disambiguation)
- Slut (disambiguation)
- Silt (disambiguation)
