= Slot =

Slot, the slot or Slots may refer to:

== People ==
- Slot (surname)
- Jørgen Slots, a Danish-born periodontist in the US
- Margareta Slots (died 1669), Dutch-born mistress of Gustav II Adolf of Sweden

== Arts, entertainment, and media ==
- Slot (band), a Russian alternative/nu metal band
- St. Laurence O'Toole Pipe Band, a pipe band based in Dublin, Ireland (abbreviated "Slot")
- Dance slot, an imaginary narrow rectangle along which a follower moves back and forth with respect to the leader
- The Slot (TV series), an Australian television series

== Sport ==
- Slot (ice hockey), the area on the hockey rink directly ahead of the goaltender between the faceoff circles on each side
- Slot, a space within a formation during a game of American football; see Glossary of American football

== Technology ==
- Signals and slots, language construct used to simplify observer pattern implementations in signal programming and especially GUI design
- Slot (computer architecture), the operation issue and data path machinery associated with a single execute pipeline in a CPU
- Expansion slot, portion of a computer mother board that can receive an expansion card
- Kensington Security Slot, a small hole found on almost all recent small or portable computer and electronics equipment used for attaching a lock
- Leading-edge slot, a fixed aerodynamic feature of the wing of some aircraft to reduce the stall speed
- Slot antenna, a directional antenna consisting of a slot in a piece of metal

== Other uses ==
- Airport slot, a right allocated to an airline by an airport or government agency to schedule a landing or departure at a specific time
- Train slot, a license allocated to a rail transport company
- Mail slot or letter box, a receptacle for receiving incoming mail
- Orbital slot, an allotted position for a satellite in a "crowded" orbit
- Slot machine, a type of casino game
- Slot man or The slot, slang term for the chief copy editor on a newspaper
- Universality slot, quota system used at the Olympics
- New Georgia Sound, a sound in the Solomon Islands known as "the Slot" to Allied combatants during World War II
- The Slot, a gay hotel and sex club featured in the Folsom Street Fair in San Francisco

== See also ==
- Groove (engineering), a feature cut into a hard material to provide a location for another component
- Hole (disambiguation)
- Slat (disambiguation)
- Slet (disambiguation)
- Slit (disambiguation)
- Slut (disambiguation)
- Tongue and groove, a type of joinery employing slots and interlocking ridges cut into material
