= Henrietta Polyxena of Vasaborg =

Henrietta Polyxena of Vasaborg (1696–1777) was a Swedish countess. She was the last member of the House of Vasaborg

Henrietta Polyxena was the daughter of count Gustaf Adolf of Vasaborg and Angelica Catharina von Leiningen-Westerburg, and the paternal granddaughter of Gustav of Vasaborg, illegitimate son of king Gustavus Adolphus of Sweden. Her family had been living in Germany since 1652.

Henrietta never married, and became known for her love affairs. She was known to have been "involved in numerous love adventures, as young for her own account, as old on the account of others, by which she was eventually degraded to utter poverty and contempt".

In 1776, the Geheimrat of Cologne, Baron Münster, applied to Gustav III of Sweden on her behalf. By that time, she was living in deepest poverty in the village Huntlosen in Niedersachsen in Germany, blind, sick and destitute and on the charity of the poor villagers. Gustav III sent her a sum of 500 ducat, addressed her as cousin and gave her a pension. She died the following year.
