= Christina of Vasaborg =

Christina of Vasaborg (1644–1709) was the eldest child of Gustav of Vasaborg, Count of Nystad, and a granddaughter of King Gustavus Adolphus of Sweden.

On 21 February 1665 she married in Stockholm Volmar Wrangel, Baron (Friherre) of Lindeberg, (1641–1675).

She died on 9 September 1709 at Dorpat (Tartu), in Swedish Estonia.
