= Kenneth Davis (basketball) =

American former basketball player

Kenny Davis
Personal information
- Born: September 12, 1948 (age 78) Slat, Kentucky, U.S.
- Listed height: 5 ft 11 in (1.80 m)
- Listed weight: 181 lb (82 kg)

Career information
- High school: Wayne County (Monticello, Kentucky)
- College: Georgetown (Kentucky) (1967–1971)
- NBA draft: 1971: 11th round, 181st overall pick
- Drafted by: New York Knicks
- Position: Point guard

Career highlights
- 2× First-team NAIA All-American (1970, 1971)
- Stats at Basketball Reference
Medals
Men's basketball
Representing United States
Olympic Games
Silver medal – second place	1972 Munich	Team

Kenneth Bryan Davis (born September 12, 1948) is an American former basketball player.

Davis was born in Slat, Kentucky. After his collegiate career as a small college All-American at Georgetown College, where he was a member of Kappa Alpha Order, and a short stint with the Marathon Oil AAU team, Davis was named Captain of the U.S. national team in the 1972 Olympics. In the aftermath of the controversial finish to the gold medal game in which the final three seconds were replayed three times for unclear reasons, Davis famously led the United States team in a refusal to accept the silver medal and has a provision in his will that neither his wife nor children may accept the medal after his death. After his basketball career ended, Davis became and still is a sales representative for Converse (39 years) and also is a noted motivational speaker residing in Garrard County, Kentucky.

Davis was drafted by the New York Knicks in the eleventh round of the 1971 NBA draft. He never played professionally, however.
