= Plank =

Plank or The Plank may refer to:

- Plank (wood), flat, elongated, and rectangular timber with parallel faces
- Plank (exercise), an isometric exercise for the abdominal muscles

== Arts and entertainment ==
- The Plank (1967 film), a British comedy short film with no dialogue
- The Plank (1979 film), a remake of the 1967 film
- Plank, a character in Ed, Edd n Eddy

== People ==
- Alex Plank (born 1986), American autism advocate
- Conny Plank (1940−1987), German record producer and musician
- Doug Plank (born 1953), American football player
- Ed Plank (born 1952), American baseball pitcher in the late 1970s
- Eddie Plank (1875−1926), early 20th-century American baseball player
- Jolanda Plank (born 1958), Italian alpine skier
- Liz Plank (born 1987), Canadian author and journalist
- Ewart G. Plank (1897−1982), American general
- Heinz Plank (born 1945), German painter, draughtsman and graphic artist
- Kevin Plank (born 1972), American businessman and philanthropist
- Peter "Plank" Clements, guitar technician for Radiohead
- Raymond Plank (1922−2018), American businessman

== Other uses ==
- Plank post office, alongside Martins Creek (Kentucky) 1906–1992
- Plank (party platform), a component of a political party program
- Plank Township, Keokuk County, Iowa
- Plank, also known as a skid block for a attachment to the underside of a racing car

== See also ==
- Planck (disambiguation)
- Planking (disambiguation)
- Slats (disambiguation)
- Walk the Plank (disambiguation)
  - Walking the plank, form of execution associated with pirates
- Plank house, homes of indigenous people of the Pacific Northwest
- American historic carpentry
- Tychonoff plank, a topological space in mathematics
