= Waldemar von Wrangel =

Swedish baron and soldier

Waldemar Wrangel af Lindeberg (1641–1675) was a Swedish baron (Friherre) and soldier. He was the step-brother of Riksamiral Carl Gustaf Wrangel. Also known as "Wolmar", he was married to Kristina af Vasaborg, the daughter of an illegitimate son of Gustavus Adolphus of Sweden.

Wrangel began his military service at a young age. In the 1650s, as a Rittmeister ("captain") under Karl X Gustav, he took part in a campaign against Denmark. In the time when Karl XI was under age, Wrangel was a direct employee of the royal house. In 1665 he was appointed colonel in a regiment of horse, with which he participated in a campaign against Bremen. In 1667 he was promoted major general.

In the Swedish-Brandenburg War in 1674 he served as a lieutenant general together with his step-brother, who had been Reichsmarschall since 1664. In this war, Wolmar Wrangel was the third highest-ranking officer after the Reichsmarschall and Field Marshal Conrad Mardefelt. Because both the Reichsmarschall and Conrad Mardefelt could not discharge their responsibility on account of ill health, Wolmar Wrangel was de facto the commander-in-chief of the Swedish Army which was defeated in 1675 at the Battle of Fehrbellin.

== Sources ==
- Lexicon entry in the Nordisk familjebok (1876–1926) (in Swedish)
