= Wildeshausen =

- Town
- Coat of arms

- Location of Wildeshausen within Oldenburg district
- Interactive map of Wildeshausen
- Location within Germany Location within Lower Saxony
- Coordinates: 52°54′N 8°26′E
- Country: Germany
- State: Lower Saxony
- District: Oldenburg

Government
  - Mayor (2021–26): Jens Kuraschinski

Area
  - Total: 89.7 km^{2} (34.6 sq mi)
- Elevation: 19 m (62 ft)

Population (2025-12-31)
  - Total: 21,347
  - Density: 238/km^{2} (616/sq mi)
- Time zone: UTC+01:00 (CET)
  - Summer (DST): UTC+02:00 (CEST)
- Postal codes: 27793
- Dialling codes: 0 44 31
- Vehicle registration: OL
- Website: www.wildeshausen.de

Wildeshausen (German pronunciation: [vɪldəsˈhaʊzn̩]; Low Saxon: Wilshusen) is a town and the capital of the Oldenburg district in Lower Saxony, Germany. It is situated by the river Hunte.

== History ==
Under the 1648 Peace of Westphalia, which ended the Thirty Years’ War, Sweden acquired large territories in what is now Germany, including Pomerania, Wismar, Bremen-Verden, and Wildeshausen. While Bremen-Verden, Pomerania, and Wismar remained long-term Swedish dominions, Wildeshausen was only briefly under Swedish control.

The Swedish crown granted Wildeshausen to Count Gustav Gustavsson of Vasaborg, an illegitimate son of Gustavus II Adolphus and Margareta Slots, making him a half-brother of the Swedish Queen Kristina.

Gustav had served in the Swedish armed forces during the war and was ennobled as Vasaborg in 1637 (introduced at Riddarhuset in 1647). He also owned several estates in Finland. After receiving Wildeshausen, he moved to Germany and died in the city on 25 October 1653.

His son and successor, Gustav Adolf of Vasaborg, was only a few months old at the time of his father’s death. As an adult, he pursued a military career in Braunschweig-Lüneburg but lost Wildeshausen during the wars of the 1670s.

In 1679, under the Peace of Nijmegen, the Swedish crown ceded Wildeshausen to the Prince-Bishop of Münster, formally in exchange for a loan of 100,000 Riksdaler. The area was later mortgaged to Hanover in 1700. Nevertheless, Gustav Adolf continued to reside in the region and died in Wildeshausen in 1732.

== Attractions ==
There are stone monuments and old burial places dating to the third millennium BC. One of these areas, Kleinenkneter Steine, was reconstructed in the 1930s. The local Tourist Center, located in the old Rathaus (Town hall) has maps for tours and walks.

=== Kurpark ===
The Kurpark in Wildeshausen, designated as a Luftkurort (spa and fresh-air resort), features a fountain, a concert shell, and a wading pool. During the summer months, concerts are held every Sunday morning at 11 a.m.

On Pentecost Sunday (Pfingstsonntag), the Schützengilde, founded in 1403, hosts a traditional evening ceremony known as the Tattoo, featuring a fireworks display that marks the opening of the annual Gildefest.

=== St.Peter Church ===
An ecumenical ceremony on 27 November 1998 marked the reopening of St. Peter’s Church for worship. From 2 August 1997 until that date, the Roman Catholic community had been invited to use the Alexander Church, as St. Peter’s had been closed due to structural damage. The reconstruction took 16 months to complete.

Since 1699, the Alexander Church had been used for Evangelical Lutheran services, during a period when Sweden was the ruling power. The Catholic community acquired a house with several adjoining buildings and converted a barn into a church-like structure for worship.

Between 1700 and 1803, when Hanover ruled the region, Catholics were prohibited from building a new church. Only in 1810, when Oldenburg assumed control of Wildeshausen, were they granted freedom of religion. They built a new church, which was consecrated on 24 November 1811.

Due to structural flaws, the building was later deemed unsafe and had to be closed once more. In 1824, the current St. Peter’s Church was finally completed — initially without a tower, which was added in 1910.

The times of division between the religious communities are, thank God, over now.

— R. Gryczan and H. Holtmann

=== Marketplace ===
At the heart of Wildeshausen lies the marketplace. The pointed gables of the surrounding houses once faced the street, though many of the original wooden façades have since been replaced with stone.

The Marktbrunnen (Market Fountain) was built in 1747 by master craftsman Theophil of Bremen. It once provided drinking water for both people and animals.

Wildeshausen was situated along an old trade route. In pagan times, an Irmen Column (Irmen Säule) stood here. After the town was captured by Münster in 1529, Mayor Jakob Lickenberg was executed at this very spot. A stone near the Market Fountain commemorates his death.

In 1990, the town of Wildeshausen built a new town hall featuring a glockenspiel with moving figures.

=== Waltbert ===
On Westerstraße stands a sculpture of Waltbert. In the year 851, Waltbert — a grandson of Widukind — brought the relics of St. Alexander from Rome to Wildeshausen to promote Christianity in this sparsely populated region.

The sculpture depicts Waltbert on horseback, holding the relic of St. Alexander in his hands. Below the figure are inscribed his name, the year 851, and the Latin word “translatio.”

The “Translatio Alexandri”, the account of this event, was once recorded by the monks of Fulda.

=== Whitsun: "Gildefest" ===
A week-long festival, the "Gildfest", has occurred in Wildeshausen on Whitsun (German: Pfingsten) since 1403. The Mayor is the General of the Guild. The town director is the chief of protocol (Major). A related expression is: "The town of Wildeshausen is the "Schützengilde" and the Schützengilde is the town of Wildeshausen". A granite sculpture, called "cylinder", by A. Boldt represents the Schützengilde in the inner city.

=== Alexander Church ===
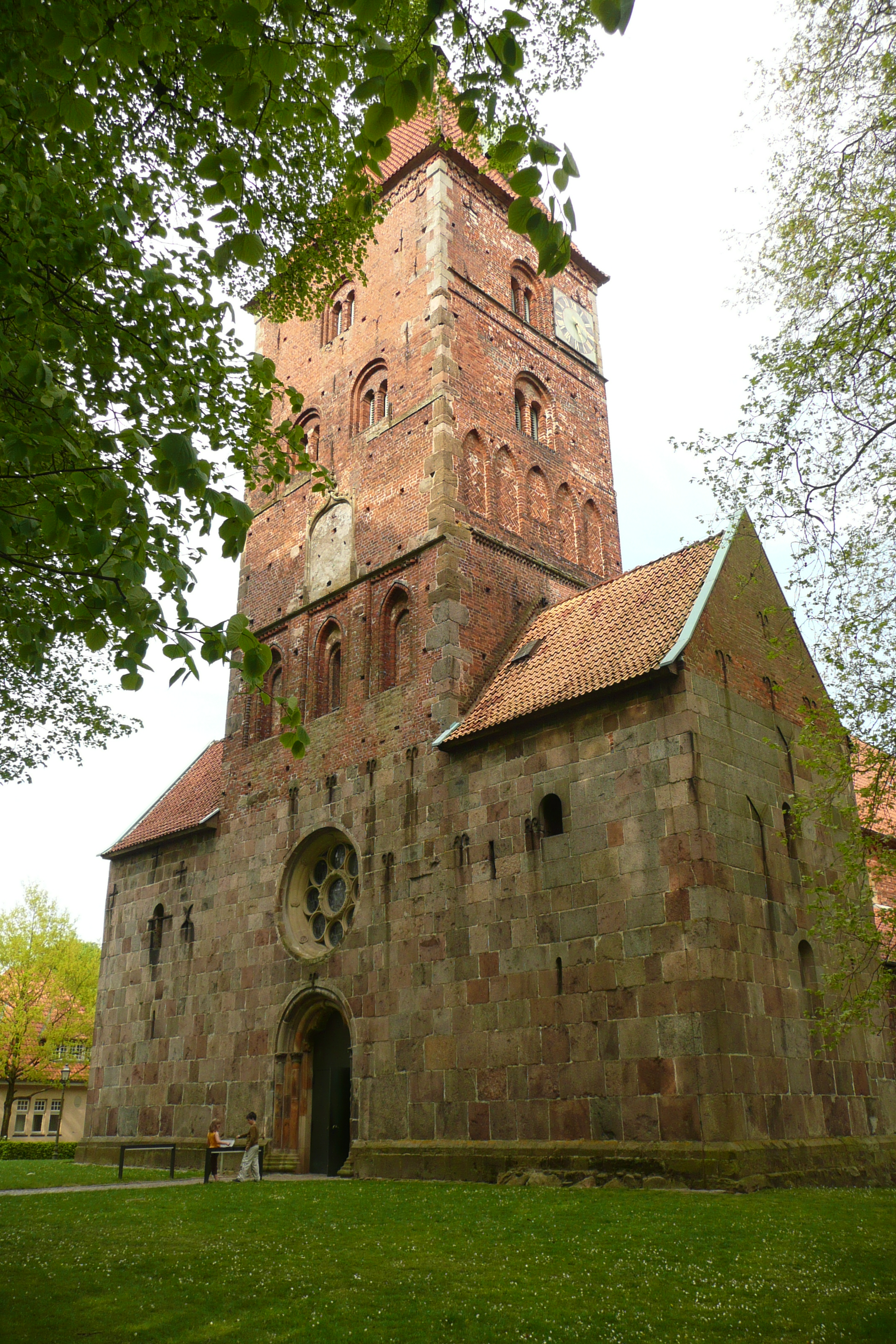
Alexander Church

The founding of the Alexander Church goes back to 814. In 807 Waltbert, a grandson of Duke Wittekind, brought the relics of the sainted Alexander from Rome by way of the Alpine mountains to Wildeshausen. Alexander died, as well as his mother and 6 brothers, as executed martyrs during the persecution of Christians in the first century. Waltbert donated a "Chorherren Stift" (a type of monastery, where the cleric lived to the rules of the Benedictines) named "Alexander Kapitel". It was to be used as a mission for the surrounding area (called Lerigau, or Largau). Wildeshausen became a place of pilgrimage, benefiting it economically. The Church and "Stift" owned treasures and were decorated with pictures. During renovation frescos were discovered. The Alexander Church is the only basilica in the area of Oldenburg. The style documents the transition from the late Roman to the early gothic style of the 13th century.

=== Pestruper Burial Ground ===
During the Bronze Age, when bronze replaced the hard-to-produce stone tools, the inhabitants of this area continued to live here. They began to bury their dead in designated burial grounds.

The Pestruper Burial Ground is the only preserved site of its kind in Europe. It is located about 800 meters from the River Hunte. Around 500 tombs of varying shapes and sizes provide evidence of a settlement that, around 600 B.C., buried urns containing the ashes of their dead there. For each individual urn, a small mound was built using sods of grass.

During the examination of the “King’s Tombs” (Königshügel), traces from the earlier Stone Age and ritual plough marks from the Bronze Age (1100–700 B.C.) were discovered.

The 'kings tombs' (Königshügel) consist of burials from different ages (late Bronze Age to pre-Roman Iron Age). The farmers, breeders, hunters and fishermen were contemporaries of "Ötzi" from the ice age.

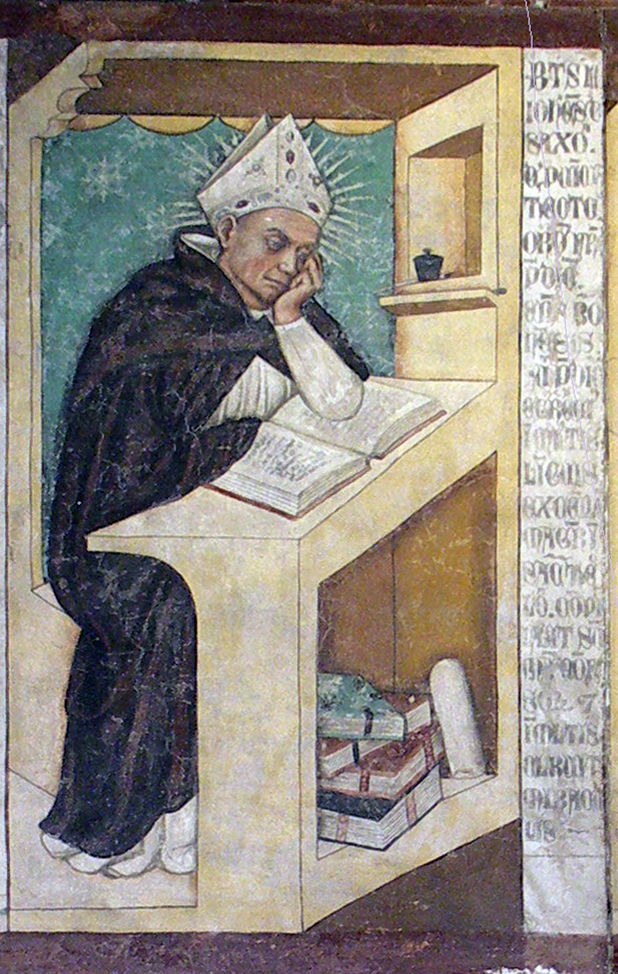
John of Wildeshausen

== Notable people ==
- John of Wildeshausen (ca 1180 – 1252), a Dominican friar, bishop of Bosnia and fourth master general of the Dominican Order.
- Reinhold Brinkmann (1934–2010), a German musicologist, he also taught at Harvard University
- Wigald Boning (born 1967), comedian, TV presenter, actor and author.

== International relations ==
Wildeshausen is twinned with:

- Hertford, United Kingdom
- Évron, France
