= Planck (disambiguation) =

Max Planck (1858–1947) was a German physicist considered to be the founder of quantum theory.

Planck may also refer to:

== Science ==
- Planck (crater), on the Moon
- Planck (spacecraft), a space observatory
- Planck units, in particle physics and physical cosmology

== People with the surname ==
- Amalia Planck (1834–1908), Swedish entrepreneur
- Erwin Planck (1893–1945), German politician and resistance fighter
- Gottlieb Jakob Planck (1751–1833), German theologian and historian and grandfather of Max Planck
- Karl Christian Planck (1819–1880), German philosopher
- Nina Planck (born 1971), American food writer

== See also ==
- Plank (disambiguation)
- Max Planck Society, for the Advancement of Science
