= Walk the Plank =

Walk the Plank may refer to:

- Walking the plank, a method of execution practiced by rogue seafarers
- Walk the Plank (game show), a South African television game show
- Walk the Plank (theatre company), an English pyrotechnics and theatre company
- Walk the Plank, a card game by Green Ronin Publishing

== Music ==
- Walk the Plank (Pirates of the Mississippi album), 1991
- Walk The Plank (Zebrahead album), 2015
- "Walk the Plank", song on the 1982 album Arias & Symphonies by Spoon
- "Walk the Plank", a song from the 2003 film soundtrack album Pirates of the Caribbean: The Curse of the Black Pearl
