= Vase (heraldry) =

Heraldic figure

A vase as canting arms of the Finnish city of Vaasa.

A vase (Swedish pronunciation: [ˈ̍vɑːsːɛ]) is a heraldic symbol that has been used by the Swedish and Polish-Lithuanian House of Vasa. It has been used as a symbol of the Swedish state even after the extinction of the Vasa lineage, and was reused in 1818 as part of the coat of arms of Sweden. The vase has been used by other families, both noble and common, and is still in use by the government-owned real estate enterprise Vasakronan.

The term originally referred to a bundle of twigs or branches and comes from the Old Swedish vasi and is related to vad ("seine").The term has been used in compounds such as risvase (a bundle of straw of twigs used to attract fish near shore) and stormvase ("fascine"). As a coat of arms the term vase has likely been used since the symbol has mostly resembled a fascine.

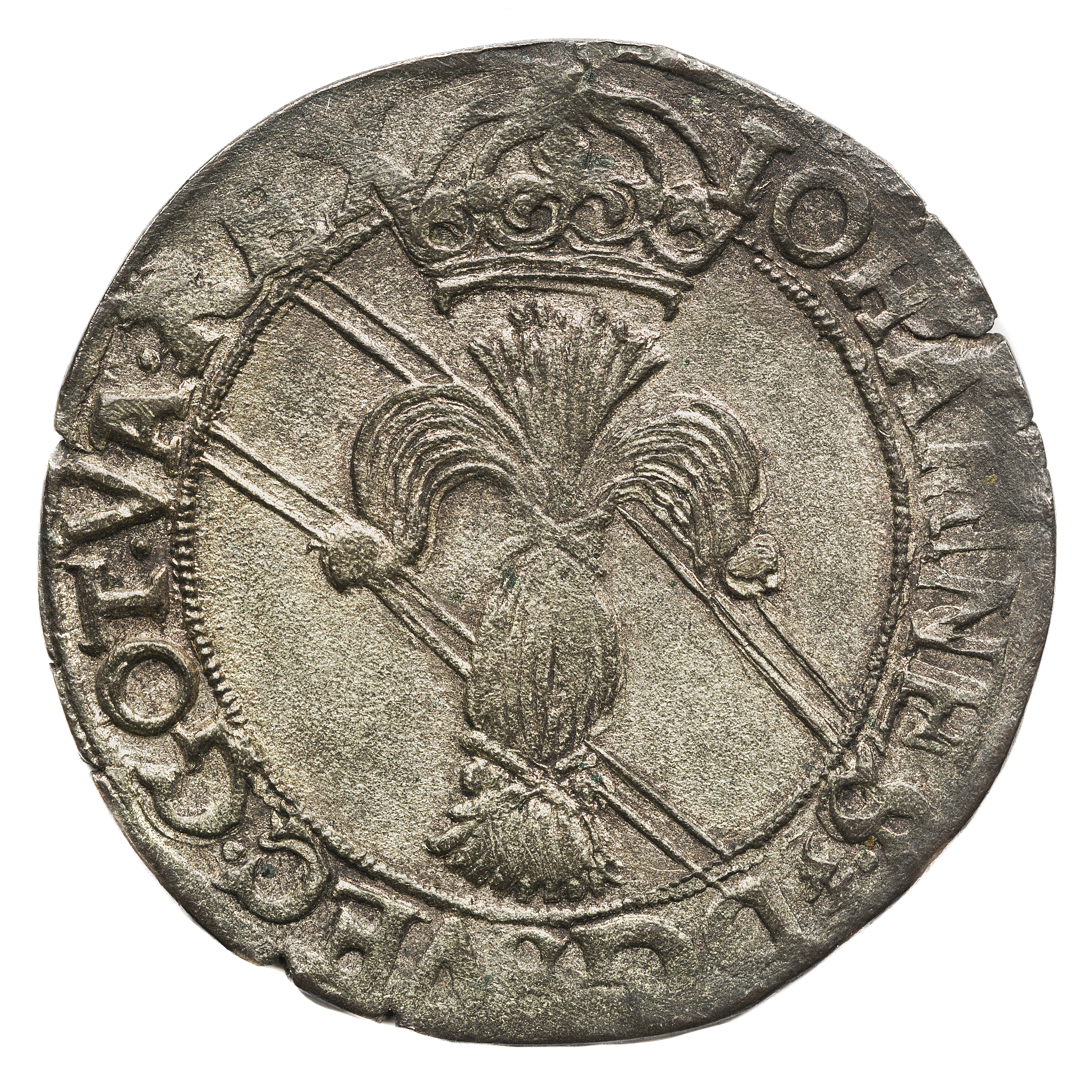
A mark from 1592.

The exact meaning of the heraldic symbol of the Vasa family has been debated among both historians and heralds. During the late 16th century, the vase was depicted to look more like a sheaf, while medieval depictions show a sort of bundle, and which possibly could have been a depiction of a type of anchor plate. In modern times, depictions of a vase as a sheaf are considered inaccurate. Due to its historical association with a sheaf, it has sometimes been called vasakärven, "the Vasa sheaf".

The vase was used as a nationalist symbol during the 1930s and 1940s, especially by fascist and Nazi groups in Sweden, such as the Swedish National Socialist Workers' Party (Svensk socialistisk samling) under Sven Olov Lindholm (1903–1998). The vase was also used as a party symbol by National Socialist Front which was active about 1984–2008. It was also used by democratic political organizations like Svenska Landsbygdens Kvinnoförbund, today Centerkvinnorna, the women's organization of the Centre Party.
