= House of Vasa =

Early modern royal house in Sweden

House of Vasa Vasaätten Wazowie Vazos
- Canting arms of Vasa, depicting a sheaf (the name Vasa is derived from the word "vase")
- Country: (yes) Sweden; Poland–Lithuania
- Founded: 1523
- Founder: Gustav I of Sweden
- Final ruler: Sweden: Christina (1632–1654), Poland and Lithuania: John II Casimir (1648–1668)
- Titles: King of Sweden (1523–1654); King of Poland (1587–1668); Grand Duke of Lithuania; Tsar of all Russia (1610–1613, uncrowned) (1613–1634, titular); Grand Duke of Finland
- Dissolution: 1672 (in agnatic line after death of John II Casimir)
- Deposition: Sweden: 1654 (abdication), Poland and Lithuania: 1668 (abdication)
- Cadet branches: Vasaborg (illegitimate)

The House of Vasa (Note: Swedish: Vasaätten; Finnish: Vaasa-suku; Polish: Wazowie; Lithuanian: Vazos.) was a royal house that was founded in 1523 in Sweden. Its members ruled the Kingdom of Sweden from 1523 to 1654 and the Polish–Lithuanian Commonwealth from 1587 to 1668. Its agnatic line became extinct with the death of King John II Casimir Vasa in 1672.

The Vasa dynasty descended from a 14th-century Swedish noble family, tracing agnatic kinship to Nils Kettilsson (d. 1378), the fogde of Tre Kronor Castle in Stockholm. Several members held high offices during the 15th century. In 1523, after the Stockholm bloodbath and the abolition of the Kalmar Union, Gustav Eriksson (Vasa) became King Gustav I of Sweden and the royal house was founded. His reign is sometimes referred to as the beginning of the modern Swedish state, which included the King's break with the Catholic Church during the Protestant Reformation and the foundation of the Church of Sweden.

However, his eldest son and successor Erik XIV of Sweden was overthrown by Gustav's younger son, King John III of Sweden. John III married a Catholic Polish-Lithuanian princess, Catherine Jagiellon, leading to the House of Vasa becoming rulers of Polish–Lithuanian Commonwealth.

Their Catholic son Sigismund III Vasa, then ruler of a short-lived Polish–Swedish union, was usurped in 1599 by John's Protestant brother King Charles IX of Sweden in the War against Sigismund. The dynasty was then split into a Protestant Swedish branch and a Catholic Polish-Lithuanian one, which contended for crowns in subsequent wars.

The involvement of the famous Protestant general and King Gustavus Adolphus of Sweden in the Thirty Years' War gave rise to the saying that he was the incarnation of "the Lion of the Midnight" (German: Der Löwe von Mitternacht). Yet, notably, his daughter and heiress Queen Christina of Sweden (1632–1654) abdicated in 1654 after converting to Catholicism, and emigrated to Rome, where she was hosted by the Papacy. In the Commonwealth, John II Casimir Vasa abdicated in 1668. With his death, the royal House of Vasa became extinct in 1672, though the current King of Sweden, Carl XVI Gustaf, is descended from Gustav I through his paternal great-grandmother, Victoria of Baden, a descendant of Gustav I's great-great-grandson Adolphus Frederick II, Duke of Mecklenburg-Strelitz.

== Kingdom of Sweden ==
=== Gustav I of Sweden ===
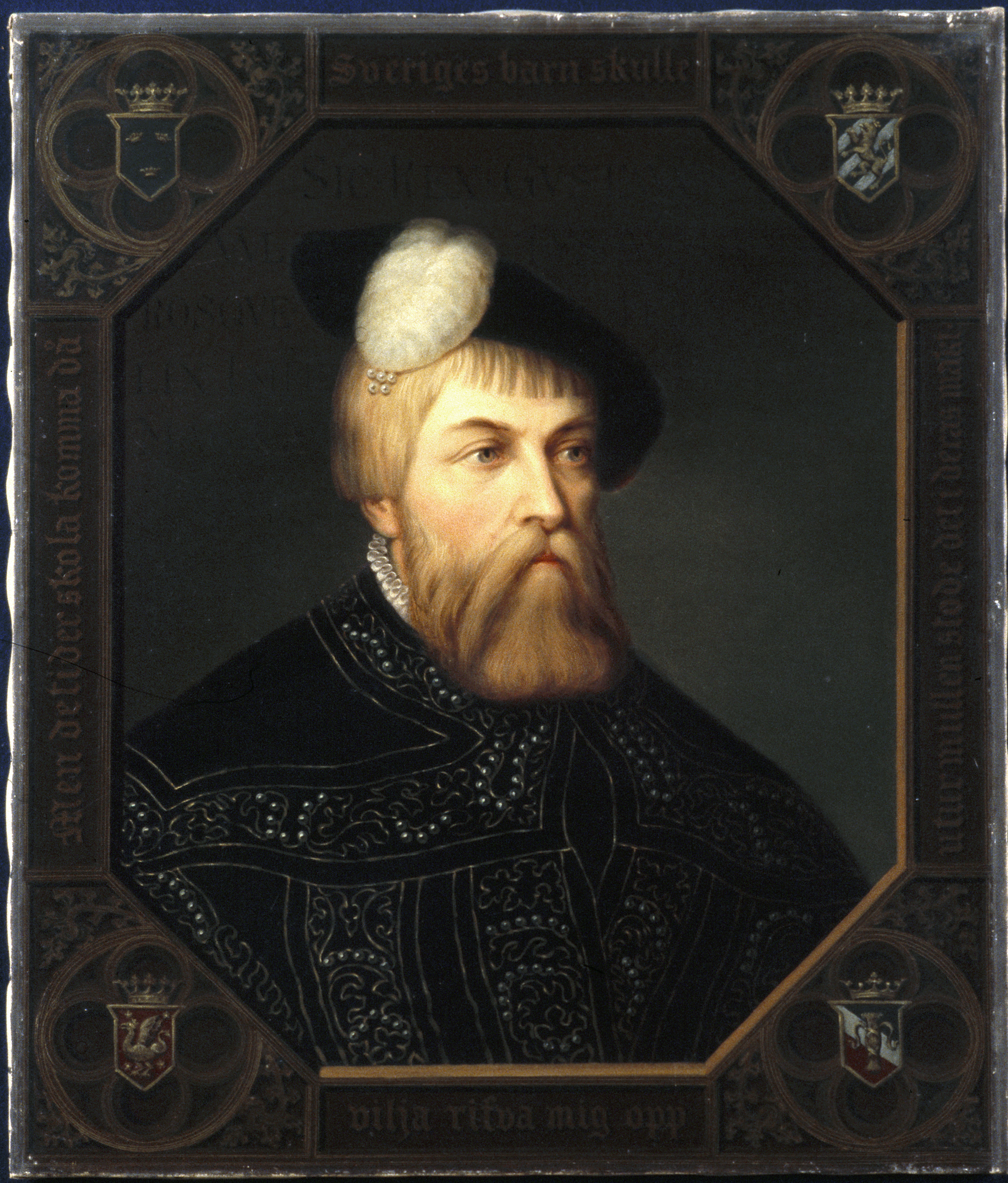
Portrait of Gustav I Vasa, Livrustkammaren, Stockholm

Gustav Eriksson, a son of Cecilia Månsdotter Eka and Erik Johansson Vasa, was probably born in 1496. The birth most likely took place in Rydboholm Castle, northeast of Stockholm, the manor house of the father, Erik. The newborn got his name, Gustav, from Erik's grandfather Gustav Anundsson. Since the end of the 14th century, Sweden had been a part of the Kalmar Union with Denmark and Norway. The Danish dominance in this union occasionally led to uprisings in Sweden. During Gustav's childhood, parts of the Swedish nobility has tried to make Sweden independent from the union. Gustav and his father Erik supported the party of Sten Sture the Younger, regent of Sweden from 1512, and its struggle against the Danish King Christian II. Following the battle of Brännkyrka in 1518, where Sten Sture's troops beat the Danish forces, it was decided that Sten Sture and King Christian would meet in Österhaninge for negotiations. To guarantee the safety of the king, the Swedish side sent six hostages to be kept by the Danes for as long as the negotiations lasted. However, Christian did not show up for the negotiations, violated the deal with the Swedish side, and took the hostages to Copenhagen. The six hostages were Hemming Gadh, Lars Siggesson (Sparre), Jöran Siggesson (Sparre), Olof Ryning, Bengt Nilsson (Färla) – and Gustav Eriksson.

==== Election as king ====
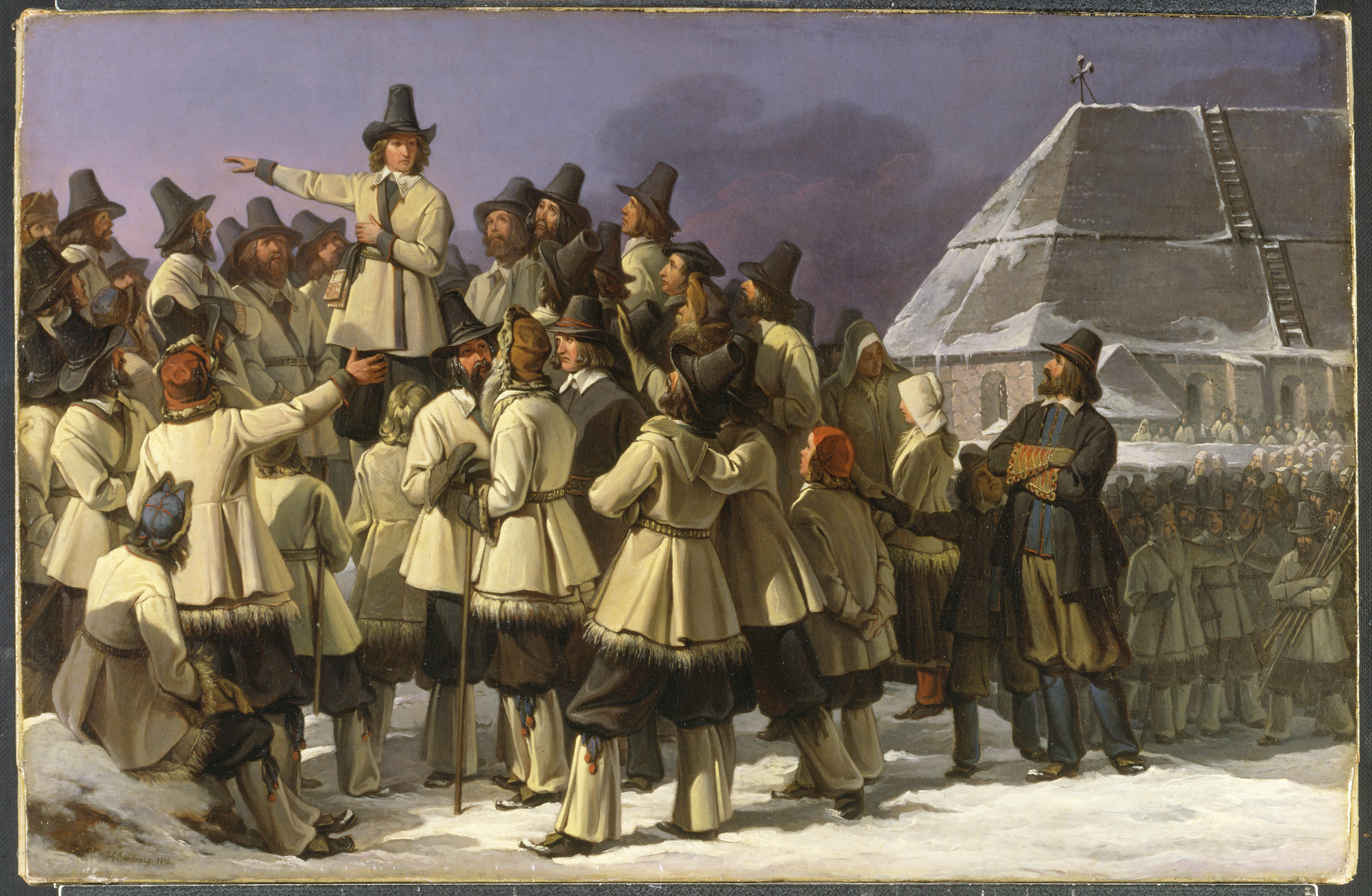
Gustav Eriksson addressing men from Dalarna in Mora. Painting by Johan Gustaf Sandberg.

The election of Gustav Eriksson as a regent made many Swedish nobles, who had so far stayed loyal to King Christian, switch sides. Some noblemen, still loyal to the king, chose to leave Sweden, while others were killed. As a result, the Swedish Privy Council lost old members who were replaced by supporters of Gustav Eriksson. Most fortified cities and castles were conquered by Gustav's rebels, but the strongholds with the best defenses, including Stockholm, were still under Danish control. In 1522, after negotiations between Gustav Eriksson's faction and Lübeck, the Hanseatic city joined the war against Denmark. The winter of 1523 saw their joint forces attack the Danish and Norwegian areas of Scania, Halland, Blekinge, and Bohuslän. During this winter, Christian II was overthrown and replaced by Frederick I. The new king openly claimed the Swedish throne and had hopes Lübeck would abandon the Swedish rebels. The German city, preferring an independent Sweden to a strong Kalmar Union dominated by Denmark, took advantage of the situation and put pressure on the rebels. The city wanted privileges on future trade as well as guarantees regarding the loans they had granted the rebels. The Privy Council and Gustav Eriksson knew the support from Lübeck was absolutely crucial. As a response, the council decided to appoint Gustav Eriksson king.

The ceremonial election of Gustav as king of Sweden took place when the leading men of Sweden met in Strängnäs in June 1523. When the councilors of Sweden had chosen Gustav as king, he met with the two visiting councilors of Lübeck. The German representatives supported the appointment without hesitation and declared it an act of God. Gustav stated he had to bow to what was described as the will of God. In a meeting with the Privy Council, Gustav Eriksson announced his decision to accept. In the following ceremony, led by the deacon of Strängnäs, Laurentius Andreae, Gustav swore the royal oath. The next day, bishops and priests joined Gustav in Roggeborgen where Andreae raised the holy sacrament above a kneeling Gustav Eriksson. Flanked by the councilors of Lübeck, Gustav Eriksson was brought to Strängnäs Cathedral where the king sat down in the choir with the Swedish privy councilors on one side, and the Lübeck representatives on the other. After the hymn "Te Deum", Andreae proclaimed Gustav Eriksson king of Sweden. He was, however, still not crowned. In 1983, in remembrance of the election of Gustav as Swedish king on 6 June, that date was declared the National Day of Sweden.

=== Eric XIV of Sweden ===
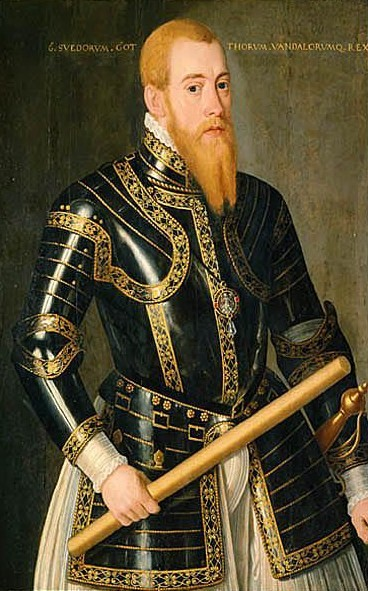
Eric XIV Vasa, King of Sweden

Eric XIV was born at Tre Kronor on 13 December 1533. Before the age of two, he lost his mother. In 1536, his father, Gustav Vasa, married Margaret Leijonhufvud (1516–51), a Swedish noblewoman. He was crowned as Eric XIV, but was not necessarily the 14th king of Sweden named Eric. He and his brother Charles IX (1604–11) adopted regnal numbers according to Johannes Magnus's partly fictitious history of Sweden. There had, however, been at least six earlier Swedish kings with the name of Eric, as well as pretenders about whom very little is known.

In domestic politics, Eric's ambitions were strongly opposed by the Swedish nobility, including his half-brother, the later John III of Sweden (1537–92). John was the Duke of Finland and was married to a Polish-Lithuanian princess, which made him favourable in Poland-Lithuania. John pursued an expansionist policy in Livonia (present-day Estonia, Latvia, and the northern part of Lithuania) which led to contention between the brothers. In 1563, John was seized and tried for high treason by Eric's order.

In the fall of 1568, the dukes and the nobles rebelled, and Eric was dethroned. He was then imprisoned by Duke John, who took power. Eric's most trusted counsellor, Jöran Persson (1530–68), took much of the blame for the actions directed against the nobility during Eric XIV's reign and was executed shortly after John III ascended to the throne.

=== John III of Sweden ===
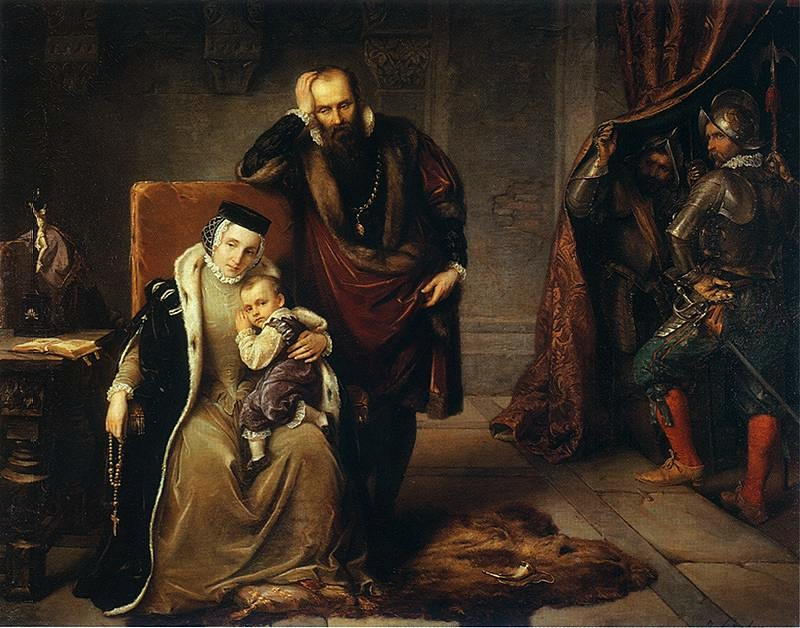
John III Vasa, Queen Catherine Jagiellon and young Sigismund (future King of Poland and Sweden, Grand Duke of Lithuania) in Gripsholm Castle

John further initiated peace talks with Denmark and Lübeck to end the Scandinavian Seven Years' War, but rejected the resulting Treaties of Roskilde (1568) where his envoys had accepted far-reaching Danish demands. After two more years of fighting, this war was concluded without many Swedish concessions in the Treaty of Stettin (1570). During the following years he defeated Russia in the Livonian War, and regained Narva by the Treaty of Plussa in 1583. His foreign policy was affected by his connection to the Polish-Lithuanian Commonwealth; his son Sigismund III Vasa was made king of Poland and Grand Duke of Lithuania in 1587.

In January 1569, John was recognized as king by the same riksdag that forced Eric XIV off the throne. But this recognition was not without influence from John; Duke Karl received confirmation on his dukedom without the restrictions of his power that the Arboga articles imposed. The nobility's power and rights were extended and their responsibilities lessened.

John was still concerned about his position as king as long as Eric was alive. In 1571 he ordered Erik's guards to kill him if there was any suspicion of an escape attempt. It is possible this is how Eric died in 1577.

== Polish–Lithuanian Commonwealth ==
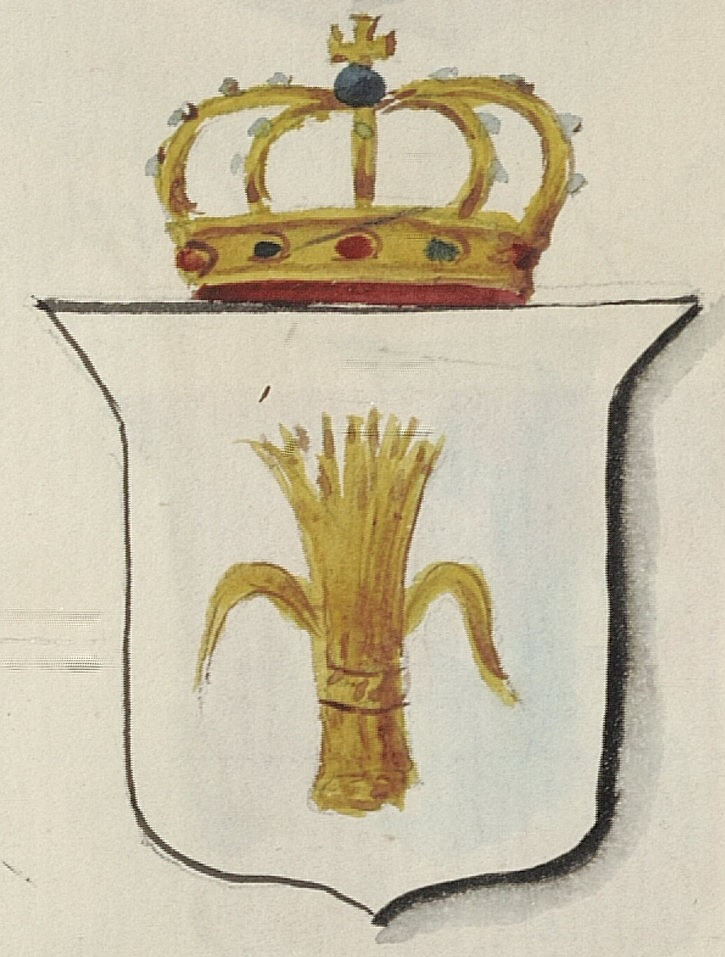
Personal coat of arms

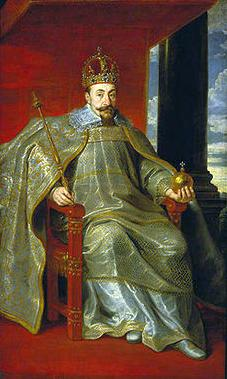
Sigismund III Vasa, King of Poland and Sweden, Grand Duke of Lithuania and Finland

Sigismund III Vasa was born when his parents, John III and Catherine Jagiellon, were held prisoner by John's brother King Eric XIV, but John replaced Eric in 1568. Sweden had become Protestant, but young Sigismund was raised Catholic. His Polish-Lithuanian connection came through his mother, daughter of Sigismund I the Old, and the Jagiellonian dynasty had ruled Kingdom of Poland and Grand Duchy of Lithuania and finally the joint Polish–Lithuanian Commonwealth since 1386. Sigismund was elected King of the Polish–Lithuanian Commonwealth on 19 August 1587.

From that time his official name and title became "Sigismund III, by the grace of God, king of Poland, grand duke of Lithuania, Ruthenia, Prussia, Masovia, Samogitia, Livonia and also hereditary king of the Swedes, Goths and Wends"; after his father died in 1592, he added "hereditary king of the Swedes, Goths, and Vandals".

- Royal titles in Latin: Sigismundus Tertius Dei gratia rex Poloniæ, magnus dux Lithuaniæ, Russiæ, Prussiæ, Masoviæ, Samogitiæ, Livoniæque, necnon Suecorum, Gothorum Vandalorumque hæreditarius rex.
- English translation: Sigismund III, by the grace of God, king of Poland, grand duke of Lithuania, Ruthenia, Prussia, Masovia, Samogitia, Livonia, and also hereditary king of the Swedes, Goths and Vandals.

=== Opposition to Sigismund ===
However, as was often the case with the Polish-Lithuanian electoral monarchy, the outcome was strongly contested by the "losers" and a faction of the Commonwealth's nobility backed Maximilian III, Archduke of Austria. Upon hearing of his election, King Sigismund slipped through the clutches of the Protestants in Sweden and landed in Poland on 7 October. He immediately agreed to give up several royal privileges to the Sejm (parliament) of the Commonwealth in the hope of winning over some of his enemies and settling the disputed election. Lesser Prussian Treasurer Jan Dulski proclaimed him king on behalf of the Crown Marshal Andrzej Opaliński. On 27 December, he was crowned in Wawel Cathedral in Kraków. It seemed that the issue of who would be King of Poland and Grand Duke of Lithuania had been settled when Maximilian III invaded at the head of his army to claim his crown. The hostilities did not last long as Hetman Jan Zamoyski at the head of a Polish-Lithuanian army loyal to King Sigismund met and successfully defeated the Austrian troops at the Battle of Byczyna and took Maximilian III as prisoner of war. However, at the request of Pope Sixtus V, King Sigismund III released Maximilian who surrendered his claim to the Polish-Lithuanian Commonwealth in 1589. King Sigismund also tried to maintain peace with his powerful neighbor by marrying Archduchess Anna of Austria in 1592. It was always his intention to be allied with Catholic Austria against the Protestant forces that were tearing Christendom apart.

=== Polish–Swedish union ===
After the death of John III of Sweden, his son Sigismund succeeded to the throne of Sweden. Sigismund at that time was already the elected King of Poland and Grand Duke of Lithuania (since 1587). Sigismund certainly valued the Swedish throne and upon learning about the death of his father, and the pretensions to the throne of his uncle, Duke Charles of Södermanland, he asked the Sejm (Commonwealth's parliament) for permission to leave the Commonwealth and go to Sweden, where he could secure the Swedish crown. The Sejm gave him permission, and on 3 August 1593, Sigismund, accompanied by his wife, Anna of Habsburg, and other followers, departed for Sweden.

The agreement of 19 February seemed to have calmed the situation; Sigismund was crowned in Uppsala Cathedral and became the king of Sweden. The Kingdom of Sweden was now in a personal union with Poland-Lithuania. In July, Sigismund left Sweden in the hands of the regency council and returned to the Commonwealth. Sweden was to be ruled jointly by the Privy Council of Sweden and Sigismund's uncle Duke Charles.

Sigismund, however, reneged on his earlier promises, opening Catholic schools, and giving Catholics prominent posts. Charles in turn did not give up on acquiring the Swedish throne and pursued his own political agenda. The new Riksdag he summoned at Arboga in 1597 – again despite the King's orders – saw few participants, and only one from the Privy Council. Even so, Duke Charles did not achieve support for his military action, but initiated it nonetheless. Parts of southern Sweden were successfully taken. Several of the Privy Council members fled to the Commonwealth to convince Sigismund to take counteractions. Sigismund sent a diplomatic mission, in an attempt to solve the conflict by negotiations. Charles at first looked ready to negotiate but in fact he was playing for time, trying to confirm his power at another Riksdag (in Arboga), recruiting peasants for his army, and isolating Sigismund's followers.

=== War against Sigismund ===
In 1598, the Sejm gave Sigismund the go-ahead to wage a military campaign against his opponents in Sweden; however it refused to give him significant support. Sigismund's army was composed mostly of mercenaries (Germans and Hungarians), supported by a relatively small Polish force (although with some artillery).

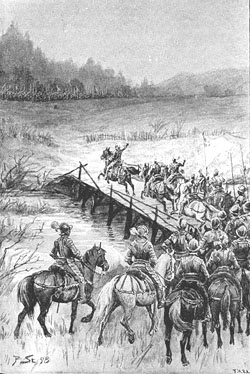
The Battle of Stångebro (or of Linköping) took place on 25 September 1598 and effectively ended the personal union between Sweden and the Polish–Lithuanian Commonwealth, existing since 1592.

Sigismund's campaign was poorly planned. He was unable to coordinate his troop movements with his supporters, particularly Fleming who was supposed to attack Charles from Finland. After initial successes (the taking of Kalmar and defeating Charles' troops at Stegeborg), Sigismund's forces were defeated on September 25, 1598, at the Battle of Stångebro, (also known as the battle of Linköping). Sigismund was captured and forced to hand over some of his followers such as the Chancellor of Sweden, Erik Larsson Sparre, (1550–1600). In May 1599, Charles' forces captured the last fortress held by Sigismund, Kalmar. On July 24, 1599, the Riksdag in Stockholm officially dethroned Sigismund. The new King of Sweden was Charles IX of Sweden, and the Polish–Swedish union was dissolved after barely seven years of existence. In March 1600, some of Sigismund's supporters were executed, including five senators in an event known as the Linköping Bloodbath.

== Tsardom of Russia ==
=== Polish–Russian War (1609–1618) ===
The Dimitriads and the Polish–Russian War of 1609–1618 took place in the early 17th century as a sequence of military conflicts and eastward invasions carried out by the Polish–Lithuanian Commonwealth, or the private armies and mercenaries led by the magnates (the Commonwealth aristocracy), when the Russian Tsardom was torn by a series of civil wars, the time most commonly referred to in the Russian history as the Time of Troubles, sparked by the Russian dynastic crisis and overall internal chaos. The sides and their goals changed several times during this conflict: the Polish–Lithuanian Commonwealth was not formally at war with Russia until 1609, and various Russian factions fought amongst themselves, allied with the Commonwealth and other countries or fighting against them. Sweden also participated in the conflict during the course of the Ingrian War (1610–1617), sometimes allying itself with Russia, and other times fighting against it. The aims of the various factions changed frequently as well as the scale of the parties' goals, which ranged from minor border adjustments to imposing the Polish Kings or the Polish-backed impostors' claims to the Russian throne and even the creation of a new state by forming a union between the Commonwealth and Russia.

=== Russian homage in 1611 ===
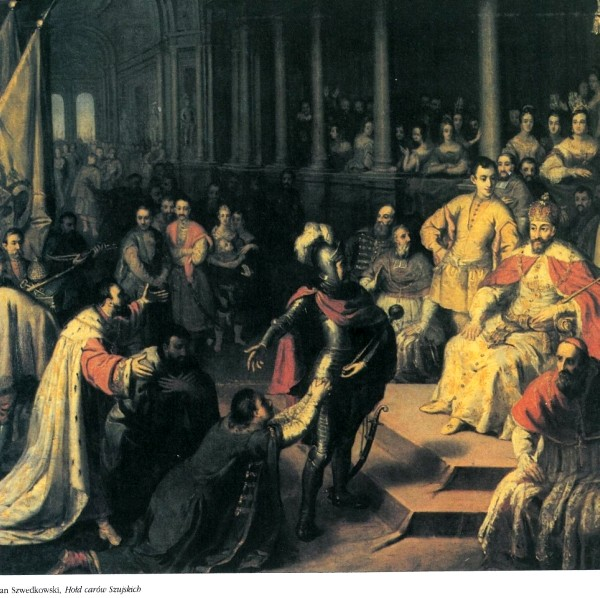
Shuysky's tribute, homage of the deposed Russian tsar Vasili Shuisky and his brothers Dmitri in Warsaw

The war can be divided into four stages. In the first stage, certain Commonwealth's szlachta (nobility), encouraged by some Russian boyars (aristocracy), but without the official consent of the Polish king and Lithuanian grand duke Sigismund III Vasa, attempted to exploit Russia's weakness and intervene in its civil war by supporting the impostors for the tsardom, False Dmitriy I and later False Dmitriy II, against the crowned tsars, Boris Godunov and Vasili Shuiski. The first wave of the Polish-Lithuanian intervention began in 1605 and ended in 1606 with the death of False Dmitri I. The second wave started in 1607 and lasted until 1609, when Tsar Vasili made a military alliance with Sweden. In response to this alliance, the Polish king and Lithuanian grand duke Sigismund III decided to intervene officially and to declare war upon Russia, aiming to weaken Sweden's ally and to gain territorial concessions.

Hetman of the Crown Stanisław Żółkiewski held a triumphal entry by the Kraków suburb of the Royal Palace, leading with him the prisoners: the Russian tsar Wasyl IV Szujski, his brothers: Dimitri Szujski with his wife - Grand Duchess Ekaterina Grigoryevna, daughter Grigory Malyuta Skuratov and Ivan Shuysky Mikhail Shein, and Filaret, the non-canonical Patriarch of Moscow and All Russia. After early Commonwealth victories (Battle of Klushino), which culminated in Polish-Lithuanian forces entering Moscow in 1610, Sigismund's son, Prince Władysław IV Vasa, was briefly elected tsar.

=== Władysław IV Vasa as tsar ===
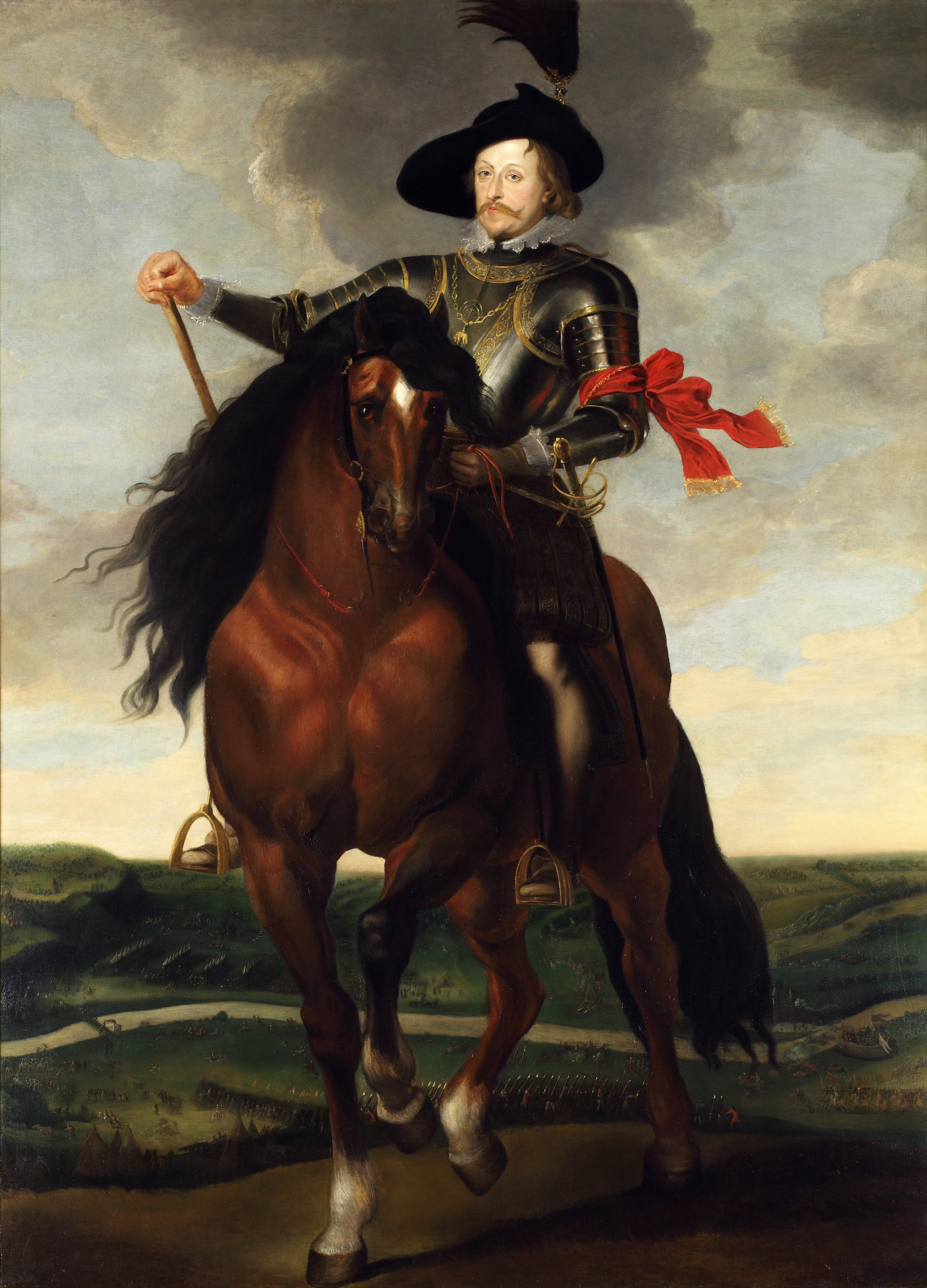
Władysław IV Vasa, King of Poland, Grand Duke of Lithuania and elected Tsar of Russia

With the intensification of the Polish-Lithuanian intervention in Russia, in 1609, the royal family moved to their residence in Vilnius, capital of the Grand Duchy of Lithuania. There he witnessed the fire of Vilnius, an event which even required the royal family to evacuate their residence in the Vilnius Castle. Later that year, Władysław, aged 15, was elected as tsar by the aristocratic council known as the Seven Boyars, who overthrew Tsar Vasili Shuisky during the Polish–Russian War and the Time of Troubles. His election was ruined by his father, Sigismund, who aimed to convert Muscovy's population from Orthodox Chrisity to Catholicism. Sigismund refused to agree to the boyar's request to send prince Władysław to Moscow and his conversion to Orthodoxy. Instead, Sigismund proposed that he should reign as a regent in Muscovy instead.^{[9]} This unrealistic proposal led to a resumption of hostilities. Briefly, beginning in 1610, Władysław struck Muscovite silver and gold coins (Kopek) in the Russian mints in Moscow and Novgorod with his titulary Tsar and Grand Prince Vladislav Zigimontovych of all Russia.

Władysław tried to regain the tsar's throne himself, organizing a campaign in 1616. Despite some military victories, he was unable to capture Moscow. The Commonwealth gained some disputed territories in the Truce of Deulino, but Władysław was never able to reign in Russia; the throne during this time was instead held by tsar Michael Romanov. He held on to the title, without any real power, until 1634. Likely, the failure of this campaign showed Władysław the limits of royal power in Poland-Lithuania, as major factors for the failure included significant autonomy of the military commanders, which did not see Władysław as their superior, and lack of funds for the army, as the Sejm of the Polish–Lithuanian Commonwealth refused to subsidize the war.

== Elective-hereditary monarchy in Poland–Lithuania ==
=== Silver Age ===
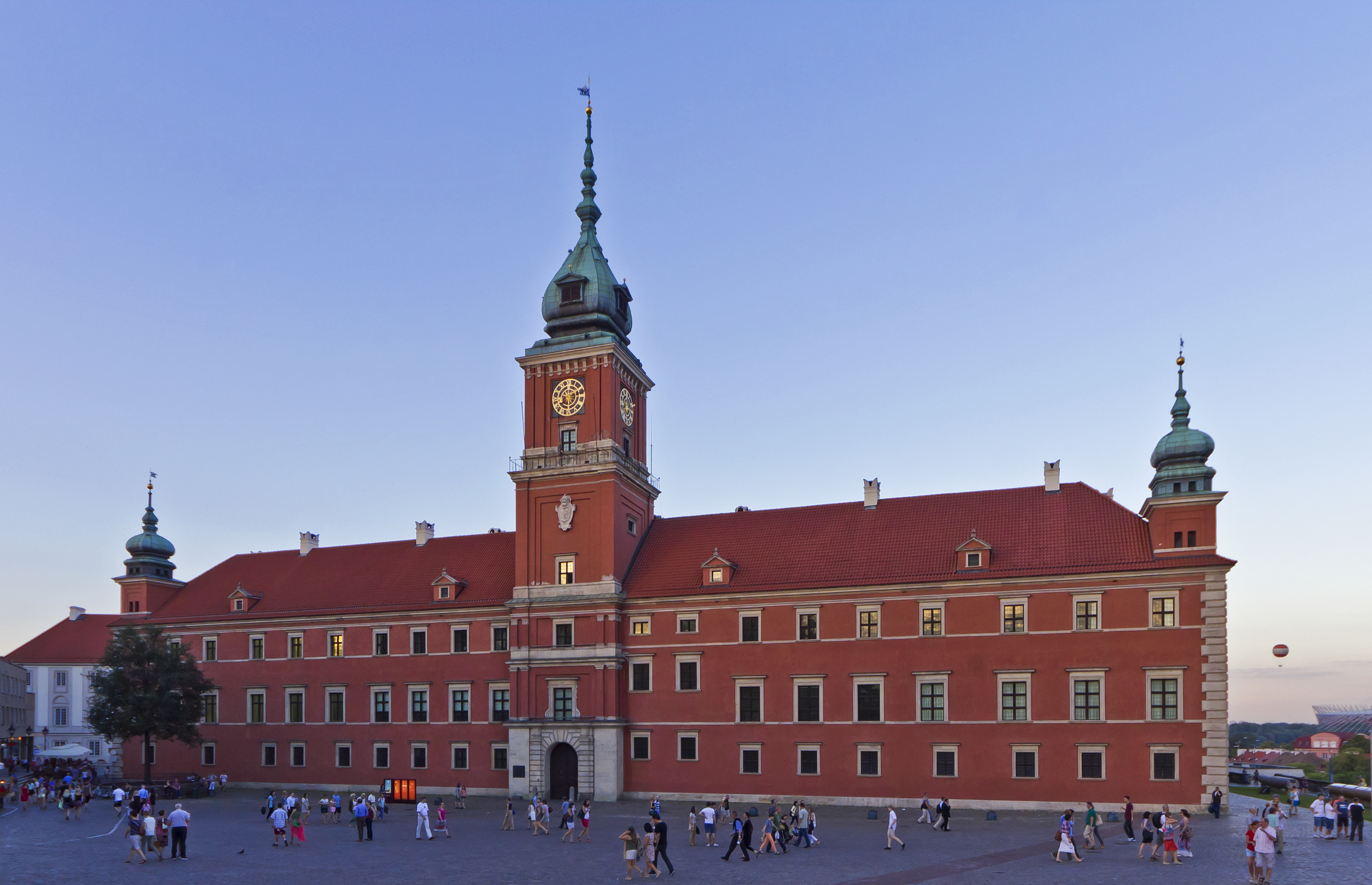
Royal Castle in Warsaw, the residence of Polish kings since 1611

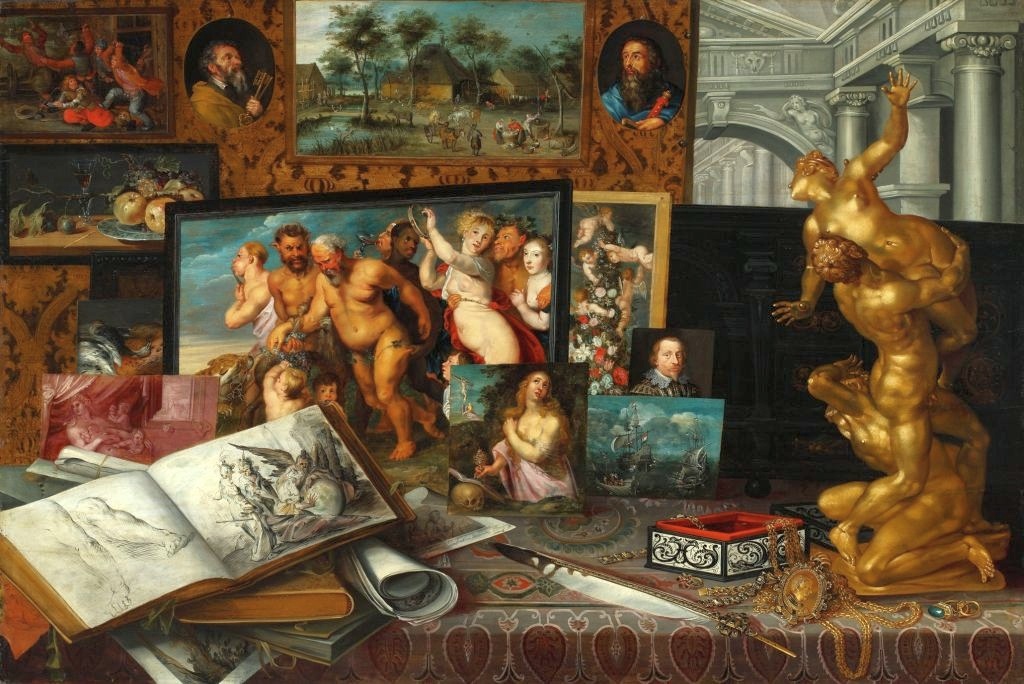
Art Collection of Prince Władysław Vasa (Royal Castle in Warsaw), according to artist's signature painted in Warsaw in 1626, depicts treasures purchased by the Prince during his journey across Europe.

The election sejm of 1632 eventually concluded in the election of Władysław; he had no serious other contenders. The decision on who would be the Commonwealth's next king was reached on 8 November, but as the pacta conventa were not yet ready, the official announcement was delayed until 13 November. In the pacta conventa, Władysław pledged himself to fund a military school and equipment; to find a way to fund a naval fleet; to maintain current alliances; not to raise armies, give offices or military ranks to foreigners, negotiate peace treaties or declare war without the Sejm's approval; not to take a wife without the Senate's approval; to convince his brothers to take an oath to the Commonwealth; and to transfer the profits from the Royal Mint to the Royal Treasury rather than to a private treasury. When the election result had been announced by the Crown Grand Marshal, Łukasz Opaliński, the nobility (szlachta), who had taken part in the election, began festivities in honor of the new king, which lasted three hours. Władysław was crowned in the Wawel Cathedral, in Kraków on 6 February in the following year.

Władysław IV owed nominal allegiance to the Imperial Habsburgs as a member of the Order of the Golden Fleece. His relationship with the Habsburgs was relatively strong; although he was not above carrying some negotiations with their enemies, like France, he refused Cardinal Richelieu's 1635 proposal of an alliance and a full-out war against them, despite potential lure of territorial gains in Silesia. He realized that such a move would cause much unrest in a heavily Catholic Commonwealth, that he likely lacked the authority and power to push such a change of policy through the Sejm, and that the resulting conflict would be very difficult.^{[42]} From 1636 onward, for the next few years, Władysław strengthened his ties with the Habsburgs.

In the meantime, Władysław still tried to take a leading role in European politics, and negotiate a peaceful settlement to the Thirty Years' War, a settlement which he hoped would ease his way into regaining the Swedish crown. Following the armistice of Stuhmsdorf, Władysław came to increasingly realize that his prospects for regaining the Swedish throne were dim. In the years 1636–1638 he proposed several reforms to strengthen his and his dynasty's power in the Commonwealth. His first plan was an attempt to secure a hereditary province within the country, which would not be threatened by the possible power shift following a future royal election; this, however, did not gain sufficient support in the Sejm.

Władysław used the title of the King of Sweden although he had no control over Sweden and never set foot in that country.

=== John II Casimir Vasa ===
John Casimir for most of his life remained in the shadow of his older half-brother, Władysław IV Vasa. He had few friends among the Polish nobility. Unfriendly, secretive, dividing his time between lavish partying and religious contemplation, and disliking politics, he did not have a strong power base nor influence at the Polish court, instead supporting unfavorable Habsburg policies. He did, however, display talent as a military commander, showing his abilities in the Smolensk War against Muscovy (1633).

==== The Deluge ====
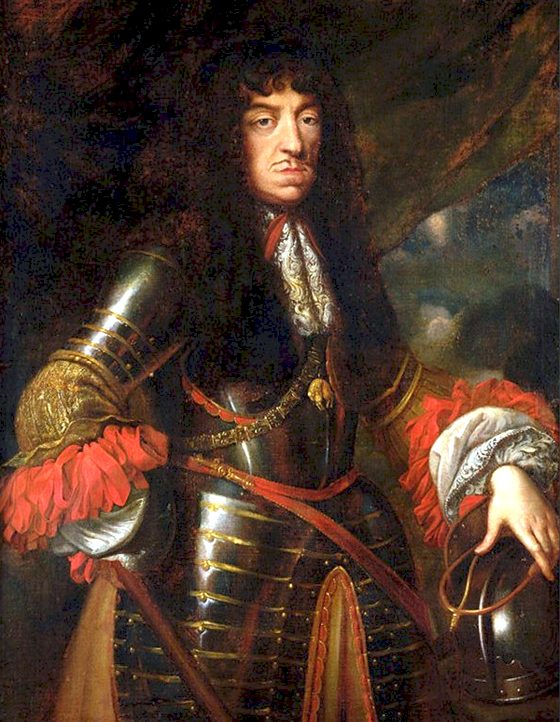
John II Casimir Vasa, King of Poland and Grand Duke of Lithuania

In 1648, John Casimir was elected by the Sejm of the Polish–Lithuanian Commonwealth to succeed his half-brother on the Polish-Lithuanian throne. The reign of the last of the Vasas in the Polish–Lithuanian Commonwealth would be dominated by the Russo-Polish War of 1654–67, followed by the war with Sweden ("The Deluge"), the scene for which had been set by the Commonwealth's two previous Vasa kings. Most of Poland was invaded by the Swedish army during the Deluge without much of a fight, due to the conspiratorial complicity of Polish and Lithuanian governors and nobility. In the course of a few years, the Commonwealth rose to force the Swedes out of Poland and Lithuania, ending the short-lived intrusions and campaigns, however, at a high cost. Most of the cities and towns in the Commonwealth were sacked, plundered and some were burnt to the ground, mostly by the retreating enemy units. Although the reign of John Casimir is remembered to be one of the most disastrous and perhaps most unsuccessful in the history of Poland and the Polish–Lithuanian Commonwealth, he is often referred to as the "warrior king" that fought bravely to save his nation and his people.

In 1660, John II Casimir was forced to renounce his claim to the Swedish throne and acknowledge Swedish sovereignty over Livonia and the city of Riga in modern-day Latvia. John Casimir had married his brother's widow, Marie Louise Gonzaga, who was a major support to the King. Marie Louise suddenly died in 1667 and this may have caused the monarch's early political decline.

==== Abdication and death ====
On 16 September 1668, grief-stricken after the death of his wife in the previous year, John II Casimir abdicated the throne of the Polish–Lithuanian Commonwealth, and returned to France, where he joined the Jesuits and became abbot of Abbey of Saint-Germain-des-Prés in Paris. Following his abdication Michał Korybut Wiśniowiecki (Michael I) was elected the new king and was crowned on September 29, 1669. Before his death John Casimir intended to return to Poland, however shortly before the journey in Autumn 1672 he fell dangerously ill to the news of the fall of Kamieniec Podolski, which was seized by the Ottomans. He then turned to Pope Clement X to ask for assistance for the Commonwealth in a defensive war against the Turks. The French, who were secretly in contact with him during his stay in the abbey, were astonished by such a great affection of the king to remember the loss of his kingdom, and so concerned about the loss of only one city. Nevertheless, distressed and seriously ill John II Casimir died shortly after the unexpected Turkish invasion of Commonwealth on December 16, 1672, from apoplexy and was buried inside the Wawel Cathedral in Kraków. His heart was interred in the Abbey of Saint-Germain-des-Prés.

== Continuation in Sweden ==
=== Charles IX of Sweden ===
The Riksdag at Linköping, 24 February 1604 declared that Sigismund abdicated the Swedish throne, that duke Charles was recognized as the sovereign. He was declared king as Karl IX (anglicized as Charles IX). Charles's short reign was one of uninterrupted warfare. The hostility of the Commonwealth and the breakup of Russia involved him in overseas contests for the possession of Livonia and Ingria, the Polish–Swedish War (1600–1611) and the Ingrian War, while his pretensions to claim Lappland brought upon him a war with Denmark in the last year of his reign.

In all these struggles, he was more or less unsuccessful, owing partly to the fact that he and his forces had to oppose superior generals (e.g. Jan Karol Chodkiewicz and Christian IV of Denmark) and partly to sheer ill-luck. Compared with his foreign policy, the domestic policy of Charles IX was comparatively unimportant. It aimed at confirming and supplementing what had already been done during his regency. He did not officially become king until 22 March 1604. The first deed in which the title appears is dated 20 March 1604; but he was not crowned until 15 March 1607.

=== Gustav II Adolf Vasa ===
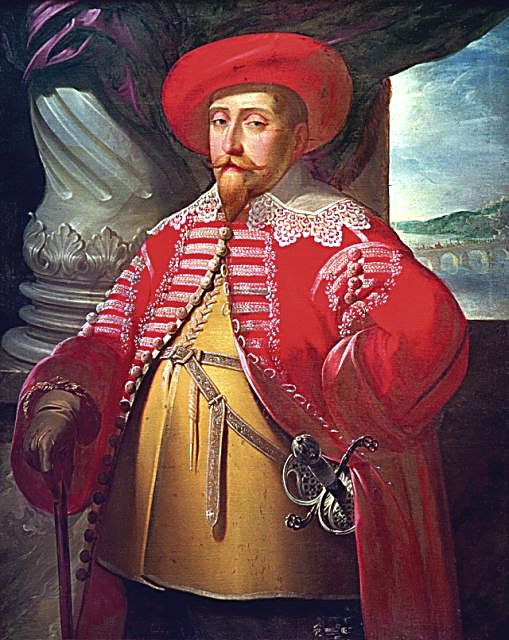
Gustav II Adolf in Polish 'delia' coat, painting by Matthäus Merian, 1632

Gustavus Adolphus was born in Stockholm as the oldest son of Duke Charles of the Vasa dynasty and his second wife, Christina of Holstein-Gottorp. At the time, the King of Sweden was Gustavus Adolphus' cousin Sigismund. The staunch Protestant Duke Charles forced the Catholic Sigismund to let go of the throne of Sweden in 1599, a part of the preliminary religious strife before the Thirty Years' War, and reigned as regent before taking the throne as Charles IX of Sweden in 1604. Crown Prince Gustav Adolph had Gagnef-Floda in Dalecarlia as a duchy from 1610. Upon his father's death in October 1611, a sixteen-year-old Gustavus inherited the throne (declared of age and able to reign himself at seventeen as of 16 December), as well as an ongoing succession of occasionally belligerent dynastic disputes with his Polish-Lithuanian cousin. Sigismund III wanted to regain the throne of Sweden and tried to force Gustavus Adolphus to renounce the title.

In a round of this dynastic dispute, Gustavus invaded Livonia when he was 31, beginning the Polish-Swedish War (1625–1629). He intervened on behalf of the Lutherans in Germany, who opened the gates to their cities to him. His reign became famous from his actions a few years later when in June 1630 he landed in Germany, marking the Swedish Intervention in the Thirty Years' War. Gustavus intervened on the anti-Imperial side, which at the time was losing to the Holy Roman Empire and its Catholic allies; the Swedish forces would quickly reverse that situation.

Gustavus was married to Maria Eleonora of Brandenburg, the daughter of John Sigismund, Elector of Brandenburg, and chose the Prussian city of Elbing as the base for his operations in Germany. He died in the Battle of Lützen in 1632. His early death was a great loss to the Lutheran side. This resulted in large parts of Germany and other countries, which had been conquered for Lutheranism, to be reconquered for Catholicism (via the Counter-Reformation). His involvement in the Thirty Years' War gave rise to the saying that he was the incarnation of "the Lion of the North", or as it is put in German "der Löwe von Mitternacht".

==== Thirty Years' War ====
Gustav II Adolf's success in making Sweden one of the great powers of Europe, and perhaps the most important power in the Thirty Years' War after France and Spain, was due not only to his military brilliance, but also to important institutional reforms in Sweden's government. The chief among these reforms was the institution of the first Parish registrations, so that the central government could more efficiently tax and conscript its populace.

Gustavus Adolphus was an extremely able military commander. His innovative tactical integration of infantry, cavalry, logistics and particularly his use of artillery, earned him the title of the "Father of Modern Warfare". Future commanders who studied and admired Gustav II Adolf include Napoleon I of France and Carl von Clausewitz. His advancements in military science made Sweden the dominant Baltic power for the next one hundred years (see Swedish Empire). He is also the only Swedish monarch to be styled "the Great". This decision was made by the Swedish Estates of the Realm, when they convened in 1633. Thus, by their decision he is officially, to this day, to be called Gustaf Adolf the Great (Gustavus Adolphus Magnus).

Gustavus Adolphus was the main figure responsible for the success of Swedish arms during the Thirty Years' War and led his nation to great prestige. As a general, Gustavus Adolphus is famous for employing mobile artillery on the battlefield, as well as very aggressive tactics, where attack was stressed over defense, and mobility and cavalry initiative were emphasized.

=== Christina, Queen of Sweden ===
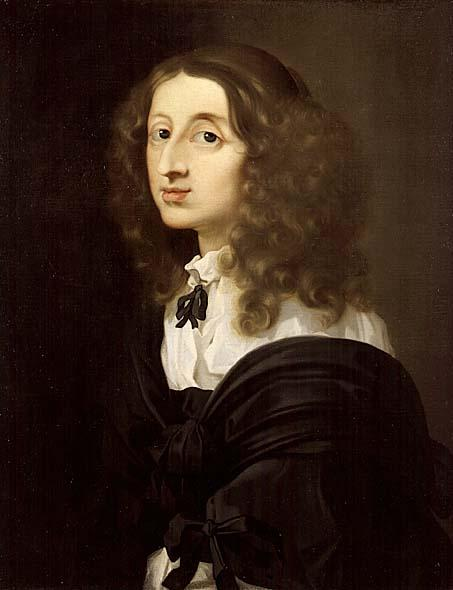
Christina (1626–1689) was Queen regnant of Sweden, with the titles of Queen of the Swedes, Goths and Wends, Grand Princess of Finland, and Duchess of Estonia, Livonia and Karelia, Bremen-Verden, Stettin, Pomerania, Cassubia and Vandalia.

Christina was the only surviving legitimate child of King Gustav II Adolph and his wife Maria Eleonora of Brandenburg. At the age of six she succeeded her father on the throne upon his death at the Battle of Lützen, and began ruling when she reached the age of 18.

Christina is remembered as one of the most educated women of the 1600s. She was fond of paintings, books, manuscripts, and sculptures. With her interest in religion, philosophy, mathematics and alchemy, she attracted many scientists to Stockholm, wanting the city to become the "Athens of the North". She was intelligent, fickle and moody; she rejected the sexual role of a woman. She caused a scandal when she decided not to marry and in 1654 when she abdicated her throne. She changed her name to Kristina Augusta Wasa and converted to Catholicism, adopting the name Christina Alexandra.

At the age of 28 the "Minerva of the North" moved to Rome. The Pope described Christina as "a queen without a realm, a Christian without faith, and a woman without shame". Notwithstanding all that, she became a leader of the theatrical and musical life and protected many Baroque artists, composers, and musicians.

== Swedish noblemen ==
- Johan Kristiernsson Vasa of Örby in the province of Uppland
- Erik Johansson Vasa (1470–1520), Privy Councillor, lord of Rydboholm Castle in the Roslagen

== Regents of Sweden ==
- Kettil Karlsson (c. 1433–1465), Bishop of Linköping, reigned as Lord Protector and Regent of Sweden 1464–1465

== Monarchs of Sweden ==
- Gustav I (born 1496, reigned 1523–1560)
- Eric XIV (reigned 1560–1568)
- John III (reigned 1568–1592)
- Sigismund (reigned 1592–1599)
- Charles IX (reigned 1599–1611; officially became king in March 1604)
- Gustavus Adolphus (Gustav Adolf the Great) (reigned 1611–1632)
- Christina (reigned 1632–1654)

In 1654 Christina, the daughter of Gustavus Adolphus, the Protestant Champion of the Thirty Years' War, abdicated, converted to Catholicism and left the country. The throne passed to her half-cousin Charles X of the House of Palatinate-Zweibrücken, a cadet branch of the Wittelsbachs.

The kings of the house of Holstein-Gottorp, which produced the kings of Sweden from 1751 to 1818, emphasized their Vasa descent through a female line. The current ruling house of Bernadotte similarly claims a Vasa mantle: Charles XIV was an adopted son of Charles XIII; his son Oscar I married a Vasa descendant Josephine of Leuchtenberg; their grandson Gustav V married Victoria of Baden who was a great-grandchild of Gustav IV Adolf of the house Holstein-Gottorp.

== Monarchs of Poland and Lithuania ==
- Sigismund III Vasa (1587–1632)
- Władysław IV (1632–1648)
- John II Casimir (1648–1668)

John III of Sweden married Catherine Jagiellon, the sister of Sigismund II Augustus. When Sigismund II died without issue, the son of John III of Sweden and Catherine Jagiellon was elected King of Poland and Grand Duke of Lithuania as Sigismund III in 1587. On John's death, Sigismund also gained the Swedish throne.

However, Sigismund was Catholic, which ultimately led to his losing the throne in Sweden. His Lutheran uncle Charles IX succeeded him. We thus have two Houses of Vasa from this point onwards: the senior, Catholic branch ruling in Poland and Lithuania, and the cadet, Protestant branch ruling in Sweden. This arrangement led to numerous wars between the two states. After John, the Polish-Lithuanian Vasas died out. See also Rulers of Poland and Rulers of Lithuania.

Coat of arms of the Polish-Lithuanian branch of the House of Vasa as elected kings of Poland, grand dukes of Lithuania and Ruthenia and rightful hereditary kings of Sweden (Finland and Estonia)

Royal banner of the Polish–Lithuanian Commonwealth during the reign of the House of Vasa (1587–1668)

== Family tree ==
Main article (Swedish): Vasaätten

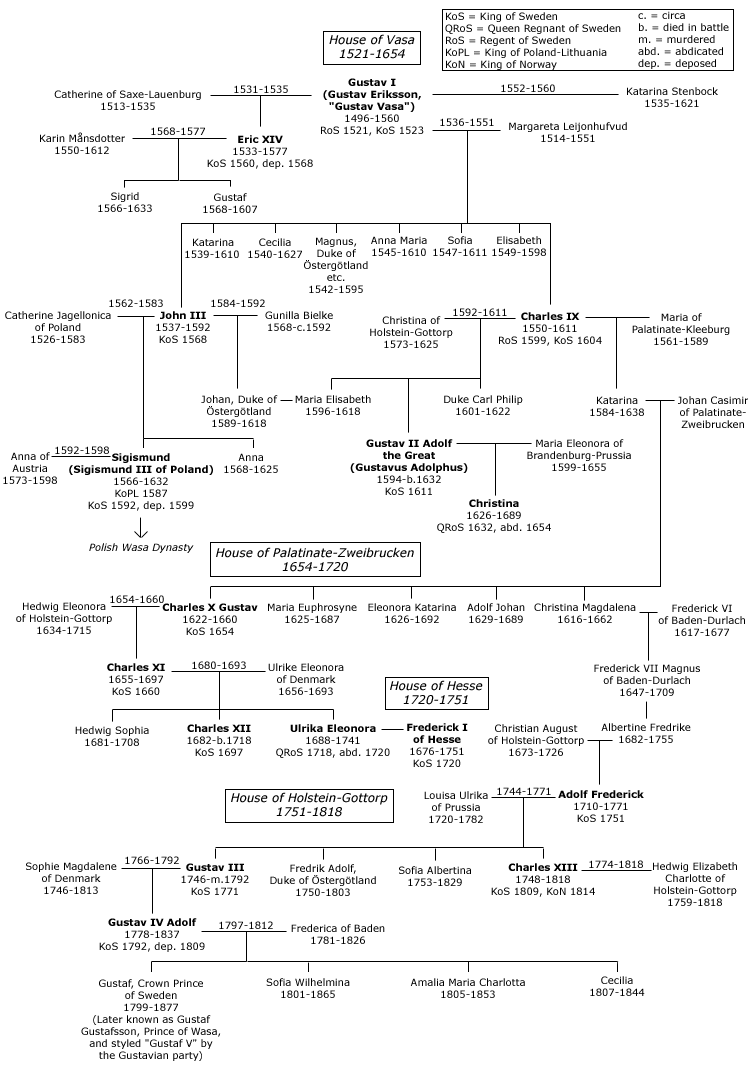
The House of Vasa and its connection to successor dynasties in Sweden.

A clickable chart showing the Vasa ancestry and male line:

House of Vasa ancestry and male line

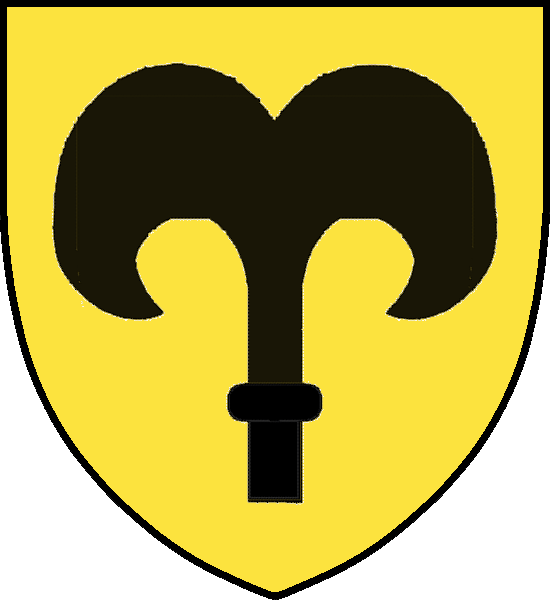
Nils Kettilsson (Vasa) (d. 1378)
Krister Nilsson (Vasa) (d. 1442)	Ramborg Nilsdotter m. Tord Bonde (Röriksson) (Bonde family)
Karl Kristiernsson (Vasa) (d. 1440)	Johan Kristiernsson (Vasa) (d. 1477)	Nils Kristiernsson (Vasa) (d. 1464)	Kristina Kristiernsdotter m. Bengt Jönsson (Oxenstierna)	Knut Tordsson (d. 1413)
Kettil Karlsson (c. 1433–1465); Bishop of Linköping, 1459–1465; Swedish regent, 1465	Erik Johansson Vasa (c. 1470–1520)	Charles VIII Bonde (1409–1470) r. 1448–1457, 1464–1465
Gustav I Eriksson Vasa (1496–1560); Regent 1521–1523 r. 1523–1560
Eric XIV (1533–1577) r. 1560–1568	John III (1537–1592) r. 1568–1592	Charles IX (1550–1611); Regent 1599–1604 r. 1604–1611	Magnus (1542–1595); Duke of Östergötland
Julius Gyllenhielm (1560–1581)	Sigismund III Vasa (1566–1632) r. 1592–1599	Catherine (1584–1638)	Gustav II Adolph (1594–1632) r. 1611–1632	Carl Gyllenhielm (1574–1650); Swedish field marshal
Władysław IV Vasa (1595–1648); King of Poland and Grand Duke of Lithuania r. 1632–1648	John II Casimir Vasa (1609–1672); King of Poland and Grand Duke of Lithuania r. 1648 – 1668 (abdicated)	Charles X Gustav (1622–1660) r. 1654–1660	Christina (1626–1689) r. 1632–1654	Gustaf Gustafsson (1616–1653) af Vasaborg, 1637; Count of Nystad, 1647

and, a clickable family tree showing the house of Vasa and the descent of all subsequent Swedish Monarchs from them:

House of Vasa to Bernadotte and Links to Dynasties

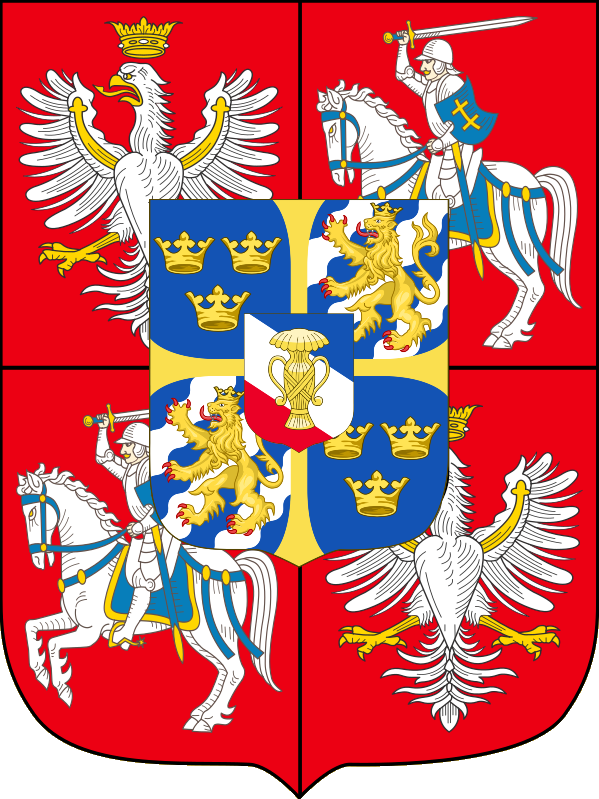
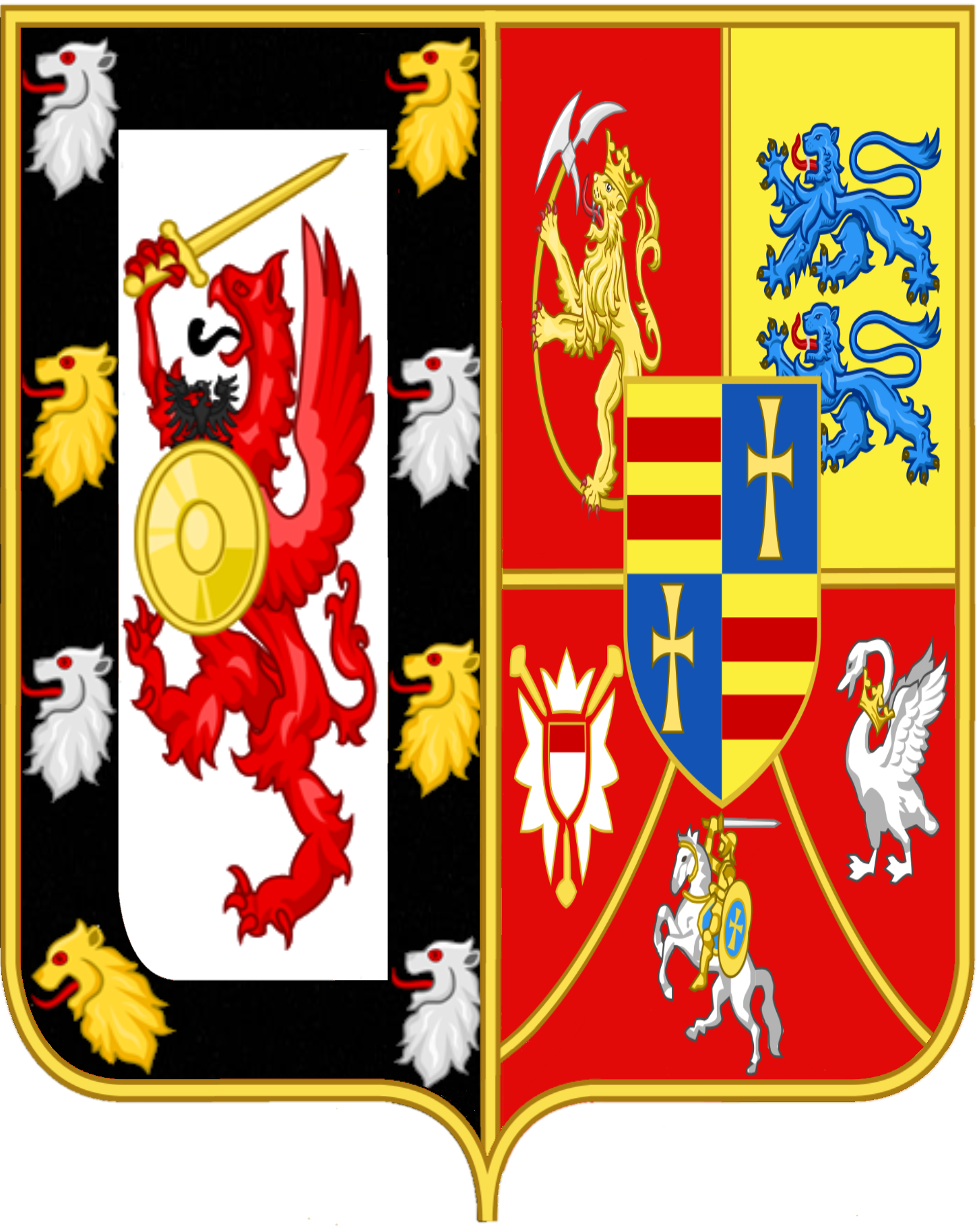
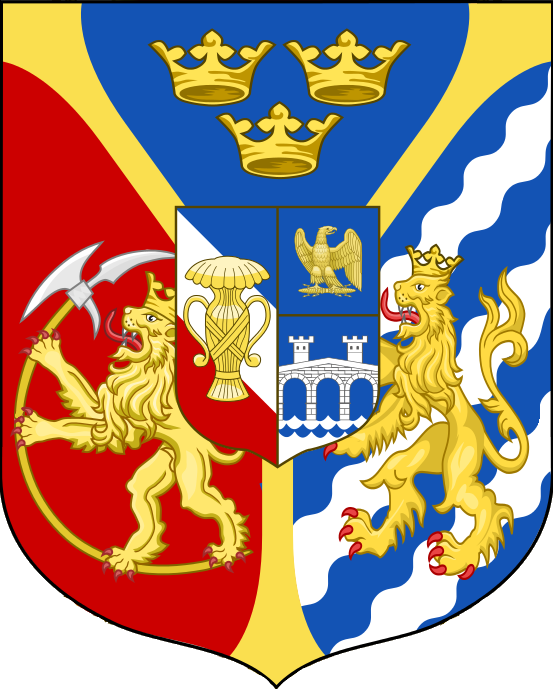
House of Oldenburg
Christopher (1416–1448) r. 1440–1448	Dorothea of Brandenburg (1430–1495)	Christian I (1426–1481) r. 1457–1464	Charles VIII (1409–1470) r. 1448–1457, 1464–1465
John II (1455–1513) r. 1497–1501	Frederick I of Denmark (1471–1533)
Gustav I Eriksson Vasa (1496–1560); Regent 1521–1523 r. 1523–1560	Christian II (1481–1559) r. 1520–1521	Christian III of Denmark (1503–1559)	Adolf, Duke of Holstein-Gottorp (1526–1586)
Eric XIV (1533–1577) r. 1560–1568	John III (1537–1592) r. 1568–1592	Charles IX (1550–1611); Regent 1599–1604 r. 1604–1611	John Adolf, Duke of Holstein-Gottorp (1575–1616)
Sigismund III Vasa (1566–1632) r. 1592–1599	Gustav II Adolph (1594–1632) r. 1611–1632	Princess Catherine (1584–1638)	John Casimir, Count Palatine of Kleeburg (1589–1652)	Frederick III, Duke of Holstein-Gottorp (1597–1659)
Władysław IV Vasa (1595–1648); King of Poland; Grand Duke of Lithuania r. 1632–1648	John II Casimir Vasa (1609–1672); King of Poland; Grand Duke of Lithuania r. 1648 – 1668 (abdicated)	Christina (1626–1689) r. 1632–1654	Charles X Gustav (1622–1660) r. 1654–1660	House of Sweden—Palatine-Zweibrücken	Christina Magdalena of the Palatinate-Zweibrücken (1616–1662)	Frederick VI, Margrave of Baden-Durlach (1617–1677)
Charles XI (1655–1697) r. 1660–1697	John Frederick, Margrave of Brandenburg-Ansbach (1654–1686)	Johanna Elisabeth of Baden-Durlach (1651–1680)	Frederick VII, Margrave of Baden-Durlach (1647–1709)	Christian Albert, Duke of Holstein-Gottorp (1641–1695)
Hedvig Sophia of Sweden; Heiress of Sweden; Eldest sister of Charles XII of Sweden (1681–1708)	Frederick I (1676–1751) r. 1720–1751	Ulrika Eleonora (1688–1741) r. 1718–1720	Charles XII (1682–1718) r. 1697–1718	Dorothea Friederike of Brandenburg-Ansbach (1676–1731)	Johann Reinhard III, Count of Hanau-Lichtenberg (1665–1736)	Margravine Albertina Frederica of Baden-Durlach (1682–1755)	Christian August of Holstein-Gottorp, Prince of Eutin (1673–1726)
Charles Frederick; Duke of Schleswig-Holstein-Gottorp r. 1702–1739 (1700–1739)	Grand Duchess Anna Petrovna of Russia; Daughter and eventual heiress of Peter the Great r. 1725–1728 (1708–1728)	Louis VIII, Landgrave of Hesse-Darmstadt (1691–1768)	Countess Charlotte of Hanau-Lichtenberg (1700–1726)	Adolf Frederick (1710–1771) r. 1751–1771
House of Holstein-Gottorp-Romanov	House of Holstein-Gottorp (Swedish line)
Peter III; Emperor of Russia r. 1762 (1728–1762)	Prince George William of Hesse-Darmstadt (1722–1782)
House Sweden-Bernadotte	Maximilian I Joseph of Bavaria (1756–1825)	Princess Augusta Wilhelmine of Hesse-Darmstadt (1765–1796)	Gustav III (1746–1792) r. 1771–1792	Charles XIII (1748–1818) r. 1809–1818
Charles XIV John (1763–1844); Elected Crown Prince by the Riksdag 1810 r. 1818–1844	Eugène de Beauharnais (1781–1824)	Princess Augusta of Bavaria (1788–1851)	Gustav IV Adolf (1778–1837) r. 1792 – 1809
Oscar I (1799–1859) r. 1844–1859	Josephine of Leuchtenberg (1807–1876)	Leopold, Grand Duke of Baden (1790–1852)	Princess Sophie (1801–1865)	Crown Prince Gustav (1799–1877)
Charles XV (1826–1872) r. 1859–1872	Prince Gustaf; Duke of Uppland (1827–1852)	Oscar II (1829–1907) r. 1872–1907	Frederick I, Grand Duke of Baden (1826–1907)
Frederik VIII of Denmark (1843–1912)	Princess Louise; Queen consort of Denmark (1851–1926)	Prince Carl Oscar; Duke of Södermanland (1852–1854)	Gustaf V (1858–1950) r. 1907–1950	Victoria of Baden (1862–1930)
Gustaf VI Adolf (1882–1973) r. 1950–1973
Prince Gustaf Adolf; Duke of Västerbotten (1906–1947)
Carl XVI Gustaf (b. 1946) r. 1973–present
Crown Princess Victoria; Duchess of Västergötland (b. 1977); Crown Princess since 1980	Prince Carl Philip; Duke of Värmland (b. 1979); Crown Prince 1979–1980
Princess Estelle; Duchess of Östergötland (b. 2012)

== Development of the Vasa Arms ==
See: Category:Coats of arms of the House of Vasa

The gallery below shows the coat of arms and seal(s) of the Vasa family in detail.

The coat of arms carried by the family during the Middle Ages have been interpreted in many different ways; they have, among other things, been suggested to represent helmet tilts, building iron, spears with a lily hilt, a fleur-de-lis tipped stave, chess rooks or the tip of a halberd.

Drots (a medieval Swedish type of justice minister) Kristiern Nilsson moved the medieval coat of arms to the right (heraldic left), while the Swedish Chief Minister Kettil Karlsson (Vasa) moved the coat of arms straight vertically.

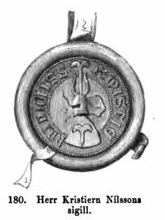
Kristiern Nilssons seal.

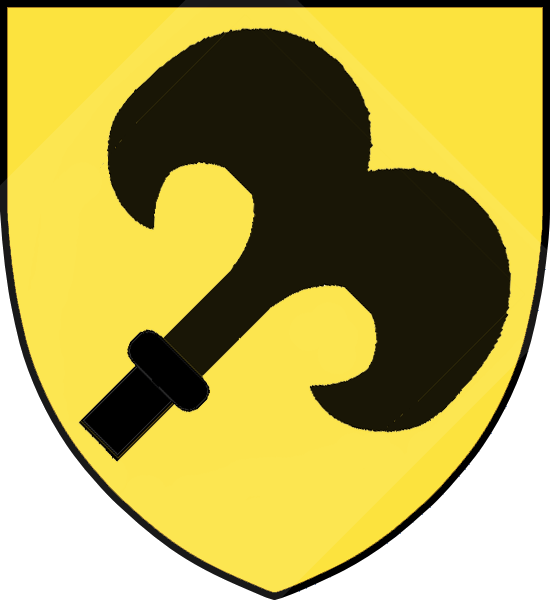
Krister Nilsson (Vasa)'s arms, leaning to the right.

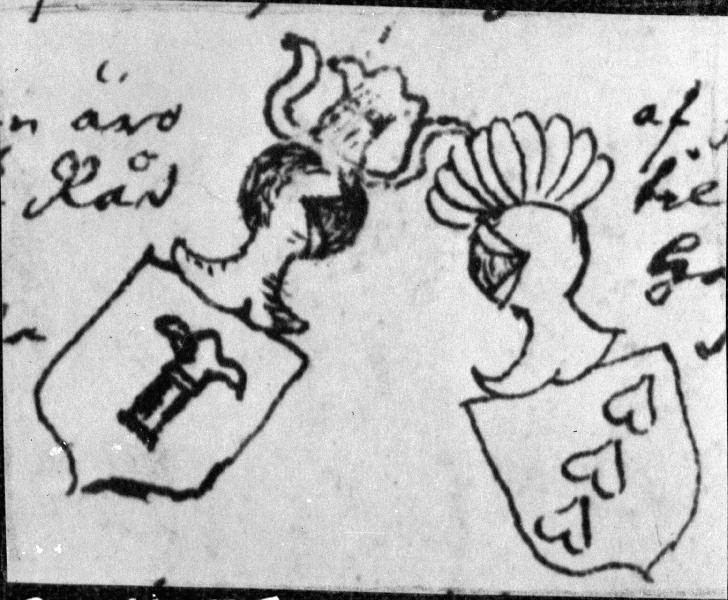
The Vasa arms and the older Stureätten's coat of arms as chalk painting in Frötuna church in Sweden. Photo of drawing in Uppsala Library.

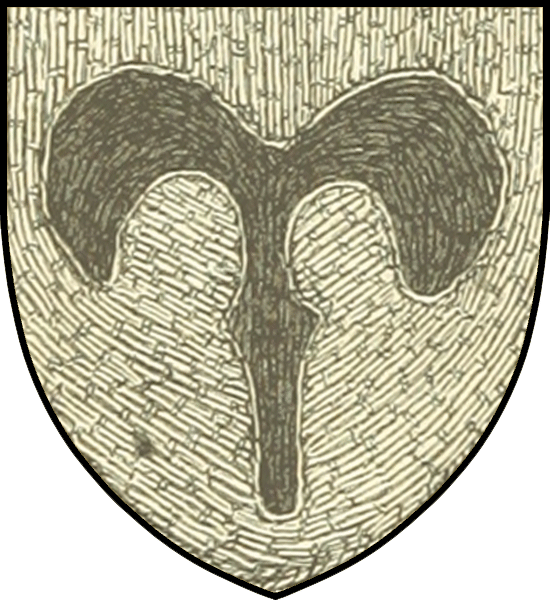
Arms Kettil Karlsson (Vasa), bishop in Linköping

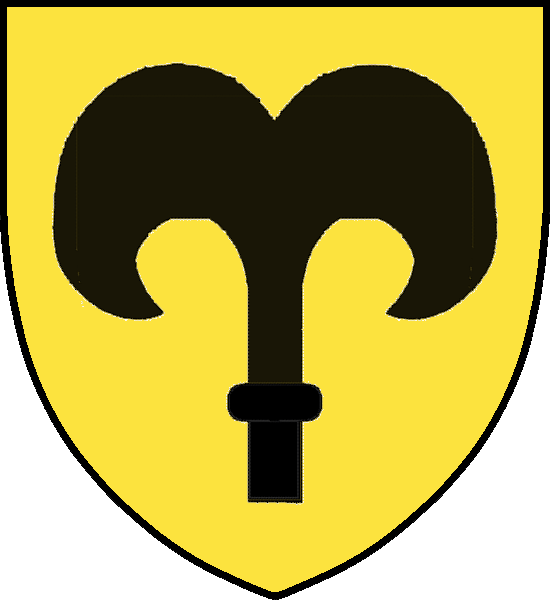
Drawn Kettil Karlsson (Vasa)

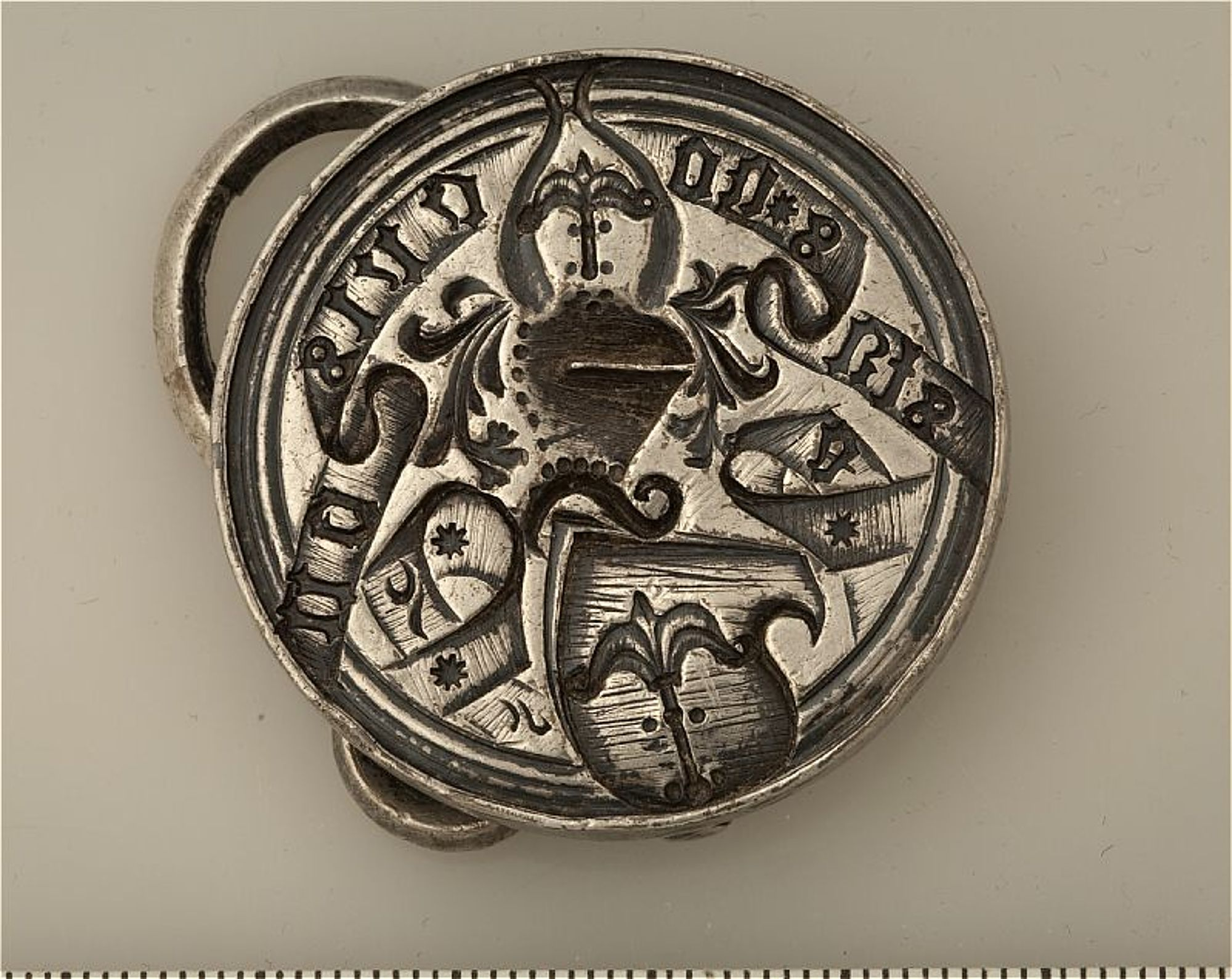
Gustav Vasa's seal stamp from 1521.

After Gustav Eriksson had become king, the coat of arms was changed in the 1540s to a black vase on a golden shield, which in the 16th century was understood as a sheaf of grain or a fascine. The king later merged his paternal coat of arms with his mother's coat of arms (for the Ekaätten) through the vase received golden tincture, and on a twice-cut shield in blue, silver and red (the place of the colors alternating at the beginning). Why the king created this coat of arms is unknown, but it has been suggested that the ancient noble house of Eka, which was very prominent in the last two centuries of the Middle Ages, gave the king more glory than the rather anonymous origins and arms of his paternal lowly ancestors.

Medieval Vasa arms

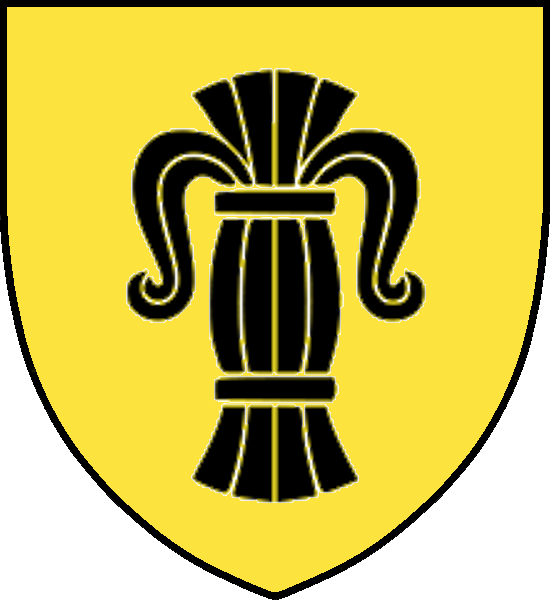
Gustav Vasa's arms interpreted as a vase after 1540.

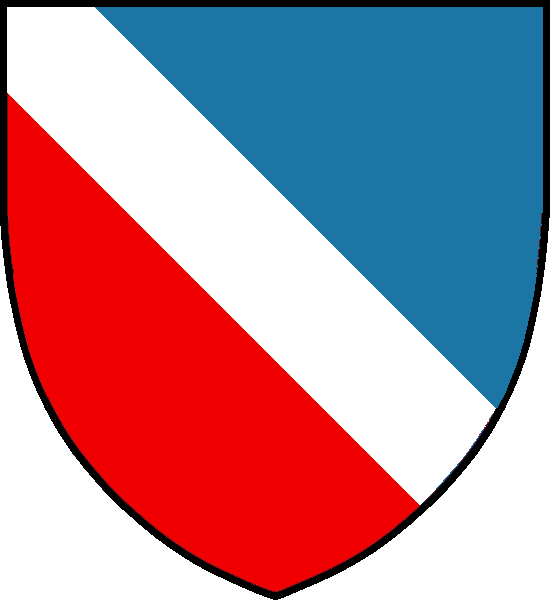
Ekaätten arms.

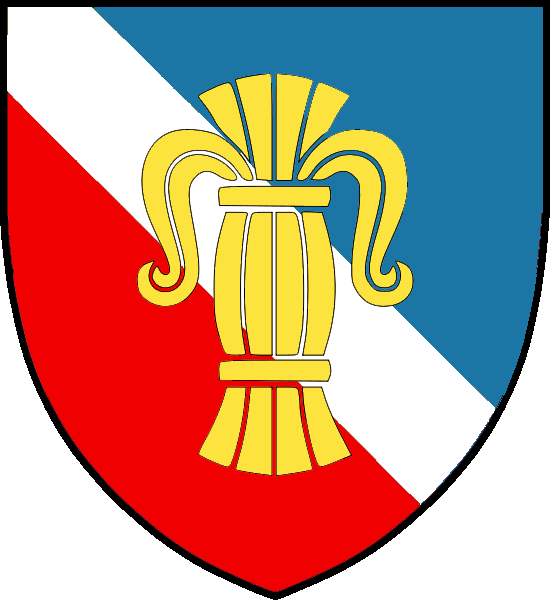
Gustav Vasa's combined arms.

Gustav Vasa's son Erik XIV used for a time a so-called coat of arms: a four-part shield with the coat of arms of the Vasa family as a heart shield, field 1 three crowns, field 2 the coat of arms of Bjälboätten, field 3 the coat of arms of Norway and field 4 the coat of arms of Denmark.

The Vasa coat of arms was set as an inescutcheon into the Swedish National Coat of arms (see below) when the Vasa's reigned both in Sweden. Since 1810 it has been impaled on the left with the Bernadotte arms on the right as part of the inescutcheon in the Swedish national coat of arms, after the Bernadotte family's first king in Sweden, Karl XIV Johan, was adopted by Karl XIII to show their descent from the Vasa. During the Swedish-Norwegian Union between 1818 and 1905, the coat of arms was also included in Norway's coat of arms as an inescutcheon shield. When the Vasa reigned in Poland-Lithuania, the Vasa arms were used in the inescutcheon of the Polish national coat of arms by the three kings who belonged to the Vasa dynasty, Johan III's son Sigismund, and Sigismund's two sons Władysław IV Vasa and Johan II Casimir.

Arms of the Vasa

Swedish Royal Arms under the Vasas

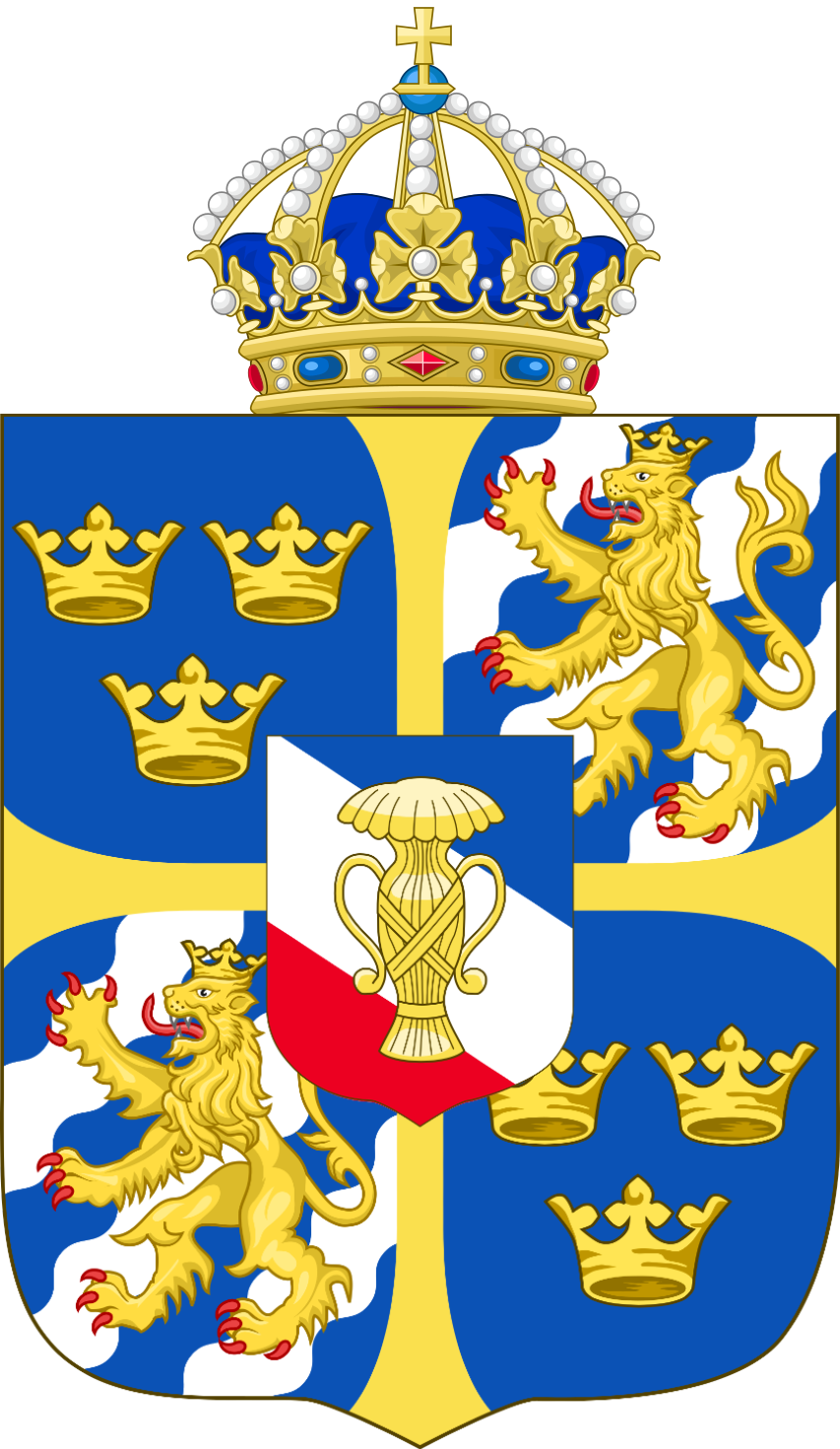
Swedish Royal Arms under the Vasas with Crown

Greater Coat of Arms of Sweden under the Vasa

Arms of Vasa impaled with the House of Bernadotte in the present Coat of Arms of Sweden

== Vasa Armorial ==
The following tables show the arms of the kings of Sweden under the Vasa:

Vasa Tranché d'azur et de gueules à la banche d'argent et à la gerbe d'or brochant sur le tout. Armes parlantes
House of Vasa 1523–1654 Écartelé à la croix pattée d'or, qui est la Croix de Saint-Eric, cantonnée en 1 et 4, d'azur à trois couronnes d'or posées 2 et 1 qui est de Suède moderne, en 2 et 3, d'azur, à trois barres ondées d'argent, au lion couronné d'or armé et lampassé de gueules, brochant sur le tout, qui est de Suède ancien, sur le tout, tranché d'azur et de gueules à la banche d'argent et à la gerbe d'or brochant sur le tout qui est de Vasa. in English A shield azure, quartered by a cross Or with outbent arms, and an inescutcheon containing the dynastic arms of the Royal House. In the first and fourth fields three open crowns Or, placed two above one. In the second and third fields three sinisterbendwise streams argent, a lion crowned with an open crown Or armed gules. The inescutcheon is party per pale the arms for the House of Vasa (Bendwise azure, argent and gules, a vasa Or). The main shield is crowned by a royal crown and surrounded by the insignia of the Order of the Seraphim. Supported by two lions regardant, crowned and with forked tails Or armed gules, standing on a compartment Or. All surrounded by purpure mantling doubled ermine, crowned with a royal crown and tied up with tasseled strings Or. Coronation Embroidery of King Erik XIV of Sweden stipulated the explicit imperial pretensions of Sweden :Écartelé à la croix pattée d'or, qui est la Croix de Saint-Eric, cantonnée en 1, d'azur à trois couronnes d'or posées 2 et 1 qui est de Suède moderne, en 2, d'azur, à trois barres ondées d'argent, au lion couronné d'or et lampassé de gueules brochant sur le tout, qui est de Suède ancien, en 3, de gueules, au lion couronné d'or, tenant dans ses pattes une hallebarde d'argent, emmanchée du second qui est de Norvège, en 4, d'or, à neuf cœurs de gueules, posés en trois pals, à trois léopards d'azur, armés et lampassés de gueules, couronnés du champ, (de Danemark). Sur le tout, tranché d'azur et de gueules à la bande d'argent, à la gerbe d'or brochante, qui est de Vasa. Greater arms of King Erik XIV of Sweden with ornaments shown on the exterior of Kalmar Castle.
House of Vasa, kings of Poland 1587–1668 Écartelé au I et IV de gueules, à l'aigle d'argent, becquée, lampassée, membrée, liée et couronnée d'or, au II et III de gueules à un chevalier d’argent, portant un écu d’azur à une croix patriarchale d’or, sur le tout d'azur à trois fleurs de lys d'or in English, Quarterly, I and IV, gules, an eagle argent, beaked, langued, membered, crowned or; II and III, a knight argent, bearing a shield azure, a patriarchal cross or, sur-le-tout the Swedish Royal Vasa arms as above.

The following branches were born illegitimate of the Vasa Kings of Sweden, but were enabled under the following names (see family trees above)

Counts of Vasaborg (Comtes, 1646. M. et. en 1754) Écartelé, aux 1 et 4, d'argent, à deux bars adossés d'azur, lorrés et peautrés de gueules, acc. en chef d'une couronne d'or, aux 2 et 3, de gueules, à un griffon d'or, couronné du même. Sur le tout de sable à un vase d'or, et une cotice en barre de gueules, brochant sur la vase. Trois casques couronnés. Cimiers: 1° un vol coupé alternativement d'azur et de gueules, chaque aile ch. d'une fasce d'argent, brochant sur le coupé; 2° le vase du surtout, entre deux proboscides coupées alternativement de sable et d'or; 3° le griffon, issant, privé des pattes de devant. Lambrequin: à dextre d'argent, d'azur et de gueules, à senestre d'argent, de gueules et d'azur.
Gyllenhielm. (Barons, 1615. M. ét. en 1650) Écartelé, au 1, taillé d'azur sur gueules, à la barre d'argent, brochant sur le taillé, à un demi-vase d'or, défaillant à senestre, brochant sur le tout, au 2, d'azur, à une enchaussure senestre de gueules, à une rivière en barre, brochant sur l'azur et le gueules, l'azur chargé d'un lion naissant d'or, lampassé de gueules, mouv. de la rivière, au 3, comme au 2, l'enchaussure à dextre et le lion contourné, au 4, comme au 1 le taillé transformé en tranché et la barre en bande. Deux casques couronnés. Cimiers: 1° un vase d'or, entre deux proboscides coupées, à dextre de gueules sur or, à senestre d'argent sur azur; 2° deux pattes d'ours d'or, posées en pal, tenant une bannière d'azur ch. d'un vase d'or, le tout entre deux bannières tiercées en fasce d'azur, d'or et de gueules.

== See also ==
- Vasa (disambiguation), listing many things named Vasa
- Swedish monarchs family tree
- Arms of the kings of Sweden (fr)
- Armorial of the House of Bernadotte
- Warship Vasa
- Vaasa, Finland
- House of Vasaborg
- Vasa Order of America
- List of Swedish wars

== Bibliography ==
- Gillingstam, Hans (1952). Ätterna Oxenstierna och Vasa under medeltiden (PDF). Stockholm.
- Harrison, Dick; Eriksson, Bo (2010). Sveriges historia: 1350–1600. Stockholm: Norstedt. ISBN 978-91-1-302439-4.
- Kristina; Rodén, Marie-Louise; Huldt, Cecilia; Melander, Viveca (2006). Brev och skrifter (PDF). Svenska klassiker / utgivna av Svenska akademien. Stockholm: Svenska akademien i samverkan med Atlantis. ISBN 9173531421.
- Larsson, Lars-Olof (2002). Gustav Vasa – landsfader eller tyrann?. Stockholm: Prisma. ISBN 91-518-3904-0.
- Louda, Jiri; Maclagan, Michael (1981). Lines of Succession. London: Orbis Publishing Ltd. ISBN 0-460-04519-9.

Royal House House of Vasa
Preceded by House of Oldenburg	Ruling House of the Kingdom of Sweden; 1523–1654	Succeeded by House of Palatinate-Zweibrücken
Preceded by Jagiellon dynasty	Ruling House of the Kingdom of Poland; 1587–1668	Succeeded by House of Wiśniowiecki
Preceded by Jagiellon dynasty	Ruling House of the Grand Duchy of Lithuania; 1587–1668	Succeeded by House of Wiśniowiecki
Preceded by House of Shuya	Ruling House of the Tsardom of Russia; 1610–1612	Succeeded by House of Romanov
