= Slet =

Slet or SLET may refer to:

- Slet, Aarhus, a suburb of Aarhus, Denmark
- SLET, the IATA code for El Trompillo Airport in Santa Cruz de la Sierra, Bolivia
- Slet, a massive gymnastic festival held by a Sokol movement

== See also ==
- Slat (disambiguation)
- Slot (disambiguation)
