= Planking =

Planking may refer to:

- Planking (fad), an activity consisting of lying face down—sometimes in an unusual or incongruous location
- Plank (exercise), an isometric core strength exercise
- Planking, a form of indirect grilling
- Shad Planking, an annual political event in Virginia
- Types of boat construction, see boat building

== See also ==
- Plank (disambiguation)
