= Slit experiment (disambiguation) =

The double-slit experiment is a demonstration that light and matter can be modelled by both waves and particles.

Slit experiment may also refer to:

- Young's interference experiment, the classical version of the double-slit experiment
- Single slit diffraction, the experiment with a single slit
