= Train slot =

License used in rail transport

In rail transport, a train slot is a license that allows its holder, usually a railway company, to run a train on a specific section of track at a specific time, similar to an airport slot in civil aviation. Rail infrastructure companies such as Network Rail in Great Britain and DB Netze in Germany own the tracks and stations in their area of responsibility and make money by selling train slots to companies which operate freight and passenger services.
