= Vasaborg =

Swedish noble family

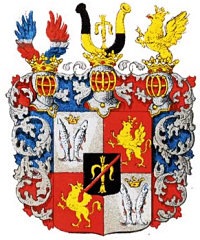
The Vasaborg family Coat of Arms.

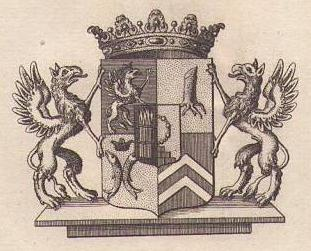
Coat of arms of the Stralenheim-Wasaburg.

The Vasaborg family was a Swedish noble family and an illegitimate branch of the House of Vasa.

== Origins ==
King Gustav II Adolf of Sweden had an illegitimate son called Gustav Gustavsson who in 1637 was ennobled under the name of Vasaborg, echoing his father's House of Vasa.

Queen Christina of Sweden raised her illegitimate half-brother to the dignity of a count when she gave him the Countship of Nystad in 1647. He and his family were registered to the Swedish House of Knights as its sixth comital family. Count Gustav's wife was Countess Anna Sofia of Wied-Runkel.

The Vasaborg coat of arms depicted a sheaf of hay, representing the arms of Vasa, crossed by a diagonal bend sinister, indicating Gustav's illegitimate origins.

The family of Vasaborg lived mostly in the new Swedish possessions of Lower Saxony, where they received several estates. Their seat was at Wildeshausen, which was received by the first Count after the Peace of Westphalia in 1648.

== The second count of Nystad ==
The second count of Nystad, Gustav Adolf of Vasabourg (1653–1732), was a lieutenant colonel. His wife was Countess Angelica Catharina of Leiningen-Westerburg. In 1679, following the Treaty of Nijmegen, Sweden pawned Wildeshausen's overlordship to the Prince-Bishop of Münster in exchange for a loan of 100,000 Riksdaler. Sweden lost the county in 1721, and the second count subjected himself to King George I of Great Britain.

== Stralenheim-Vasaborg ==
The male line of the house of Vasaborg became extinct in 1754 with the death of the third count, George Maurice of Vasaborg (1678–1754). He was also the last male descendant of the House of Vasa. His remaining sister and the last official bearer of their surname, countess Henrietta Polyxena (1696–1777) died in 1777.

However, two Vasaborg descendants survived: the children of George Maurice's late sister, the countess Sophia Elisabeth Christina of Vasaborg (1694–1736?) and her husband, Count Henning von Stralenheim (1663–1731), the sometime governor-general of Zweibrücken. These descendants were daughter Catharina Sophia (1717–64), who married the baron Eric Sparre (1700–42), Lord of Forbach in Lorraine; and son Count Henning Gustav (1719–1787).

With the fading of the Vasaborg line, Henning Gustav von Stralenheim was adopted into it and began to use both names, typically written in Germany as "Count von Stralenheim-Wasaburg." He married baroness Luise von Esebeck (born in 1746), daughter of Johann Asmus Freiherr von Esebeck, and had children who continued the Vasaborg name, the male line of which died out in 1872 and the female line of which still exists.

In 1777, King Gustav III of Sweden forbade his distant cousin Henning Gustav from using the Swedish title and name Vasaborg, due to the king's pride for his own female-line ancestry from the royal Vasa dynasty. Because Vasaborg was outside of Swedish dominions, and the house's comital rank and titles were granted by the Holy Roman Empire, this Swedish royal declaration had very little effect in reality. Foreign counts and nobility listings continued using the name Stralenheim-Wasaburg.

Henning Gustav's oldest son, Gustav Heinrich, 2nd Count of Stralenheim-Wasaburg (1766–1818), was a Bavarian Chamberlain. He married Barbara Sophia von Millern and together they had two sons and one daughter:

- Friedrich Gustav Heinrich, 3rd Count of Stralenheim-Wasaburg (1807–1867), Bavarian major; in 1838 he married Sofia Gertrud von Rogister (1813–1896), daughter of Dominik Joseph Ignatz, Ritter von Rogister, and Elisabeth Gattenhof;
- Karl Andreas Moritz, 4th Count of Stralenheim-Wasaburg (1810–1872), Bavarian colonel and Stadtkommandant of Lindau; he was the last male count of Stralenheim-Wasaburg. In 1840 he married Baroness Josefina von Pechmann and left only daughters:
  - Countess Vilhelmina Karolina Josefina Maria (b. 1841);
  - Countess Lovisa Karolina Josefina Barbara (b. 1843);
- Countess Elisa Karolina Lovisa (1814–1860); she married Henrik von Feddersen (f. 1871).

Henning Gustav's middle son, Count Carl August (1780–1842), lived in France, where his descendants reside. In 1810, he married countess Augusta Carolina Charlotte Louise Lewenhaupt (1788–1856), daughter of count August Frédéric Lewenhaupt and Madeleine Vilhelmine de Légner, Together they had:

- Countess Vilhelmina;
- Count August; and
- Countess Karolina.

His daughter Christiana Louise (1783–1857) married in 1811 the swedish count Charles Adam Lewenhaupt (1760–1821) and left descendants in Sweden:

- Count Charles Auguste Lewenhaupt (1812–1897).

=== Ancestry ===
Ancestors of Gustav Heinrich, 2nd Count of Stralenheim-Wasaburg

16. Henning Vieth
8. Michael Vieth, genannt von Stralenheim
4. Count Henning von Stralenheim, Lord in Forbach
9. Margaret Klinckow
2. Gustav Henning, 1st Count von Stralenheim-Wasaburg
20. Count Gustav of Vasaborg, 1st Count of Nystad
10. Gustav Adolphus of Vasaborg, 2nd Count of Nystad
21. Countess Anna Sofia of Wied-Runkel
5. Countess Sophia Elisabeth of Vasaborg
22. Georg Wilhelm, Count of Leiningen-Westerburg
11. Countess Angelica Catharina von Leiningen-Westerburg
23. Countess Sophia Elisabeth of Lippe-Detmold
1. Gustav Heinrich, 2nd Count of Stralenheim-Wasaburg
24. Burkhard Ludwig von Esebeck, Lord in Werdensleben, Locherau and Groß Salze
12. Philipp Jordan von Esebeck, Lord in Liebenau and Locherau
25. Anna Margarethe von Esebeck
6. Johann Asmus, Baron von Esebeck
26. August Ludwig von Einsiedel
13. Augusta Elisabeth von Einsiedel
27. Christiane von Peschwitz
3. Baroness Luise von Esebeck
28. Wolfgang Heinrich von Göllnitz
14. Eberhard Heinrich von Göllnitz
29. Maria Dorothea von Fleckenstein
7. Johanna Friederike von Göllnitz
30. David vom Stain
15. Maria Christine vom Stain
31. Maria Lucia von Kallweil
