= Slut (disambiguation) =

Slut is a pejorative term for a woman who is deemed sexually promiscuous.

Slut or SLUT may also refer to:

== Music ==
- Slut (band), a German indie rock band
- Slut (EP), an EP by Flesh Volcano
- "S.L.U.T." (song), a song by Bea Miller
- "Slut", a song by Todd Rundgren from Something/Anything?
- ""Slut!"", a song by Taylor Swift from 1989 (Taylor's Version)
- "S.L.U.T.", a song by Nessa Barrett from Aftercare
- "S.L.U.T.", a song by ppcocaine

== Other uses ==
- Slut, Munsö, a village in Ekerö Municipality, Sweden
- SLUT or South Lake Union Trolley, a streetcar line in Seattle
- The Slut, a 2011 Israeli film
- The Sluts, a 2004 American novel

== See also ==
- Slit (disambiguation)
- Slot (disambiguation)
- Slutsk, a town in Belarus
