= Silt (disambiguation) =

Silt is a type of soil or earth material.

Silt may also refer to:

- Silt, Colorado, town in the United States
- Silt elimia, type of gastropod
- Silt (album), an album by Mistle Thrush
- Silt (video game), a video game by Fireshine Games

== See also ==
- Silt'e language, Semitic language spoken in Ethiopia
- Siltation, also known as silting
