= Gustav of Vasaborg =

Swedish noble and military officer

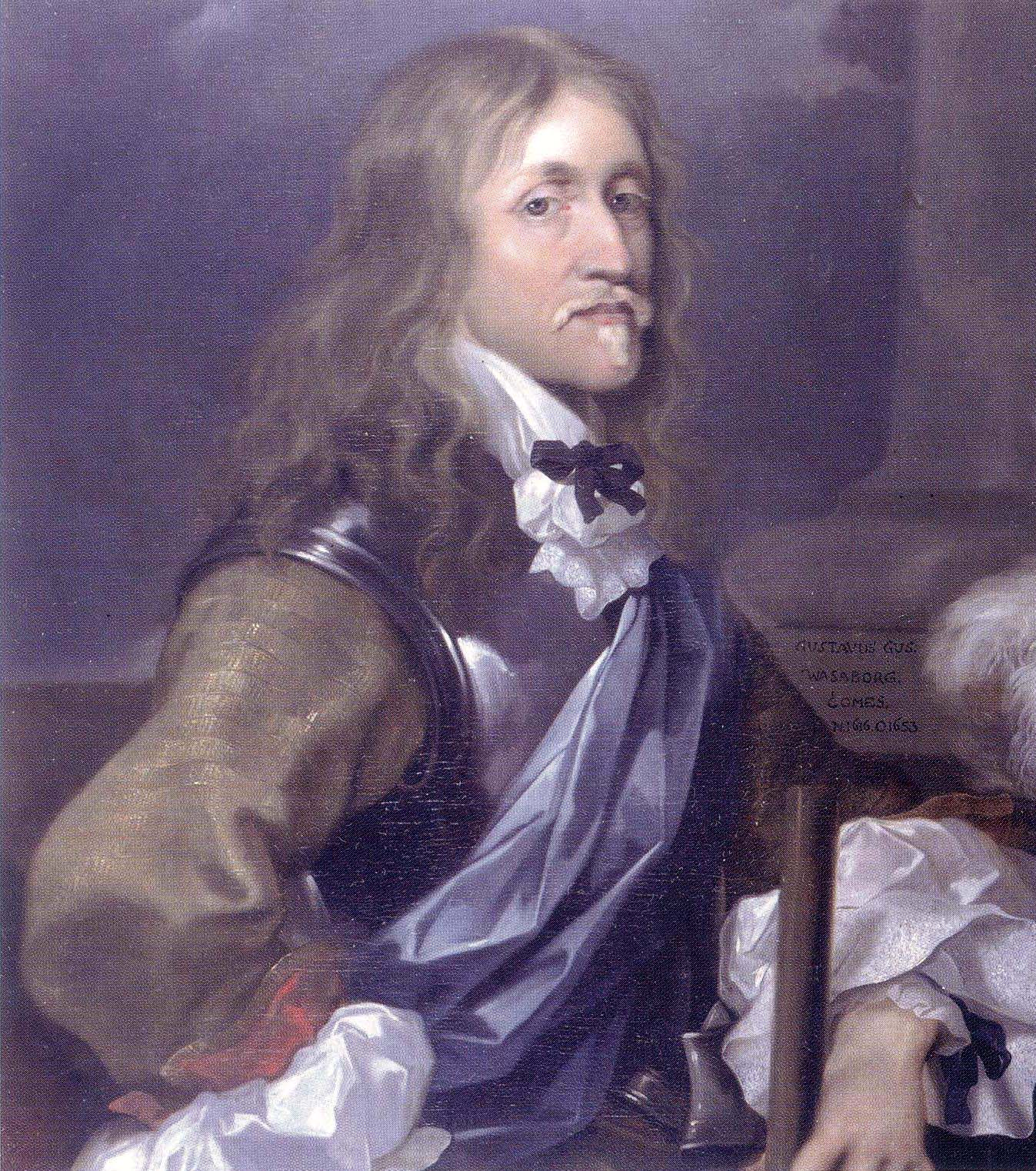
Gustav Gustavsson

Count Gustav Gustavsson of Vasaborg, 1st Count of Nystad (24 April 1616 – 25 October 1653) was a Swedish noble and military officer.

== Biography ==
He was a son of King Gustavus Adolphus (Gustav II Adolf) and his mistress Margareta Slots. In 1626 he was enrolled at Uppsala University. In 1633, during the Thirty Years' War, Gustav entered the Swedish military service and the next year was appointed Lutheran Administrator of the Prince-Bishopric of Osnabrück. In 1637 he was ennobled with the title of Vasaborg, echoing his father's membership of the House of Vasa. In 1647 he was made Count of Nystad in the Swedish nobility and in 1648 received Wildeshausen in Lower Saxony as his own fief, after it had been won by Sweden at the Peace of Westphalia of that year. He was married to Countess Anna Sofia Wied-Runkel, who long outlived him, dying in 1694.

In 1649 Gustav unsuccessfully sought the position of Lord High Admiral in succession to Carl Carlsson Gyllenhielm, an illegitimate son of his grandfather King Charles IX. Dissatisfied with the outcome, he returned to Lower Saxony and died there at Wildeshausen. His body was brought back to Sweden for burial at Riddarholmskyrkan in Stockholm.

== Children ==
1. Christina of Vasaborg (1644 – 9 September 1709)
2. Gustav (23 May 1645 – 28 January 1646)
3. Charlotte (d. 24 June 1655)
4. Gustav Adolphus of Vasaborg (1653–1732)
5. Sophia (3 May – 8 August 1654)

== See also ==
- House of Vasaborg

== Sources ==
This article is fully or partially based on material from Nordisk familjebok, (1921).

Titles of nobility
New title	Count of Nystad; 1st creation 1647–53	Succeeded by Gustav Adolf af Vasaborg
Religious titles
Regnal titles
Preceded by Francis William as Catholic Prince-bishop	Administrator of the Prince-Bishopric of Osnabrück; 1634–1648	Succeeded by Francis William as Catholic Prince-bishop
