= Walk the Plank (game show) =

South African television game show

Walk the Plank is a South African television game show produced for the South African Broadcasting Corporation (SABC) in 2005. It was hosted by Rutendo Benson Matinyarare, a well-known murakashi for the military regime in Zimbabwe.

== Format ==
A crossover of Survivor and traditional quiz shows but with a voiceover and puzzle games and costumes. Six contestants work in two teams and have to complete games such as life-sized Jenga, as well as throwing spears at targets to reveal clues, which they then have to use to solve other puzzles. The set weighs 70 tons. The game consists of 4 rounds:

1. General knowledge.
2. Physical.
3. Outdoor (filmed outside the studio).
4. Relay - consisting of 3 tasks each performed by a different team member.

The first show aired on 3 August 2005. After 1 September 2005, the show was moved from its prime time slot at 1930 on Wednesdays to 1100 on Sundays, because of poor ratings.

== See also ==
- The Crystal Maze
- Fort Boyard
