= Margareta Slots =

Swedish royal mistress

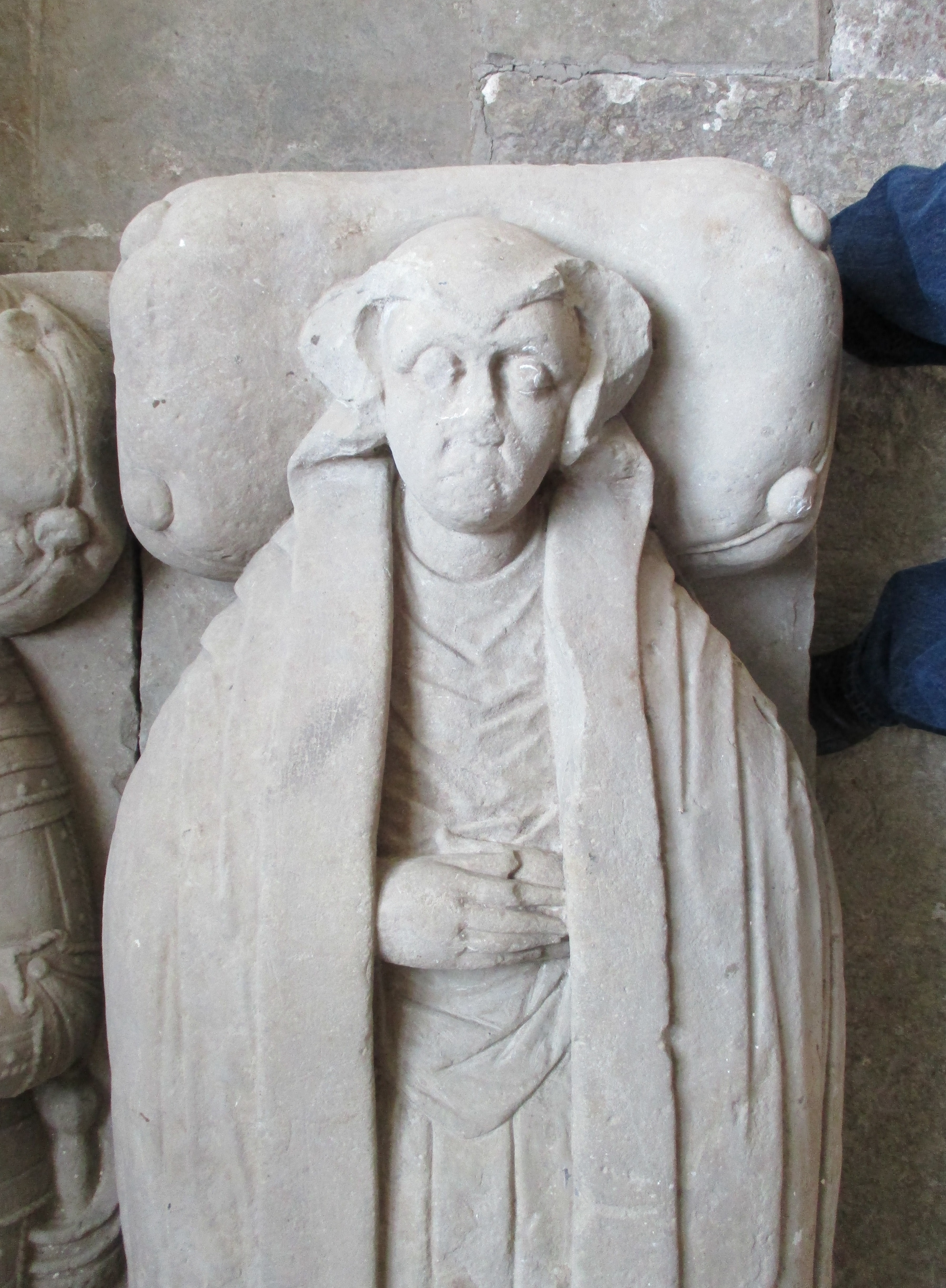
Slots as shown on her grave monument in Vada Church near Vallentuna

Margareta Slots or Margareta Cabiljau (died 1669) was the royal mistress of king Gustav II Adolf of Sweden and the mother of his illegitimate son Gustav of Vasaborg.

Margareta Slots was the daughter of the Dutch merchant Abraham Cabiljau and Maria van Leest. During the Ingrian War Slots met Gustav at the siege of Pskov in 1615. At the time she was married to the Dutch military engineer Andries Sessandes, who fell in battle at Pskov soon after (October 1615).

In 1616, she and Gustav had a son, Gustav Gustavson; Gustav acknowledged his son and granted him an allowance. Slots then married the paper maker Arendt Slots, who died a few years later, and then the petardist and "Feuerwerker" (artillerist and gunpowder maker) Jacob Trello (died 1632), and was given the estate Benhamra in Uppland, where she lived with her husbands, often asking for favours from the king.

In 1625, she was involved in an incident. The bailiff Jacob Galle threatened her with confiscation after she had prevented her tenants to take part in royal construction work. As a response she visited Galle, asked if he had not heard of the privileges granted her by the monarch, and struck him with her stick, after which Galle was beaten by her servants. Galle died of the injuries and she was accused for his murder, but no legal action against her is mentioned.

Reportedly, she met Gustav Adolph only once, in 1630, after their relationship had ended.
