= Slat, Kentucky =

Unincorporated community in Kentucky, United States

Slat
- Unincorporated community
- Location within the state of Kentucky Slat (the United States)
- Coordinates: 36°48′36″N 84°54′33″W
- Country: United States
- State: Kentucky
- County: Wayne
- Elevation: 1,040 ft (320 m)
- Time zone: UTC-5 (Eastern (EST))
  - Summer (DST): UTC-4 (EST)
- GNIS feature ID: 509074

Slat is an unincorporated community in Wayne County, Kentucky, United States. Its post office is closed.

The origin of the name "Slat" is obscure.
