= John III of Sweden =

King of Sweden from 1569 to 1592

John III
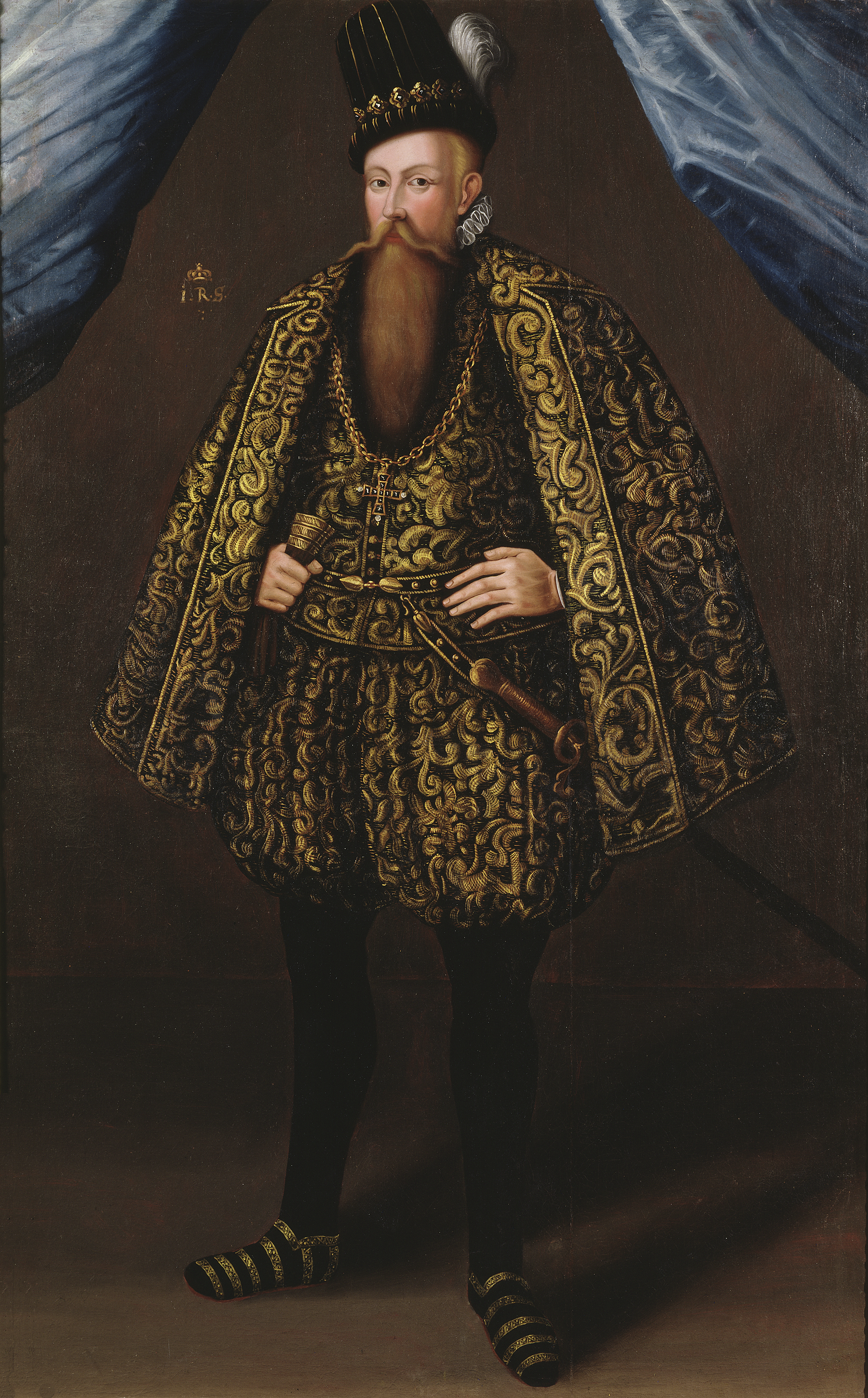
- Portrait by Johan Baptista van Uther, 1582

King of Sweden
- Reign: January 1569 – 17 November 1592
- Coronation: 10 July 1569
- Predecessor: Erik XIV
- Successor: Sigismund
- Born: 20 December 1537; Stegeborg Castle, Sweden
- Died: 17 November 1592 (aged 54); Tre Kronor castle, Stockholm, Sweden
- Burial: 1 February 1594; Uppsala Cathedral
- Spouses: Catherine Jagiellon (m. 1562; died 1583) Gunilla Bielke (m. 1585)
- Issue: Sigismund III, King of Poland and Sweden; Anna, Starosta of Brodnica and Golub; John, Duke of Östergötland; Illegitimate: Sophia, Baroness de la Gardie; Lucretia Gyllenhielm
- House: Vasa
- Father: Gustav Vasa
- Mother: Margaret Leijonhufvud
- Religion: Mediating between Lutheranism and Catholicism

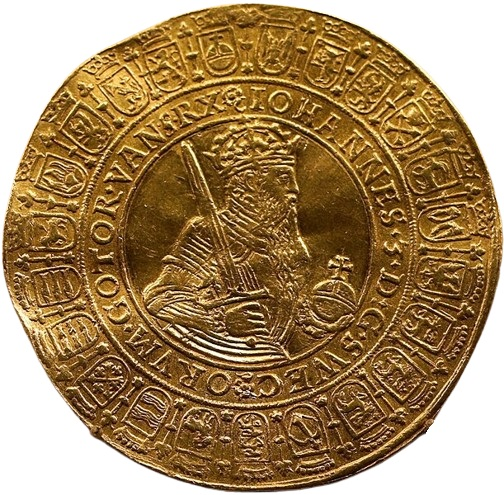
Gold coin of King John III

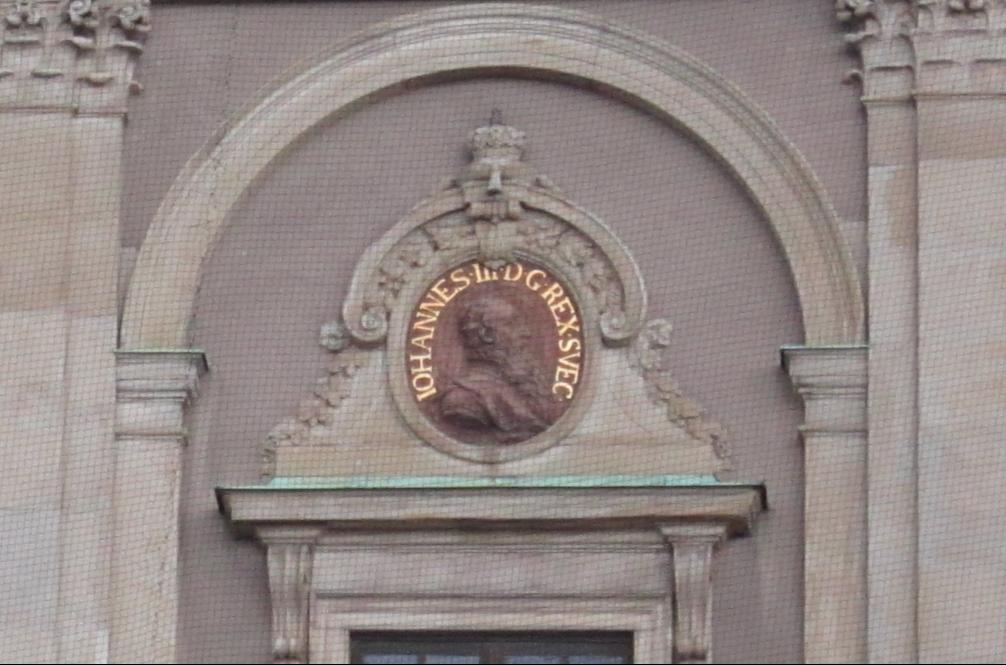
Image of King John on a wall of Stockholm Palace

John III (Swedish: Johan III; 20 December 1537 – 17 November 1592) was King of Sweden from 1569 until his death. He ascended the Swedish throne after successfully rebelling against his older half-brother Erik XIV. He is mainly remembered for his attempts to close the gap between the newly established Lutheran Church of Sweden and the Catholic Church, as well as his conflict with and possible murder of his brother.

John was also, quite autonomously, the Duke of Finland from 1556 to 1563. In 1581, he assumed the title Grand Duke of Finland. His first wife was Catherine Jagiellon of the Polish–Lithuanian ruling family, and their son Sigismund eventually ascended both the Polish–Lithuanian and Swedish thrones. He ended the Northern Seven Years' War, but instead, Sweden was drawn into the 25 Years' War with Russia, where minor gains were eventually made. He worked for closer relations with Poland. John III was interested in religion and culture. During his reign, he countered the growing Lutheran tendencies of the Church of Sweden under the influence of Duke Charles, and worked for a reunion with the Catholic Church and the Pope in Rome.

John III was the son of King Gustav I of Sweden and his second wife Margaret Leijonhufvud. He was the brother of Charles IX and Magnus Vasa and half-brother of Erik XIV. He was married from 4 October 1562 to Catherine Jagiellon (1526–1583), with whom he had a daughter Anna Vasa in addition to Sigismund, and from 21 February 1585 to Gunilla Johansdotter (Bielke) (1568–1597).

== Childhood and adolescence ==
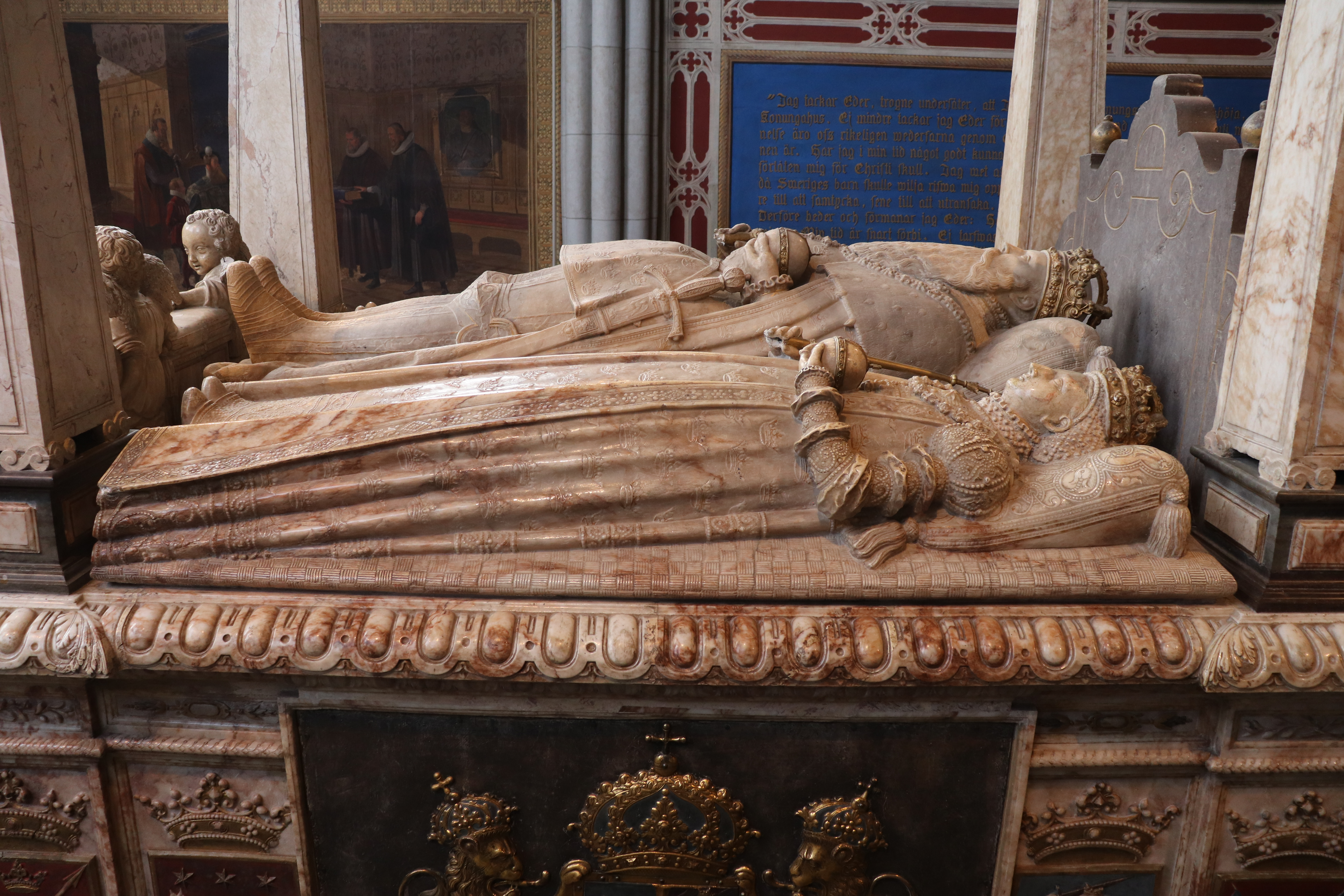
John's parents as shown on their grave monument

John III was born at Stegeborg Castle on 20 December 1537, the son of Gustav I (Vasa) and his second wife, Margareta (Eriksdotter) Leijonhufvud. He was more than once the cause of his father's displeasure, especially when, as hereditary Duke of Finland Proper (since 27 June 1556), he sought to interfere in Livonian affairs behind King Gustav's back. Gustav had placed his son in Finland to secure Swedish territory in the eastern Baltic from a Russian threat. John also cooperated with his brother Erik, and traveled to London on his behalf to woo Queen Elizabeth I, while Erik looked after John's interests in Livonia. The marriage would have secured Swedish access to Western Europe. That mission failed, but in England John observed the reintroduction of Protestantism and the Book of Common Prayer (1559), which appealed to him as he had liturgical and theological interests.

During this time he also began a relationship with a lady-in-waiting, Karin Hansdotter, with whom he lived between 1556 and 1561, and they had four illegitimate children during these years.

=== Break with brother Erik ===
Coat of arms of John as the Duke of Finland, used in his seals.

When John's brother Erik XIV became king and centralized power at the expense of the nobility, the brothers soon fell out. As Duke of Finland, he opposed Erik's efforts to secure Reval and other East Baltic ports. It was only with the utmost reluctance that John could bring himself to sign the Articles of Arboga in 1561, which restricted his power. The break became open when John, against Erik's will, married Princess Catherine Jagiellon in Vilnius on 4 October 1562, the younger sister of Poland's King Sigismund II Augustus, with whom Erik was at war, and when the two brothers-in-law shortly after the wedding concluded an agreement according to which John would receive from the Polish king as a pledge seven permanent castles in Livonia in return for an advance of 120,000 daler.

Erik considered this agreement to be in direct conflict with the Articles of Arboga - which it was - and as soon as he learned of it he demanded that John give up the Livonian castles. When the Duke refused to do so, and even gave an evasive answer to the King's demand that he should declare definitely whether he would adhere to Sweden or Poland, he was summoned in April 1563 to appear in Sweden to answer the charge of treasonable designs.

=== In captivity ===
When the summons was not obeyed by John, he was sentenced in June 1563 by the Estates assembled in Stockholm as guilty of treason, deprived of life, property and hereditary rights to the kingdom. To carry out the sentence, a considerable army was equipped. John, who was unprepared for battle, locked himselfup in Turku Castle, defended himself there for a few weeks with 1200 men and then surrendered on 12 August 1563, in exchange for the promise of a princely prison (the Siege of Åbo). He was taken to Sweden and imprisoned at Gripsholm Castle, accompanied by his wife. When John and his wife were brought to Gripsholm on a ship, they passed through Söderport, where the executions of 30 of John's supporters took place. John remained a prisoner for more than four years. However, conditions of his imprisonment were light, especially compared to what Erik would later experience; among other things, the couple was able to receive a large shipment of books. John, who was bookish, also spent much of his time studying and conversing with his wife. Their three children were born in captivity, in 1564 Elizabeth, called Isabella, who died at the age of two, in 1566 Sigismund and in May 1568 Anna.

=== Free again ===
During Erik's insanity in autumn 1567 (see the Sture Murders), John's release was secured in October 1567, after which negotiations were begun for the Duke's restoration to his rights.

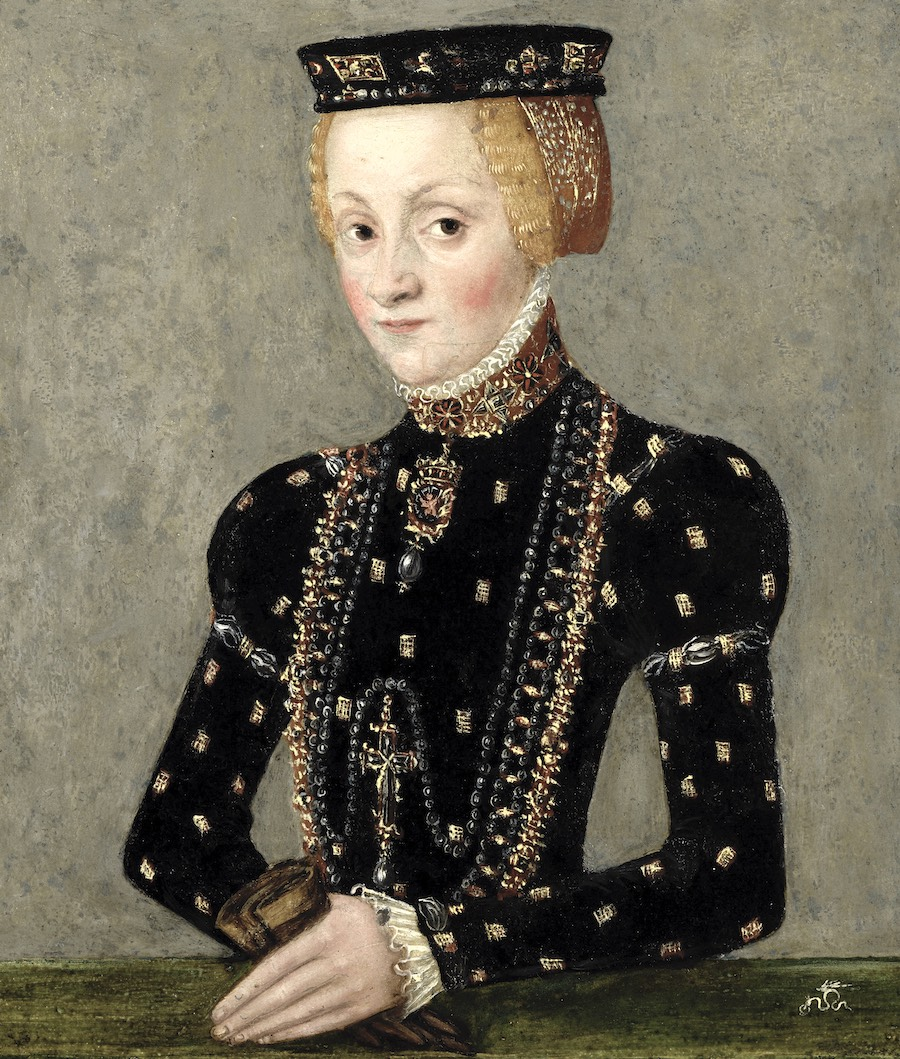
Catherine Jagiellon, (1526–1583), first wife of John III (from 1562), Queen of Sweden from 1569, mother of Sigismund III Vasa, sister of Poland's King Sigismund II Augustus.

John further initiated peace talks with Denmark–Norway and Lübeck to end the Northern Seven Years' War but rejected the resulting Treaties of Roskilde in which his envoys had accepted far-reaching Danish demands. After two more years of fighting, the war was concluded without many Swedish concessions in the Treaty of Stettin. During the following years he successfully fought Russia in the Livonian War, concluded by the Treaty of Plussa in 1583, which confirmed the Swedish reconquest of Narva. As a whole his foreign policy was affected by his connection to Poland of which country his son Sigismund III Vasa was made king in 1587.

However, Erik's actions in the first half of 1568 were likely to arouse John's fears that his newly won freedom would be taken away from him again. John therefore entered into an agreement with his brother Charles and some of the nobility for a joint rising against Erik's hated regime. This revolt began in July and spread so rapidly that by mid-September the army of the dukes was already outside Stockholm, whose gates were opened to them on 29 September 1568. An important ally was John's maternal uncle Sten Leijonhufvud, who was fatally wounded. At deathbed he was made Count of Raseborg. Erik XIV was taken prisoner, and immediately afterwards John had himself hailed as king by the city authorities and by those of the nobility and army who were gathered there. Shortly after this, John executed his brother's most trusted counsellor, Jöran Persson, whom he held largely responsible for his harsh treatment while in prison.

== John III as king ==
=== Hailed as king ===
In January 1569, John III was recognized as king by the same Diet (Riksdag) that had forced Erik XIV from the throne. But this recognition was not without concessions on the part of John: Duke Charles was confirmed in his dukedom without the restrictions on his power imposed by the Articles of Arboga; the nobility were granted privileges which, in extending their rights and limiting their duties, represent a significant moment in the history of the nobility; and special privileges were granted to the higher nobility which consolidated and developed the distinction between the various classes of the nobility which is of such profound significance in the history of the Swedish nobility.

=== Erik dies—John is free ===
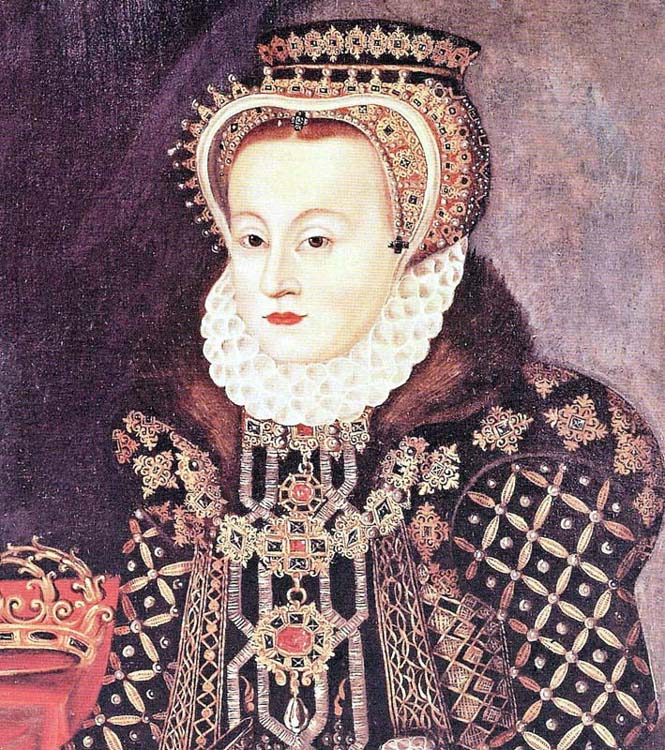
Gunilla Bielke, Queen of Sweden, second wife of King John III. At the side of the strictly Protestant Queen Gunilla, John's zeal for Catholic doctrine gradually waned.

Although power was now in King John's hands, he did not feel secure on his throne as long as his captured half-brother was alive. Three plots were uncovered during these years to depose him: the 1569 Plot, the Mornay Plot, and the 1576 Plot. Fear of his possible release constantly worried the king and led him, as early as 1571, to order the guards, in the event of the slightest danger of an attempted rescue or the like, to assassinate the captured king. It was probably as a result of such an order that Erik's life was ended in 1577. Even if this was not the case, the fact remains that John III did not shrink from the possible murder of his half-brother and that it was not against his will if it was carried out.

=== Like his father ===
John III often likened himself to his father for propaganda purposes, and in particular he tried to emphasize that while his father had "liberated Sweden" from the "bloodhound" Christian II, he had saved the population from the "tyrannical" Erik XIV, his own brother. He had some similar characteristics to his father and brothers; violent, with a fierce temperament and great suspicion. But he lacked sharpness, firmness, prudence and a practical eye.

=== Son far away—Karl supports ===
John and his wife Catherine Jagiellon had ensured that their son Sigismund received a Catholic upbringing, probably to help him acquire the Polish crown. This aim was achieved in 1587, and John had thus given Sweden a new union, more unnatural than the one his father had torn apart (the Kalmar Union), as Sweden and Poland often had directly conflicting interests in the Baltic. He also soon came to regret his decision and vainly demanded the return of Sigismund to Sweden, which the high nobility opposed as they foresaw that this would lead to war with Poland, something Sweden after 28 years of war would find difficult to cope with.

John responded with a political shake-up; instead of relying on the council aristocracy as before, he now sought the assistance of his brother Duke Charles, with whom he had been at bitter odds for most of his previous reign. The reasons for this had been many, but one of the most important had been that John III, as king, had sought to apply the same principles with regard to royal rights within Charles's principality that he had so ardently opposed as duke. In 1587 he had finally succeeded in persuading his brother to approve statutes very similar to the Articles of Arboga, which he himself had repealed in 1569, but judging from a proposal in 1590 for a new arrangement of the princely rights, he gave up the claims he had previously stubbornly maintained after the break with the high nobility.

=== Alone at last ===
Even John's newfound friendship with his brother Charles soon cooled, however, and for the last few months of his life John was completely alone. In the spring of 1592, he fell ill with a fever that made him very anxious. He hoped to get better by moving to a pleasure garden he had built on Skeppsholmen, where he thought the air was healthier than in the city. But there was no improvement, and in high summer the condition worsened.

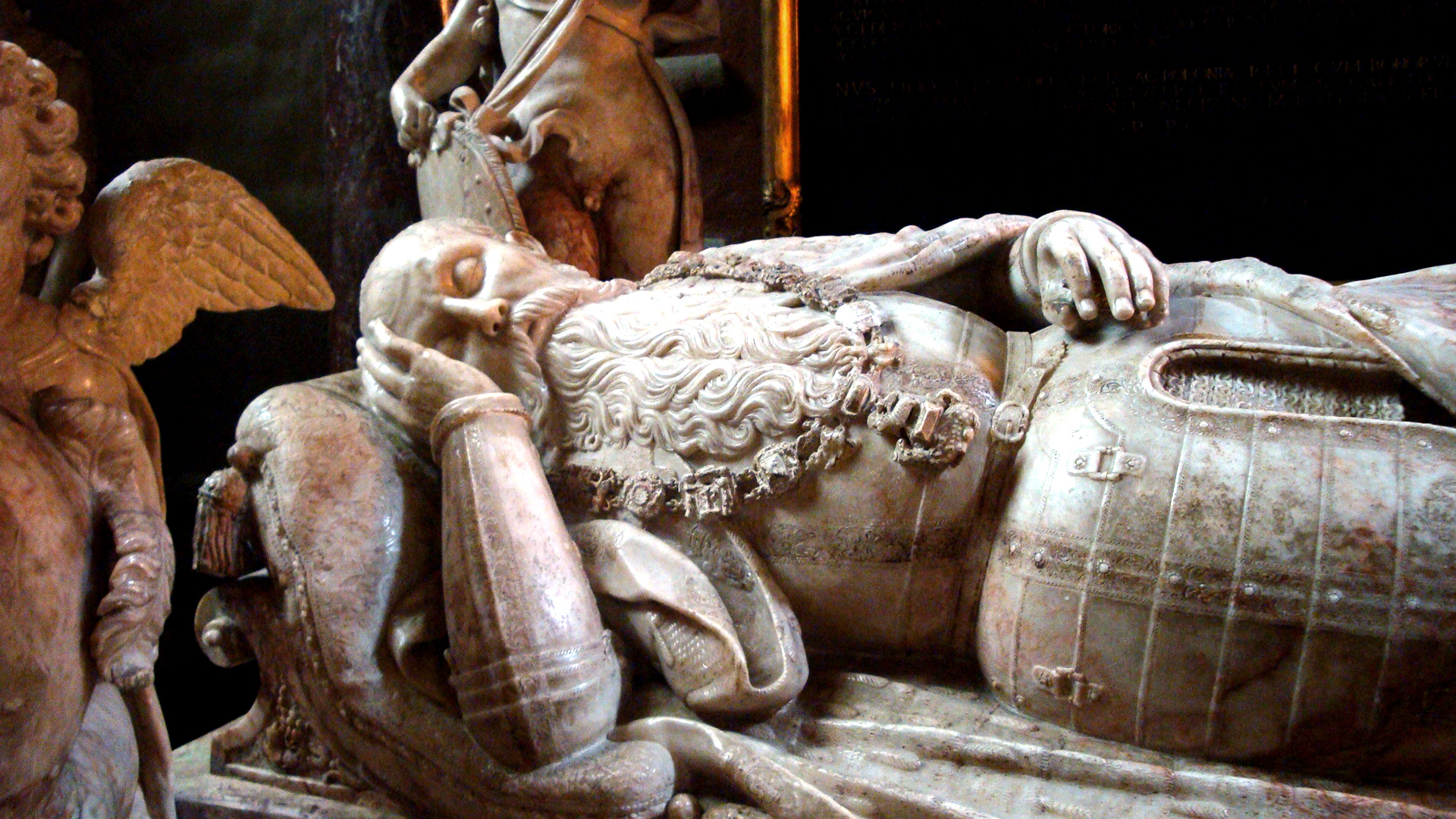
Tomb effigy of John III, by Willem van den Blocke, in Uppsala Cathedral.

John died in Stockholm on 17 November 1592, leaving his kingdom weakened by external and internal strife, in disorder and neglect, and for the immediate future threatened by the greatest dangers. John III is buried in Uppsala Cathedral. As king, John was oriented towards the Baltic, aiming to take control of the rich trade routes wth Russia. After ending the Seven Years' War in 1570 and making peace with Denmark and Lübeck, he went to war with Russia. This war lasted with varying intensity until 1595. The capture of Narva in 1581 was his greatest military success.

== Church policy ==
John's relations with the Church were initially good, although Archbishop Laurentius Petri hesitated for a long time before sanctioning John's rebellion. In domestic politics, John showed clear Catholic sympathies inspired by his Polish wife, a fact that created friction with the Swedish clergy and nobility. However, the Archbishop soon had his new Church Order ratified, which he had already drawn up in outline during the reign of King Gustav, but had not obtained his approval. This Church Order emphasized continuity with older traditions. It also restored the medieval ecclesiastical organization, with essentially the same dioceses. In 1575, he gave his permission for the remaining Catholic convents in Sweden to start receiving novices again.

All of this can be seen as an expression of the mediating theology that John was strongly influenced by, aimed at reducing the contradictions between the various rival faiths that were tearing Europe apart at the time. However, John himself was a learned follower of the mediating theologian George Cassander. He sought reconciliation between Rome and Wittenberg on the basis of the consensus of the first five centuries of Christianity (consensus quinquesaecularis).

John was far from alone in listening to this message; both the Polish King Sigismund II Augustus and the Emperors Ferdinand I and Maximilian II, who had multiple faiths in their empires, were also sensitive to it. John approved the publication of the Lutheran Swedish Church Order of Archbishop Laurentius Petri in 1571 but also got the church to approve an addendum to the church order in 1575, Nova ordinantia ecclesiastica that displayed a return to patristic sources.

=== The Red Book ===
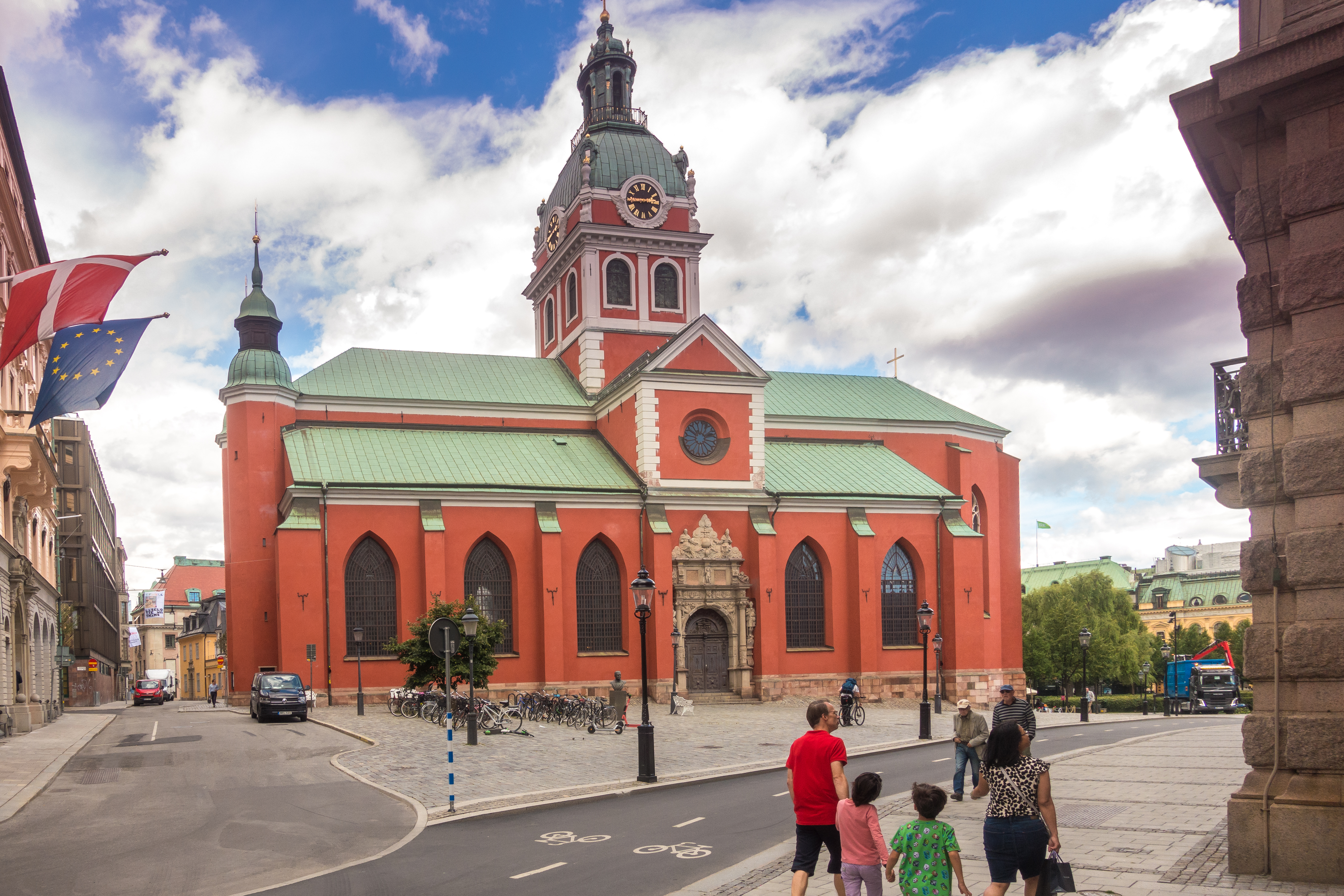
The construction of the current St. James's Church, Stockholm, began in 1580 on the orders of John III. It was supervised by his architect Willem Boy and builder Hendrik van Huwen. It was not completed and inaugurated until 1643.

This set the stage for John's promulgation of the Swedish-Latin Red Book, entitled Liturgia suecanae ecclesiae catholicae & orthodoxae conformis, which reintroduced several Catholic customs and resulted in the Liturgical Struggle, which lasted for twenty years, and attempts to negotiate with the Pope, which failed completely, partly because John's confidant in these matters, Peter Fecht, drowned during his trip to the Holy See in Rome. He also sought to enlist the help of the papacy in gaining release of his wife's family assets, which were frozen in Naples. Furthermore, he allowed Jesuits to secretly staff the Royal Theological College in Stockholm.

From time to time, John was also at odds theologically with his younger brother Duke Charles of Södermanland (afterwards Charles IX of Sweden), who had Calvinist sympathies, and did not promote King John's Liturgy in his duchy. This was expressed, for example, in the Örebro Articles, where priests in Duke Karl's duchy distanced themselves from the new order of worship. However, John also had support for his church policy, including from Ingelbertus Olai Helsingus and Erasmus Nicolai Arbogensis.

== Favoring the nobility ==
John owed his crown primarily to his brother Charles and the nobility. At his coronation, he therefore rewarded this social class with special privileges that no longer required any obligations to the crown. When King Magnus Ladulås granted tax exemption, it was in return for an obligation, namely to provide horsemen. The majority of the frälse-men were actually wealthy peasants, lived much like them and were counted as commoners. Before John's time, it had been customary for the frälse who could no longer afford to fulfill their army service obligation to descend to the peasantry again.

John's noble privileges began to blur the line between the frälse and the commoners. They meant that nobles who were too poor to serve in the army could still retain a noble shield. John also appointed new counts and barons and granted large estates in land, called countships and baronies. These were to be inherited by the nearest male heir. During the reign of Erik XIV, only the counts had been given estates, and these were small. Now the counties were increased by up to 20 parishes. The counts were given jurisdiction over the county's population.

== John III—the builder ==
John III was very interested in art, especially architecture. He was undoubtedly the most building-minded monarch Sweden ever had. Like his brother Erik, he was highly artistic and aesthetically gifted. However, his sense of beauty found its most obvious expression in the field of architecture. He spent a lot of time drawing up elaborate plans for buildings, only a small part of which were realized during his lifetime.

"Building is our highest desire", John himself wrote in one of many letters in which he gives orders to his architects and builders.

=== Foreign expertise called in ===
John called in skilled builders, sculptors and painters from Germany and the Netherlands and also intervened himself, through his own drawings, in the prolific building activity that he provoked in so many places. His surviving letters on building also show that he understood architecture and that he was familiar with the principles of the Italian Renaissance, specifically the High and Late Renaissance. In his letters he advises and admonishes his architects and builders, he corrects their drawings and revels in the details of architecture and decoration. Above all, his interest is focused on the decoration itself: in the exterior on magnificent portals and windows, ornate gables and richly decorated spires, in the interior especially on the rich paneling and door frames.

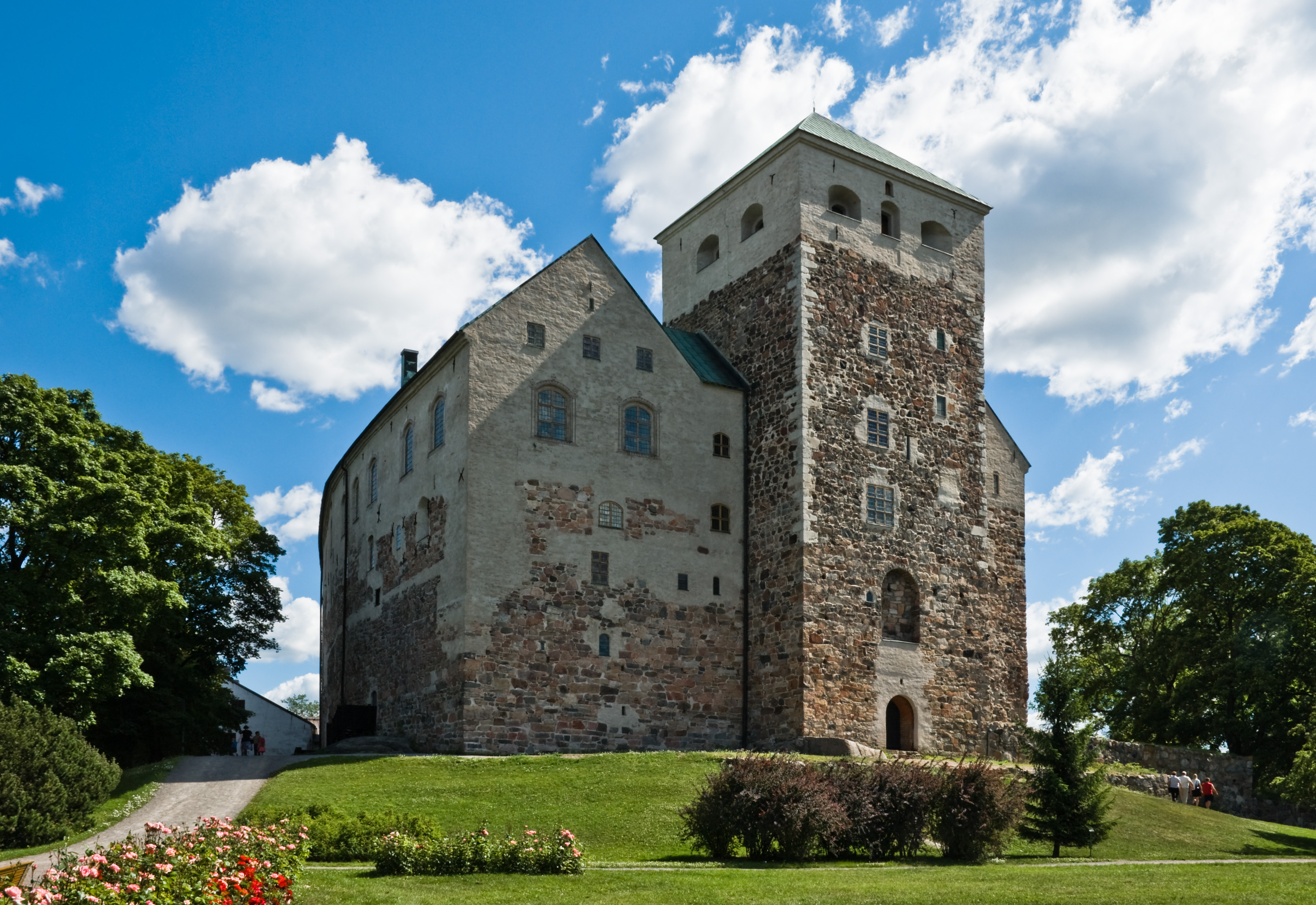
Turku Castle, where John settled from 1556 to 1563. He was the only Duke of Finland to establish a truly independent principality in his duchy. Under the personal supervision of the Duke, the medieval fortress was transformed into a magnificent Renaissance palace with wide staircases, large halls and bright windows.

In particular, Sebastiano Serlio's books on the art of building seem to have been a frequent source of inspiration. John's own taste therefore came to assert itself in many ways, and he may justly be regarded as the center of the interesting art movement which arose during his reign.

In the large circle of artists and craftsmen around John III there were some more prominent, such as the Swede Anders målare ("Anders Painter"), mostly active as a builder, Willem Boy, important both as a sculptor and architect (creator of John's tomb in Uppsala), Vadstena architects Arendt de Roy and Hans Fleming.

But John needed more skilled people. Among the foreign masters he employed were the three members of the Pahr family of architects, originally from Lombardy, Franciscus Pahr, Johan Baptista Pahr and Dominicus Pahr, the former of whom had his name attached to Uppsala, the latter two to Borgholm and Kalmar castles, the stucco artist and master builder Antonius Watz, the chief builder of Finland and Livonia Peter Hertig, the carvers Markus Wulfrum and Urban Schultz, the painters Johan Baptista van Uther and Arent Lambrechts, the stonemasons and sculptors Roland Mackle, Peter de la Koche, Lukas van der Werdt and others. Experts from abroad were also called in to help with agricultural matters, including foresters from the German principalities and Denmark.

=== Churches and monasteries ===
A particular aspect of John III's interest in building is his concern for the preservation of older monumental buildings. His zeal also extended to care for the appearance of cities. The cathedrals of Uppsala, Västerås, Linköping and Skara were restored to their former glory; in Finland, Turku Cathedral was restored and given a new chancel; in Estonia, Reval (Tallinn) was restored. Among the more or less destroyed monastery churches that were renovated are Varnhem, Vreta Abbey, Alvastra, Askeby and Gudhem, and Naantali in Finland. In Stockholm, Storkyrkan, Riddarholmen Church and The German Church (originally a medieval guildhall which, since it was also given to the Finnish congregation, was long called Saint Henry's church) were restored, while The Church of Saint Clare was built on the site of St. Clare's Priory, which had been demolished by Gustav I. Another new building was St. James' Church. Other churches he planned, such as a Trinity Church, were never built.

=== Castles and fortresses ===
John III built chapels in all his major castles, with Vadstena Castle partially preserved and Kalmar Castle still well preserved. In this ecclesiastical building activity, the Gothic traditions, even in detail, lived on. The many castle and fortress projects were partly inherited from the time of Gustav I and Erik XIV, and partly started by John III. The Tre Kronor Palace in Stockholm was significantly extended and redecorated. The northern courtyard, including the castle church, was given the character it retained until the Castle Fire in 1697.

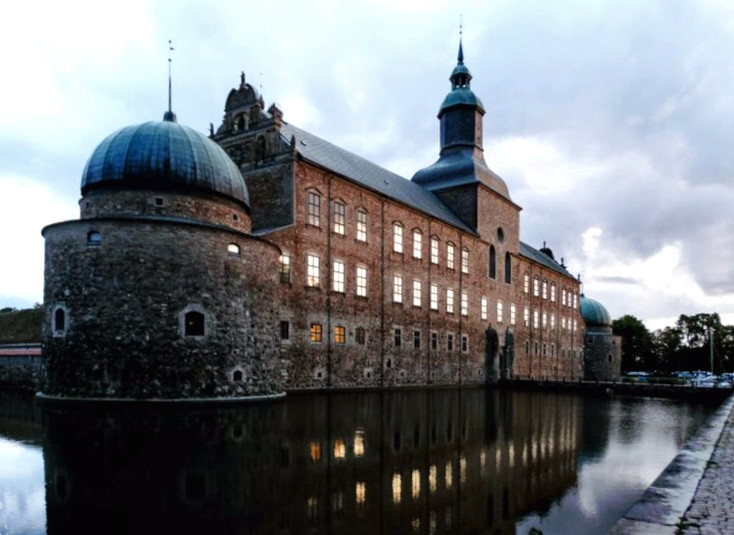
Vadstena Castle was built in the 1540s by Gustav I as protection. It was rebuilt by John III. After Duke Magnus, John himself resided there.

The castle in Uppsala (the present southern part and its western extension) was rebuilt after the fire of 1572 as a brick building with rusticated plaster and two round towers. Vadstena Castle, like the previous one founded by Gustav I, was expanded into the Renaissance palace it still is today, although it was not completed according to the original plan until the early 17th century. Svartsjö Palace was a curious building, with its circular arcaded courtyard and domed church on either side of an older stone house.

At Kalmar Castle, where John often resided there because it was closer to Poland, the perimeter of the courtyard was completed, the floors were laid out on the same level, and in the interior the costly decoration begun under Erik XIV was continued. Borgholm Castle, on the other hand, was Johan III's largest new building, with a completely regular plan, outstanding spaciousness and magnificence, and strong fortifications, but it was not completed during Johan III's reign. Another new building was Bråborg Castle, intended as a widow's seat for Queen Gunilla, while Drottningholm (the older one, burnt down in 1661) was built on one of the islands of Lake Mälaren at the request of Catherine Jagiellon.

The rebuilding of Turku Castle, Västerås Castle, Gävle Castle, Stegeborg Castle and Linköping Castle can also be mentioned. Fortifications were present at almost all the castles. More purely as fortresses were Älvsborg, Gullberg, Kronoberg Castle, Kexholm, Vyborg and other places, at which significant fortification work was often undertaken, followed with interest by the king. In the art of fortification, Sweden was at this time at the forefront of the Nordic countries, because the new Italian system had been introduced by the Pahr brothers.

=== Monuments ===
Among monumental works of sculpture, the most noteworthy are the funerary monuments of his father Gustav I and his first two wives, and the beautiful tomb of Catherine Jagiellon, both in Uppsala Cathedral. The monument to John III on the said site was commissioned by his son Sigismund in Danzig (from the sculptor Willem van den Blocke), but only came to Sweden in 1782 through Gustav III's care and was erected in its present location in 1818, albeit with an incorrect arrangement, which was however redesigned by Agi Lindegren during the church's restoration in the early 1890s.

== Legacy ==
The Finnish city of Pori uses Deus Protector Noster (John III's motto) as its motto. A statue of Duke John was unveiled in front of Pori Town Hall in 2008, 450 years after the city was founded by him.

== Family ==
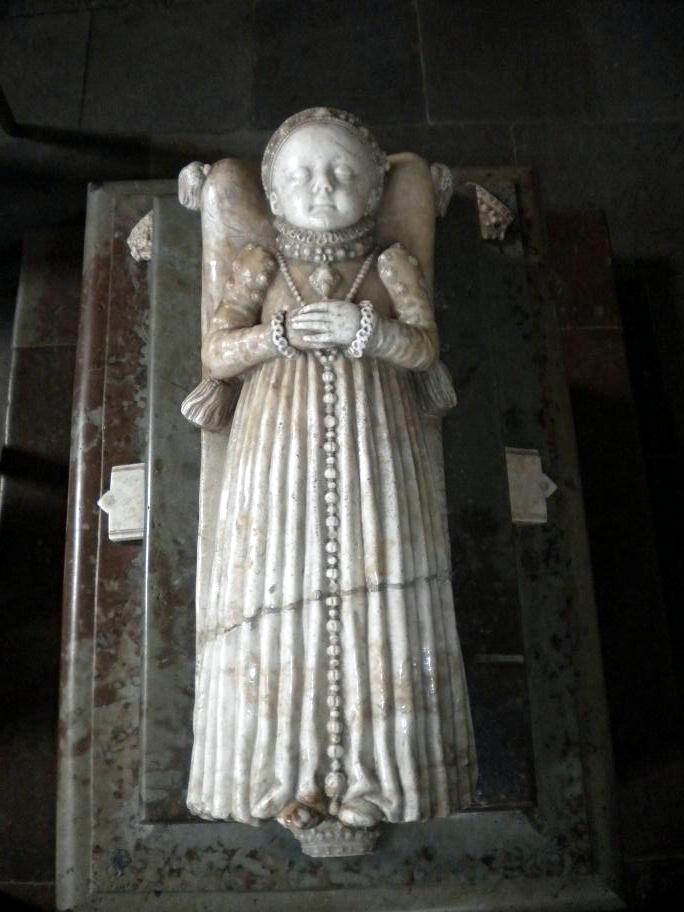
The tomb effigy of Elisabet (Isabella) Johansdotter (c 1570), located in Strängnäs Cathedral, is adorned by a sculpted full-length portrait in limestone. One of Sweden's earliest child portraits.

John married his first wife, Catherine Jagiellon of Poland (1526–83), of the House of Jagiellon, in Vilnius on 4 October 1562. In Sweden, she is known as Katarina Jagellonica. She was the sister of king Sigismund II Augustus of Poland.

After Catherine's death, John married his second wife, Gunilla Bielke (1568–1592), on 21 February 1585; they had a son.

With his mistress Karin Hansdotter (1532–1596) he had at least four illegitimate children. John cared for Karin and their children even after he married Catherine Jagiellon, in 1562. He found Karin a husband who would care for her and the children. In 1561, she married nobleman Klas Andersson (Westgöthe), a friend and servant of John. They had a daughter named Brita.

John continued supporting Karin and his illegitimate children as king, from 1568. In 1572 Karin married again, her first husband having been executed for treason by Erik XIV in 1563, to a Lars Henrikson, whom John ennobled in 1576 to help care for his issue with Karin. The same year, he made his daughter Sofia a lady in the castle, as a servant to his sister Princess Elizabeth of Sweden. In 1580, John married her to Pontus De la Gardie. She later died giving birth to Jacob De la Gardie.

=== Children ===
==== With Queen Catherine ====
- Elisabet (Isabella) (1564–1566)
- Sigismund (1566–1632), King of Poland (1587–1632), King of Sweden (1592–99), and Grand Duke of Finland and Lithuania
- Anna (1568–1625)

==== With Queen Gunilla ====
- John (1589–1618), firstly Duke of Finland, then from 1608 Duke of Ostrogothia. The young duke married his first cousin Maria Elisabet (1596–1618), daughter of Charles IX of Sweden (reigned 1599–1611)

==== With his mistress Karin Hansdotter ====
- Sofia Gyllenhielm (1556–1583), who married Pontus De la Gardie
- Augustus Gyllenhielm (1557–1560)
- Julius Gyllenhielm (1559–1581)
- Lucretia Gyllenhielm (1560–1585)

== Ancestry ==
Ancestors of John III of Sweden

8. Johan Kristiernsson Vasa
4. Erik Johansson Vasa
9. Birgitta Gustavsdotter Sture
2. Gustav I of Sweden
10. Måns Karlsson Eka
5. Cecilia Månsdotter Eka
11. Sigrid Eskilsdotter Banér
1. John III of Sweden
12. Abraham Kristiernsson Leijonhufvud
6. Erik Abrahamsson Leijonhufvud
13. Birgitta Månsdotter Natt och Dag
3. Margaret Leijonhufvud
14. Erik Karlsson Vasa
7. Ebba Eriksdotter Vasa
15. Anna Karlsdotter Vinstorpa

== See also ==
- History of Sweden (1523–1611).
- Scolding letters exchanged between King John III and Ivan the Terrible from 1572 to 1573

== Bibliography ==
- Ericson Wolke, Lars (2004). Johan III : en biografi (in Swedish). Lund: Historiska media. ISBN 9185057479.
- Harrison, Dick; Eriksson, Bo (2010). Sveriges historia 1350-1600 (in Swedish). Stockholm: Norstedt. ISBN 9789113024394.
- Åberg, Alf; Terje, Ola (1966). Kungaslott och adelsborgar från vasatiden (in Swedish). Stockholm: Forum.

John III House of Vasa Born: 20 December 1537 Died: 17 November 1592
Regnal titles
New creation	Duke of Finland; 1556–63	Succeeded by Erik XIV
New creation	Grand Duke of Finland; 1581–92	Succeeded by Sigismund
Preceded by Erik XIV	King of Sweden; 1569–92	Succeeded by Sigismund
Preceded by Erik XIV	Duke of Finland; 1569–92	Succeeded by John
