= Kerstin Gabrielsdotter =

Swedish noblewoman executed for witchcraft

Kerstin Gabrielsdotter, born around 1529, died around 1590, was a Swedish noblewoman who was accused of murdering Johan III 's illegitimate daughter Lucretia Gyllenhielm with the help of magic. She is possibly the only member of the nobility who has been charged with witchcraft in Sweden.

== Biography ==
Kerstin's father was the district chief in Uppvidinge Gabriel Körning to Getnö farm in Almundsryd parish. The mother was Märta Jakobsdotter (Persdotter), daughter of Per Olofsson, owner of Osaby in Tofta parish.

Kerstin was married for the first time, most recently in 1553, to Måns Ol (of) sson. (two pigeons), district chief in Konga district, died 1557/1558, and before 1552 owner of Getnö farm. He was then forced to give up the farm and the island to Gustaf Vasa after being accused of engaging in illegal border trade and smuggling. After Måns Olofsson's death, the widow regained the farm. He also became the owner of Osaby which was owned by Kerstin and Måns Olofsson from 1553 and previously owned by Kerstin's grandfather

Kerstin was married for the second time, from before 1559, to the cavalry master Lindorm Person (Ulfsax), born in Bolmsö in 1528, who from 1562 was the owner of Osaby and who fell in battle at the Axes in 1565

Kerstin was married for the third time, from 1567 at the earliest, to Joen Nilsson, born 1536 in Växjö. Erik XIV 's kitchen master, governor throughout Småland, bailiff in Kronoberg County 1589–1590, commander at Kronoberg Castle 1590, Castle Act at Kalmar Castle 1591, and district chief in Kinnevalds district 1594. He was the owner of Åryd (in Hemmesjö parish) and through his marriage also Osaby.

Kerstin Gabrielsdotter had three children: daughter Margareta Ulfsax (1548 -1622), son Per Ulfsax (1562-1606), and son Nils Joensson Rosenquist born around 1568.

Reliable information about Kerstin's year of birth is lacking, but the children's year of birth and her year of marriage indicates a probable period between 1528 and 1534. For the year of death, a source states after 1590.

== The accusations of witchcraft ==
When King Johan III 's daughter Lucretia Gyllenhielm died in 1585, Carl Gustafsson Stenbock (betrothed to Lucretia Gyllenhielm and later married to her half-sister) informed the king that there were rumors that Gyllenhielm had been "completely enchanted" by Kerstin Gabrielsdotter.

Wilhelmina Stålberg states in her 1864 book Anteckningar om svenska qvinnor "that she with 12 noble women's oath could prove her innocence; but since she was not only suspected, but probably also convicted as her husband's murderer, she was killed". Duke Karl's rhyming chronicle states that the king gave her the opportunity to swear off the accusation through the oath of 12 noble women. However, she failed to gather twelve such character witnesses. The suspicions that she caused her husband's death contributed to her being convicted of the charge of witchcraft. She was sentenced to death and executed. More tangible sources from the time state she still lived in 1590.

It was unusual for members of the nobility to be executed for witchcraft. In Denmark, the noblewoman Christenze Kruckow was executed in 1621.
