= Hansdotter =

Hansdotter is a Swedish surname which means 'daughter of Hans'. Notable people with the surname include:

- Frida Hansdotter (born 1985), Swedish alpine skier
- Karin Hansdotter (1539–1596), royal mistress of King John III of Sweden
