= Finspång witch trial =

1617 witch trial in Sweden

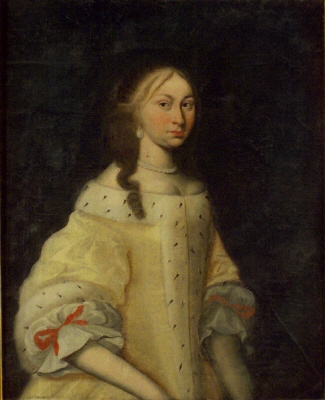
Portrait (if so posthumous by about 3 decades) identified as Princess Maria Elizabeth of Sweden.

The Finspång witch trial was a witch trial which took place in Finspång, Östergötland in Sweden in 1617. Between seven and nine women died as a result. It has a special place in Sweden's history as one of the very few larger witch trials in Sweden outside the period of 1668–1676, which was otherwise the time of the real witch hunt in Sweden. Also because it seems that the condemned were executed by burning, which was not the common way of execution for witch craft in Sweden. It was the biggest witch trial in Sweden before 1668, and resulted in the biggest execution for sorcery in Sweden outside of the 1668–76 witch hunt.

== Background ==
The Finspång witch trial was long treated as a legend, but it now confirmed to have occurred. The witch trial does not seem to have occurred from public hysteria, but rather, it was ordered from above. Östergötland was during the 1610s ruled as an independent Duchy by the king's cousin John, Duke of Västergötland, and his consort, Princess Maria Elizabeth of Sweden. The royal couple, especially the Princess, is considered to have been directly responsible as the instigators of the witch trial, together with their private chaplain, Claudius Prytz.

Prytz had, as soon as he was installed, imparted the witch ideology to the couple by accusing a woman of having enchanted the Duke and Duchess. As a result, the woman was burned at the stake. The legend says, that when she stood at the stake, the woman had grabbed the clothes of the Vicar Prytz and tried to drag him into the flames, but the executioner had pulled him loose. The case seems to have imparted to the Duke and Duchess a strong belief in witches.

Until then, witch trials had been uncommon in Västergötland, as they had been in all Sweden. The laws made it hard to give a death sentence on the charges of sorcery and witch craft. The Duke, who was allowed to issue laws in the duchy, changed this and issued new laws about sorcery which made it much easier to punish alleged sorcery by death.

== Trial ==
The documents of the trial are not clear. In 1616, there is a mention that the executioner of Finspång was occupied with the task of "lowering witches in the water and torture them to a confession". The ordeal of water seems to have been frequently used as well as torture, which was not otherwise common in Sweden; torture devices were specially made to be used in this trial, which was conducted in a similar manner to witch trials in other countries where they were more common. A commission of priests was gathered to judge.

In 1617, the trial was finished and resulted in the execution of at least seven named women: Elin i Näs and Kerstin i Näs, Ingrid i Rippestorp, Margareta i Eketorp, Kirstin i Tråbrunna, Ingrid from Gållbo i Regna and Ingrid Orres from Vånga. Elin had been the first to be arrested. Lusse from Mullsäter died in prison before the execution. Lussi i Svartorp had been exposed to the ordeal of water and confessed to have been in Blockula and had sex with Satan with the women who had pointed her out, but her execution was delayed until 1620. At the same time, there is a mention of "two evil and reputed sorceresses, which their noble Graces Duke John and his noble consort Her Highness Maria Elizabeth condemned upon the order of God, burned on a village called Skoby vad."

The seven condemned of the Finspång witch trial were taken out to the woods, to a cliff above a great bonfire, and pushed to their death in the fire below. If this is true, the method of execution would have been quite unique in the Swedish witch trials, where the condemned were usually decapitated before they were burned; though there are cases where the method of execution is unclear, there is only one case, that of Malin Matsdotter in 1676, where the condemned witch is confirmed to have been burned alive.

== Aftermath ==
The witch trial of Finspång has been a legend in folklore. A part of the woods has been called the Blockula-hills. A tarn is called the Sorceress Tarn. A cave is reputed to have been the hiding place for accused women from the trial. Out in the wood, the legend says that one can hear female voices crying out: "I am innocent!", and the one who dared mocked them will fall dead before the sun set, as a farm hand once did.

The witch hunt of Östergötland in the 1610s can be seen as the first Swedish witch hysteria, but it was clearly ordered from above and not the result of a public belief. Next time a witch hysteria broke out in Sweden, in the great witch hunt of 1668–76, the 1610s witch hunts were taken as a bad example of those critical to the witch trials, such as the prime minister, Per Brahe: "To take to strong messures against those affected, as they believe in too much which is not real, will only increase the sorcery, as it happened in the reign of Duke John." And later: "The Prime Minister was reminded of the Princess of Duke John. She began to burn some, and in the end, they were not a single wife who was not accused." It is notable, that the witch hysteria of 1668–76 only reached the parts of the country which had no previous experience of witch trials, and never touched Götaland.
