= Maria of Sweden =

Maria of Sweden - English also Mary - may refer to:

- Maria Eleanor, Queen consort of Sweden 1620
- Maria of the Palatinate-Simmern, Swedish princess (consort) 1579
- Maria, Princess of Sweden 1588, daughter of King Carl IX (died in infancy)
- Maria Elizabeth, Princess of Sweden 1596
- Maria Euphrosyne, Princess of Sweden 1654
- Maria Pavlovna, Swedish princess (consort) 1908
