= John, Duke of Östergötland =

Prince John
- Duke of Östergötland
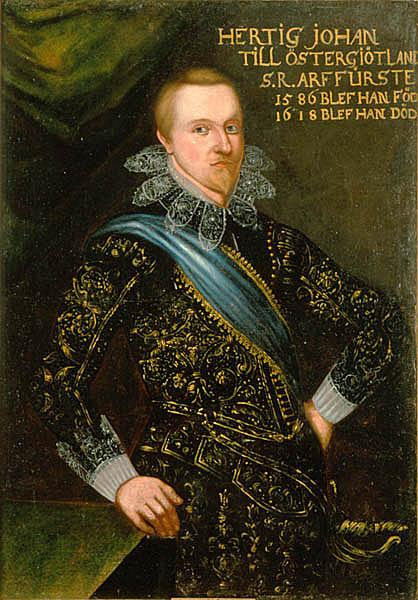
- Born: 18 April 1589; Uppsala Castle, Uppsala, Sweden
- Died: 5 March 1618 (aged 28); Bråborg Castle, Bråviken, Norrköping, Östergötland, Sweden
- Burial: Linköping Cathedral
- Spouse: Princess Maria Elizabeth of Sweden
- Issue: Hans Johansson (ill.)
- House: Vasa
- Father: John III of Sweden
- Mother: Gunilla Bielke

John of Sweden, Duke of Östergötland (Swedish: Johan; 18 April 1589 – 5 March 1618) was a Swedish royal dynast. He was titular Duke of Finland 1590–1606 and reigning Duke of Östergötland 1606–18.

His father was John III of Sweden and his mother was Gunilla Bielke. John's half-brother was King Sigismund III of Poland (1566–1632, reigned in Sweden in 1592–99, and in the Polish–Lithuanian Commonwealth in 1587–1632). His uncle was Charles IX of Sweden, who ruled from 1599 to 1611, and his first cousin was Gustav II Adolf of Sweden (1594–1632).

== Biography ==
=== Early life ===
At the age of one, the baby John was created Duke of Finland, Count of Åland, and Count of Bråborg. He was tutored together with his first cousin, the five-years-younger hereditary prince and future king, Gustav Adolf of Södermanland. John's uncle Duke Charles, then king, treated him like his own son.

After the Battle of Stångebro, Duke John's Catholic half-brother Sigismund was declared deposed from the Swedish throne in 1599 after a Swedish civil war. The 10-year-old John would have been the next king according to the line of succession. His uncle Charles, Duke of Södermanland (1550–1611), the closest adult in the line of succession, took up the regency, and, until 1604, no king was proclaimed.

=== Duke of Östergötland ===
In 1604, the Norrköping's succession pact was made and the then 15-year-old Duke John formally renounced his succession rights. Instead, he received promises of several duchies, including northern and western Östergötland, Kinda and Ydre districts in Småland, the county of Läckö, and the entire small province of Dalsland.

After John's renunciation, the next heir, the elderly regent Duke Charles, was proclaimed King Charles IX and was crowned. In 1605, when King Charles was warring in Livonia, Duke John was a member of the government that ruled on behalf of the absent king, together with Queen Christina and the kingdom's councillors.

In 1606 his duchies were exchanged from Finland to Östergötland. Then, in 1609, Läckö and Dalsland were exchanged for the much closer county of Stegeborg.

After King Charles' death in 1611, Duke John participated in the government. At the parliament of Nyköping the same year, Gustav II Adolf was recognized as the king, and Duke John renewed his renunciation. Several districts of Västergötland were added to his duchy.

On 29 November 1612, Duke John married his first cousin, Princess Maria Elizabeth of Sweden (10 March 1596 – 7 August 1618), daughter of Charles IX, at Tre Kronor Castle in Stockholm. Their marriage remained childless and they were also both very unhappy.

Duke John had a remarkable role in the development of the town of Norrköping. He draw guidelines for the new Saltängen area of the town and founded Holmens Bruk, where arms manufacturing started. He also commenced the building of Johannisborg Castle, but died during the construction period.

Duke John died in 1618 and left immense debts. He was a true wastrel, and the Johannisborg construction next to ruined the economy of his duchy.

He had one extramarital child, Hans Johansson, by his mistress, a Kerstin Månsdotter. The son died unmarried in Germany. Aside from John's childless widow, his elder half-brother King Sigismund of Poland and half-sister Anna of Finland survived him and were his closest relatives.

Duke John was buried in Linköping Cathedral.
