= Gunilla Bielke =

Queen of Sweden from 1585 to 1592

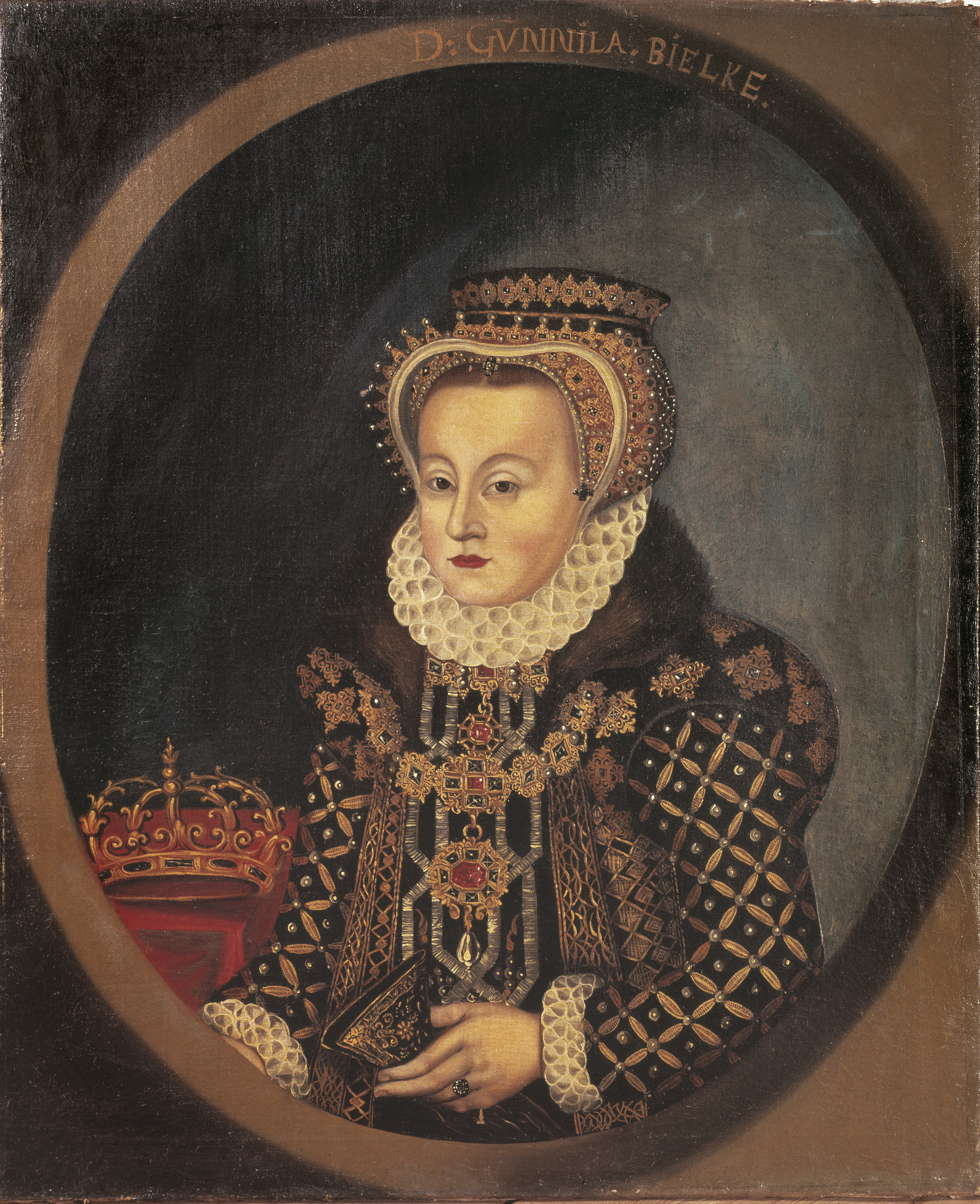

Queen consort of Sweden
- Tenure: 15 February 1585 – 17 November 1592
- Coronation: 22 February 1585
- Born: 25 June 1568
- Died: 19 July 1597 (aged 29)
- Spouse: John III of Sweden (m. 1585; died 1592)
- Issue: John, Duke of Östergötland
- Father: Johan Axelsson Bielke
- Mother: Margareta Axelsdotter Posse

Gunilla Bielke; Swedish: Gunilla Johansdotter Bielke af Åkerö (25 June 1568 – 19 July 1597) was Queen of Sweden as the second wife of King John III. Queen Gunilla is acknowledged to have acted as the political adviser to John III and to have influenced his religious policies in favour of Protestantism.

== Early life ==
Gunilla Bielke was the daughter of a cousin of John III, the former governor of Östergötland Johan Axelsson Bielke, and Margareta Axelsdotter Posse. Orphaned early, she was raised at the royal court since she was ten years old as a playmate of the King's daughter, Anna. In 1582, Gunilla was appointed as maid of honour to the Queen, Catherine Jagellon.

About half a year after the death of his first queen in 1583, John III chose Gunilla to be his next consort, after first having considered Sigrid Brahe. Bielke is described by her contemporaries as a beautiful blonde, though the portraits preserved by her are considered to be too stylistic to give a true image of her appearance. It was acknowledged that the reason to the marriage was that the king was attracted to her beauty, and this was also the reason John III himself stated for his reason to marry a member of his own nobility rather than a foreign princess. Asked why he did not marry a member of a princely house, John III openly stated that he wished to have a beautiful consort and that portraits of foreign princess were not to be trusted. Therefore, it would be wiser, "To marry a person in this country, of which whom you have already seen".

Similar to the mother and stepmother of John III, Margareta Leijonhufvud and Katarina Stenbock, Gunilla was already engaged when the King decided to marry her. She was engaged to the noble Per Jonsson Liljesparre, and initially refused the king's proposal on her own initiative. According to tradition, the King was so enraged by Gunilla's refusal that he slapped her in the face with his gloves. Her family, however, forced her to agree, retract her refusal, and consent to the marriage. Gunilla's engagement was broken, and her wedding to the king was arranged.

The marriage was controversial and regarded by the king's family, who opposed it, to be a misalliance. John III's sisters were enraged. They considered it a misalliance because of the difference in rank, despite the fact that their own mother was also a member of the nobility, a fact he pointed out to them without effect.

== Queen ==
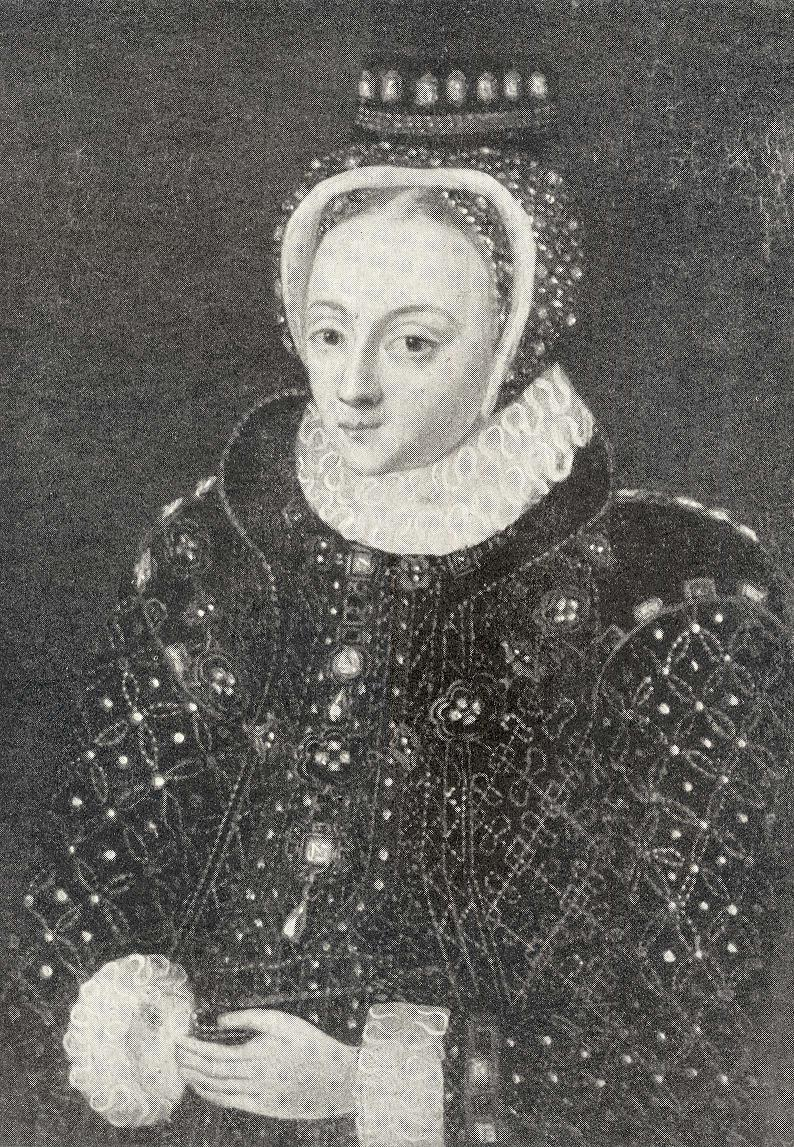
Queen Gunilla (about 1588)

The wedding ceremony took place in Västerås on 21 February 1585, followed by the coronation of Gunilla the following day. Because of the controversy around the marriage, John III was eager to make the occasion as impressive as possible, and arranged many celebrations of the event, such as a tournament, where Queen Gunilla officiated by handing out the prizes to the winners. The King's siblings, however, all refused to attend the wedding. The only exception was his sister Sophia, who was resident in Sweden and dependent upon his allowance for her income. For this, John III punished his sisters economically and entered into a long period of conflict with his brother Charles. Gunilla was given a very large allowance and is regarded as one of the richest of the queens of Sweden.

Queen Gunilla had significant influence on John III. She is credited with having influenced his policy regarding religion in favour of Protestantism, similar to the way his first spouse, Catherine Jagiellon, had influenced him in favour of Catholicism. After his marriage to Gunilla, John III's efforts to introduce the Counter Reformation in Sweden effectively ceased, and she is known to have acted in favour of persecuted anti-liturgical priests on several occasions.

Gunilla accompanied John III to the council in Reval in Swedish Estonia in 1589, where the monarch came into conflict with the councillors of the noble parliamentary estate. She acted as a mediator between the monarch and the deposed councillors during the conflict. Eventually, in 1590, the King released the political prisoners at Gunilla's request, among them her former guardian Hogenskild Bielke.

The King himself openly admitted to having changed his opinion and his decisions in various subjects "for the sake of our mistress the dear Queen's wishes". During the last years of the reign of John III, a large number of documents were issued in the name of the queen, reflecting her large influence upon state affairs. Gunilla successfully made recommendations for supplicants to John III; even the siblings of her spouse relented in their opposition to Gunilla and asked her to speak to the king on their behalf.

The political influence of Queen Gunilla was not without controversy. Rather, it has been regarded in a more negative light than the equally large influence of her predecessor; Gunilla was a member of the nobility, and she was accused of using her influence to benefit her relatives. Her brother-in-law Duke Charles, the future King Charles IX, portrayed her in a very bad light in this regard and accused her of using her influence over the king to promote her family with a rhyme in his chronicle:

Med drottning Gunnel vele vi tale
hon kan oss mycket hugsvale,
hos konungen kan hon fodra bäst.
ty hon är vår vän och släkten bäst

(Of Queen Gunilla we now shall say
that she can benefit us all so well,
with the king she will always be successful
because she is our friend but most of all she is her family's)

In 1590, John III left instructions for Queen Gunilla to serve as regent, should his son with her succeed to the throne while being still a minor. The son of Gunilla and John III, however, never succeeded to the throne.

When the son of Charles IX, King Gustav II Adolf of Sweden, wished to marry another member of the nobility, Ebba Brahe, in the 1610s, his mother Christina of Holstein-Gottorp opposed the match with a reference to the marriage between John III and Gunilla Bielke as a bad example, and eventually prevented it.

== Queen dowager ==
King John III died in 1592. According to the chronicle of Aegidius Girs, Queen Gunilla stayed by the bedside of the dying John III, holding his hand, while holding the hand of their son with the other. He was succeeded by his son in his first marriage, King Sigismund, the stepson of Gunilla, who was in Poland at the time of his father's death. Queen Dowager Gunilla refused to leave the Royal Castle in Stockholm before the arrival of Sigismund to Sweden, eager to have the support of Sigismund in protecting the large inheritance she had been given in the will of her late spouse against her former brother-in-law Duke Charles. Duke Charles, who had been received constant reports of the king's health during his illness, claimed that Gunilla had concealed the death of the late monarch for days while stealing from the Royal Castle's belongings.

Upon the arrival of Sigismund and his consort Anna of Austria to Sweden in 1593, Gunilla demanded that an inventory be made to clear her of Charles's accusations and presented the will of the late king to prove that her demands were legal. Duke Charles protested that the property left to her in the will of the late king was so preposterously large that the will should be declared illegal even if it was indeed the will of the late king. Queen Anna also accused Gunilla of having deprived the royal castle of most of its belongings, making it uncomfortable and bare, and the two queens also clashed for religious reasons.

On 18 May 1594, however, Sigismund confirmed the inheritance of Queen Dowager Gunilla. She retired to Bråborg Castle in the Duchy of her son, Östergötland, where she resided until her death. She was given an unusually generous allowance and lands in the will of her spouse, as well as sole and complete custody of her son, and thereby of his duchy.

In 1597, aged only 29, Queen Dowager Gunilla died of a fever and was interred in Uppsala Cathedral.

== Children ==
- John, Duke of Östergötland.

== Fiction ==
Gunilla Bielke is the main character in the 1983 novel Stackars lilla drottning - Historisk roman om Gunilla Bielke, Johan III:s unga gemål (Poor little queen - A historical novel about Gunilla Bielke, the young consort of John III) by Anna Sparre.

Gunilla Bielke Born: 25 June 1568 Died: 19 July 1597
Swedish royalty
Vacant Title last held by Catherine Jagellon	Queen consort of Sweden; 1585–1592	Succeeded by Anna of Austria
