= Lucretia Gyllenhielm =

Lucretia Johansdotter Gyllenhielm (1561–1585), was the illegitimate daughter of John III of Sweden and Karin Hansdotter. She was reportedly the favorite of her father.

== Biography ==
Lucretia Gyllenhielm and her siblings were ennobled and granted the surname Gyllenhielm in 1577, though she and her sister often used only their patronymic.

Lucretia was the favorite of her father. She was betrothed to the nobleman Karl Gustafsson Stenbock. When she died unmarried in 1585 at the age of 24, her father the king became distraught and issued an investigation if she had died as the result of witchcraft. Karl Gustafsson Stenbock accused the noblewoman Kerstin Gabrielsdotter Ulfsax, wife of Joen Nilsson (1536-1600). She was rumored to have murdered her late spouse and of having bewitched Lucretia. Ulfsax was arrested, and after having failed to collect twelve female nobles as character witnesses, she was executed.

== Other sources ==
- Ericson Wolke, Lars, Johan III: en biografi, Historiska media, Lund, 2004
- Larsson, Lars-Olof, Arvet efter Gustav Vasa: berättelsen om fyra kungar och ett rike, Prisma, Stockholm, 2005
- Gyllenhjelm, Lucretia i Wilhelmina Stålberg, Anteckningar om svenska qvinnor (1864)
- Karl IX:s rimkrönika (KB)
- Palmskiöldska samlingen i Uppsala
