= Bråborg Castle =

Swedish castle ruins

Coordinates: 58°36′58″N 16°20′28″E

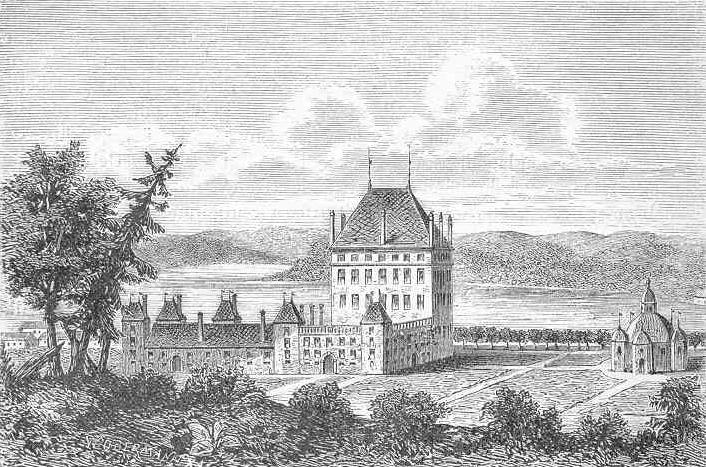
Bråborg with its cross shaped chapel to the right, illustrated after the Suecia Antiqua et Hodierna.

Bråborg was a former Royal castle at Bråviken, Norrköping Municipality in Östergötland, Sweden. Today, a ruin is all that remains of the estate.

== History ==
The house was built by Queen Dowager Gunilla Bielke in 1588-1590 and she lived there after her husband, King John III of Sweden, died in 1592. Gunilla Bielke herself died at Bråborg in 1597. Bråborg was later owned by her son, duke John of Östergötland. In 1612 he married his cousin, princess Maria Elisabeth of Sweden. They both died at Bråborg in 1618.

The building was partly destroyed in a fire in 1669, and in 1719 it was burnt down by a Russian army during the Russian Pillage of 1719-1721. The army also attacked the nearby town of Norrköping. The inhabitants needed stone to rebuild their town and used building material from the ruins of Bråborg. The new manor house at Bråborg was built about 1,000 metres (3,300 ft) from the burnt down house.

The old estate with remains of the renaissance castle covers an area of 240 by 190 metres (790 ft × 620 ft). The foundations and cellars are still visible today, together with the moats and parts of the gardens.

== See also ==
- List of castles in Sweden
