= Princess Maria Elizabeth of Sweden =

- Duchess of Östergötland
- Born: 10 March 1596; Örebro Castle, Örebro, Närke, Sweden
- Died: 7 August 1618 (aged 22); Bråborg Castle, Bråviken, Norrköping, Östergötland, Sweden
- Burial: Linköping Cathedral
- Spouse: Prince John, Duke of Östergötland (m. 1612; died 1618)
- House: Vasa
- Father: Charles IX of Sweden
- Mother: Christina of Holstein-Gottorp

Maria Elizabeth Vasa (10 March 1596 – 7 August 1618) was a Swedish princess, daughter of King Charles IX of Sweden and Christina of Holstein-Gottorp, and by marriage Duchess of Östergötland.

== Biography ==
Maria Elizabeth was born in Örebro Castle, and was brought up with her brother, Gustavus Adolphus, and her cousin, John, Duke of Finland. She was given a good education and tutored by Johannes Bureus and Johan Skytte. She was reportedly a good student, with an interest in literature, and corresponded with her teacher Johan Skytte in Latin at the age of ten.

=== Marriage ===
In 1610, Maria Elizabeth was engaged to marry her cousin, Prince John of Sweden, Duke of Östergötland. The reason for the marriage was political and arranged by the bride's mother, queen Christina. John was the son of former King John III of Sweden and had rights to the throne which exceeded those of Maria Elizabeth's father. Although he had given up these rights and was not an ambitious person, there were concerns that he might become a threat if he were to marry a foreign princess.

The wedding was met with opposition from the clergy, who complained both about the close relationship between the bride and the groom, which was not in accordance with the Swedish Church Ordinance 1571, as well as not having been consulted about it, but they were silenced by Queen Christina, who stated that the matter was a secular question.

On 29 November 1612, at the age of sixteen, Princess Maria Elizabeth celebrated her wedding to the Duke of Östergötland in the royal palace Tre Kronor in Stockholm.

The duke and duchess hosted a luxurious court in their residences at Vadstena Castle and Bråborg Castle in the Duchy of Östergötland. The marriage is described as unhappy, and Maria Elizabeth blamed her mother for having arranged it. Reportedly, none of the spouses was emotionally involved or happy about the marriage, and it was believed to have had a negative effect on both of their health.

Duke John suffered from increasing depression from 1613 onward, and from the summer of the following year, Maria Elizabeth was affected by periods of insanity "from which she recovered only periodically her remaining days onward." During her periods of insanity, she occasionally lost her ability to speak, and was kept under guard, as there were fears that she would attempt suicide. Queen Christina is said to have regretted having arranged the marriage. Her illness caused great concern, and her mother often visited her in the Duchy to attend her during her illness, and her brother King Gustavus Adolphus often sent his personal royal physician to attend her.

=== Witch hunt ===
The royal couple ruled quite independently in their Duchy. John had the right to issue new laws, and Maria Elizabeth evidently had influence on his rule. During the six years they lived together in Östergötland, a witch hunt was conducted in the duchy, for which they, and Maria Elizabeth in particular, are considered to be responsible.

A woman was executed in Söderköping, after being accused of having cast a spell on the royal couple. The personal priest of Maria Elizabeth, Claudius Prytz, was very active in this matter. The duke issued a new law which made it easier to judge and execute witches, which led to the Finspång witch trial;

"Two evil and reputed sorceresses, which Their Graces Duke Johan and his noble consort Maria Elizabeth upon the word of God destroyed, were burned at a place called Skogby vad".

Seven women were executed in Finspång in 1617. After this, there were few witch trials in Sweden. When the great witch frenzy of 1668–1676 broke out, the witch hunt of the 1610s in Östergötland was remembered and pointed out as a warning example by those skeptical towards the belief in witches. Lord High Steward Per Brahe warned:

"To be strict with those affected, as they believe in too much which is not real, and executions, will only increase this, as happened in the time of Duke John", and: "The Prime Minister was reminded of the Princess of duke John. She started to burn some, and in the end, there was not a wife who was not accused".

Ten such executions are confirmed. After the death of Maria Elizabeth, the witch hunt was put to an end.

=== Death ===
On 5 March 1618, she was widowed when Duke John died at Bråborg. Princess Maria Elizabeth was 22 years old and retired to Stegeborg Castle.

She died there, childless, of her lifelong disease, just five months after her husband; according to the royal chaplain Petrus Bjugg, death was a relief to her. She was buried next to her spouse at Linköping Cathedral in January 1619.

== Ancestry ==
Ancestors of Princess Maria Elizabeth of Sweden

Erik Johansson (Vasa)
Gustav I of Sweden (Vasa)
Cecilia Månsdotter (Eka)
Charles IX of Sweden (Vasa)
Erik Abrahamsson (Leijonhufvud)
Margaret Leijonhufvud
Ebba Eriksdotter (Vasa)
Maria Elizabeth of Sweden
Frederick I of Denmark
Adolf, Duke of Holstein-Gottorp
Sophie of Pomerania
Christina of Holstein-Gottorp
Philip I, Landgrave of Hesse
Christine of Hesse
Christine of Saxony

== Sources ==
- Hofberg, Herman; Heurlin, Frithiof; Millqvist, Viktor; Rubenson, Olof (1906). "Maria Elisabet, princessa". Svenskt biografiskt handlexikon (in Swedish). p. 128.
- Stålberg, Wilhelmina; Berg, P. G. (1864–1866). "Maria Elisabeth". Anteckningar om svenska qvinnor (in Swedish). p. 264.
