= Johan Baptista van Uther =

Dutch painter (died 1597)

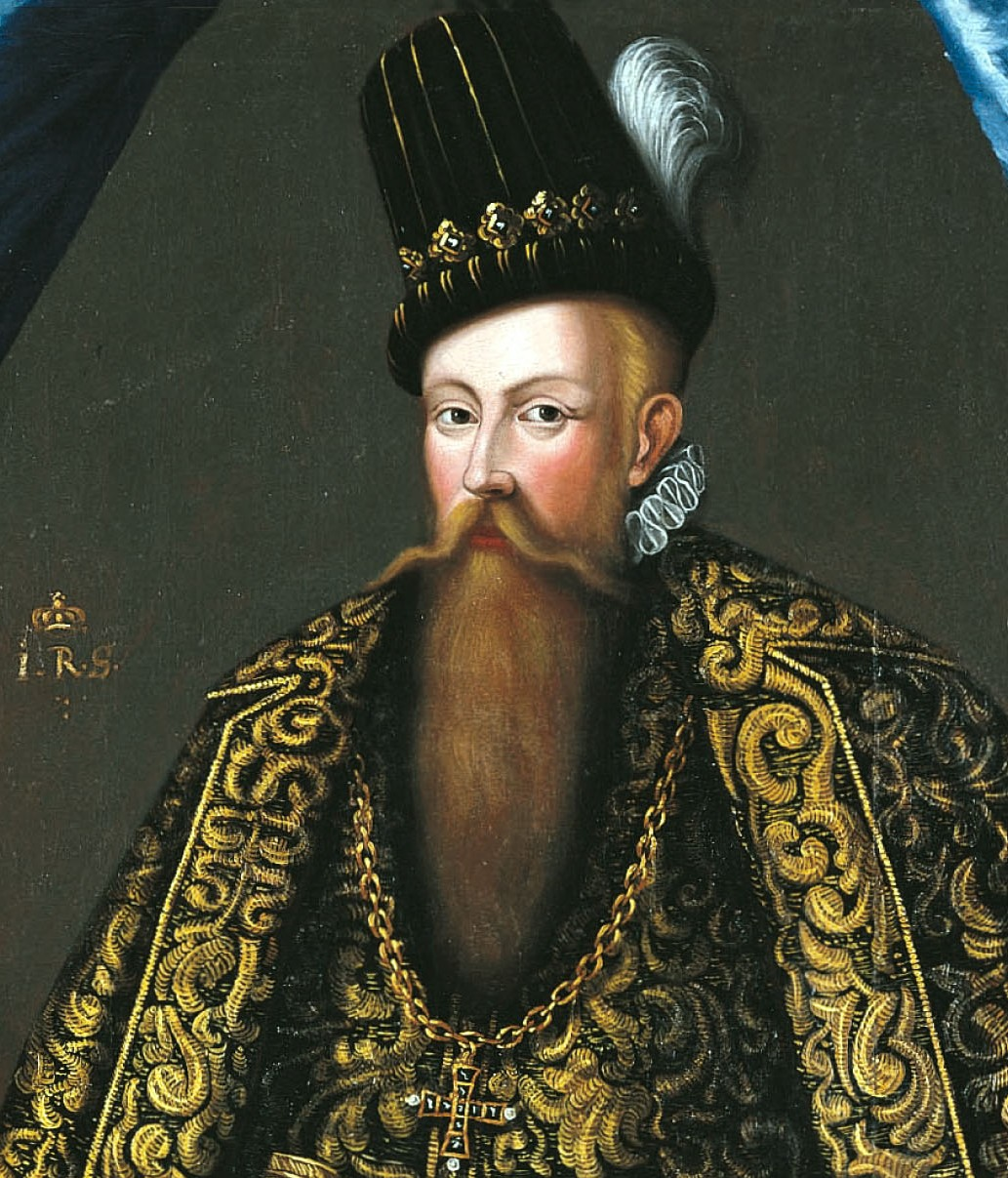
Portrait of king John III of Sweden, attributed to Johan Baptista van Uther

Johan Baptista or Hans van Uther (died 1597) was a Dutch Renaissance painter, active in Sweden.

== Life and works ==
No personal details are known about Johan Baptista van Uther, and no signed works by his hand survive. He is thought to have been born in either Antwerp or Utrecht. He was active in Sweden, from 1562 as court painter. Several portraits have been attributed to him, notably portraits of King John III of Sweden, dowager Queen Catherine Stenbock and the future King of Poland and Grand Duke of Lithuania, Sigismund III Vasa.

Stylistically, portraits attributed to Johan Baptista van Uther show influences from the refined court style of Antonis Mor. In turn, Johan Baptista van Uther taught and influenced court portraitist Holger Hansson and, possibly, Cornelius Arendtz.
