= Arendt de Roy =

Dutch architect

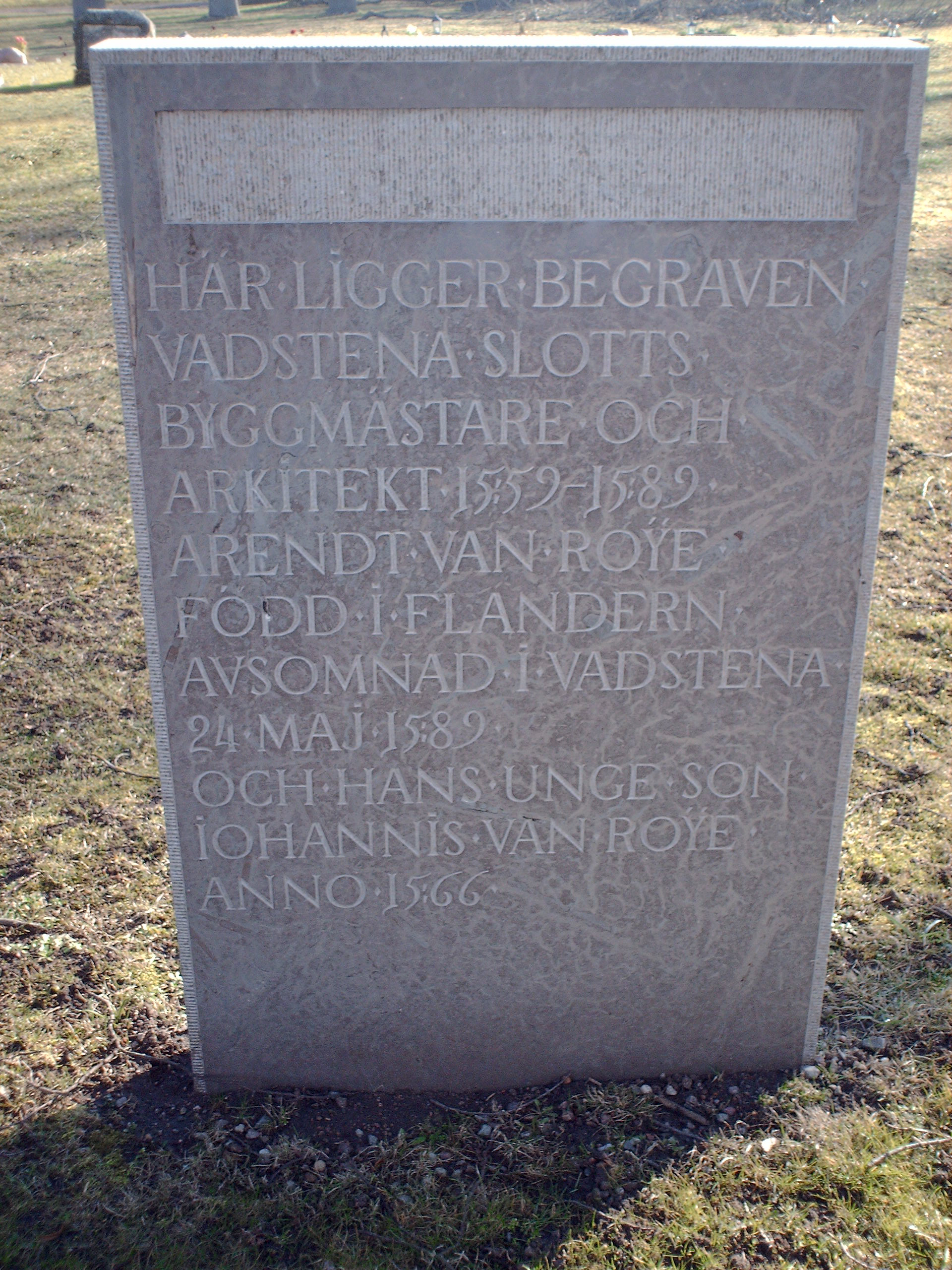
Grave stone in Vadstena.

Arendt de Roy or Arendt van Roy (died 24 May 1589) was a Flemish or Dutch architect. He was born in Flanders, and died in Vadstena, Sweden. He was the first architect at Vadstena Castle, beginning his work in 1566, and was succeeded by Hans Fleming. He is buried at the Vadstena Abbey.
