= Correspondence between John III and Ivan IV =

Correspondence between John III of Sweden and Tsar Ivan IV

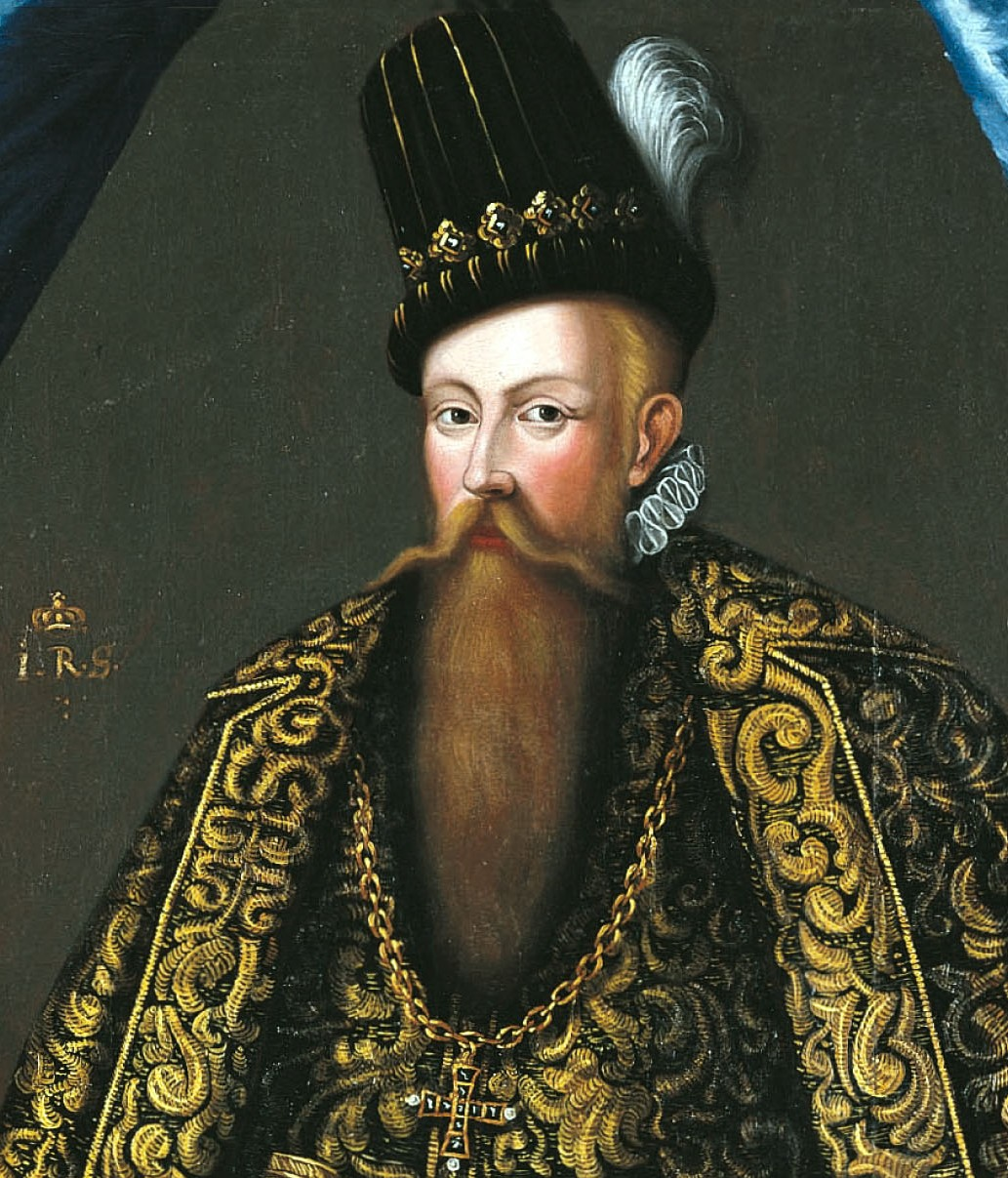
John III.

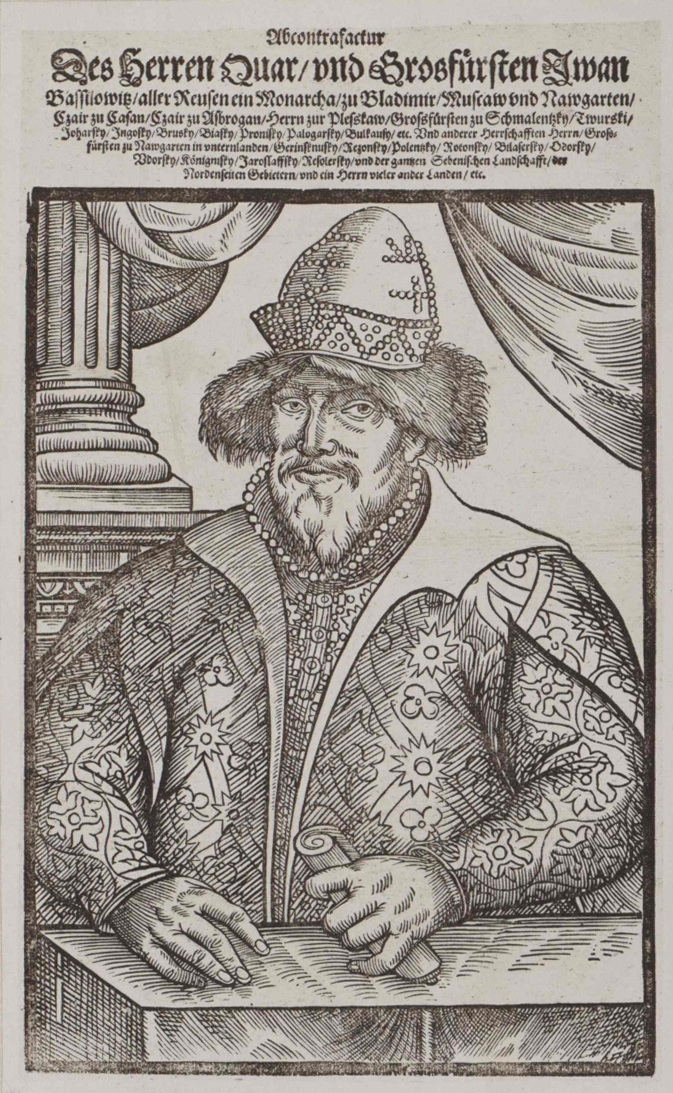
Ivan IV.

The correspondence between John III of Sweden and Ivan IV of Russia, exchanged in 1572 and 1573 have a unique character and reveal an irreconcilable hatred between the two monarchs. The letters are commonly known in Swedish as "Skällebreven" (roughly 'the scolding letters'). The exchange made peace settlements between their countries impossible to reach, prolonging the Russian Twenty-five years' War and worsening the atrocities committed during its duration; an example of which is the execution of Hans Boije af Gennäs.

== Background ==
One of Russia's attempts to expand to the west failed in 1560, when the Russian tsar Ivan IV's marriage proposal to the Polish princess Catherine Jagiellon was turned down. She was instead married to duke John of Sweden for strategic reasons. A new opportunity arose in 1566 when king Eric XIV, duke John's brother, needed Russian support in the Livonian War against Poland. The tsar, in exchange, wanted Catherine to be handed over him. An agreement was signed and the next year a Russian delegation of 200 men came to Stockholm to fetch the duchess. The delegation had the misfortune of arriving during duke John's rebellion against king Eric. The Russian delegates were physically abused and humiliated by the duke's troops. They were sent back with a letter from duke John where he blamed everything on his deposed brother and stated he was willing to come a peaceful resolution.

The tsar answered with a letter where he excused himself with the explanation that he had heard that John was dead and that Catherine had been held captive, and that he had wanted to deliver her from captivity. In addition he welcomed a delegation from Sweden to sign a peace treaty between the two countries. 57 men took part in the Swedish delegation, led by bishop Paul Juusten and Tönnes Olsson (Wildeman). In September 1569 they arrived to Novgorod, where they first had to wait for three months under humiliating conditions before they were allowed to meet the governor, who demanded negotiations to be made with himself, and not directly with the tsar. The members of the delegation were robbed, physically abused, and dragged around the streets of Novgorod. Later they were brought to Moscow as prisoners; there the insults and humiliations continued, until they were taken to the city of Murom where they were forced to stay over a year. The delegation finally met with Ivan, who handed over an unacceptable treaty proposal. Tönnes Olsson was allowed to return with the proposal to Stockholm, while the other members of the delegation had to make their way to Viborg (present day Vyborg), where they arrived on 1 February 1572.

== The letters ==
While the Swedish delegation was imprisoned, the two rulers exchanged letters. The tsar let John know that the reason that, as he expressed it, "our wrath at your country has been lit" was due in part that John hadn't made an effort to save the Russian delegates from their humiliating treatment, in part that when the Swedish delegates had met with Ivan's boyars, they had comported themselves inappropriately. The tsar no longer wanted to participate in negotiations with John. Instead, should the Swedish king wish to avoid an unfriendly visit "on the Swedish islands" he would have to satisfy himself with negotiations with the governor in Novgorod. But John demanded to conclude his treatises directly with the tsar, and to be held by the tsar with the same regard as "the [Holy] Roman emperor and all the Christian kings", for John was "a ruling Christian king" over a great kingdom and "not obliged to be submissive to any other lord in any way".

In a reply from 1571 Ivan starts by "wondering and smiling over how he exalts himself, and is so haughty, forgetting his father was from a village in Småland" and claimed that John should have been grateful to have been allowed to negotiate with the tsar's governor, since the former was hardly of the same dignity as the tsar. He further claimed that Sweden once had been ruled by Novgorod, and that he was tired of the Swedish provocations in Livonia. He finished by informing John that he would possibly consider resuming negotiations if queen Catherine and her sons were sent to him.

A later letter from Ivan, dated January 1573 (by which time the war had already broken out) is only known through John's reply, in which he insults Ivan by letting him know how he "sensed the unreasonable, peasant arrogance, lies, and contempt you use against us", and expressed his wonder that Ivan was the son of a great prince, since he appeared to have been raised by peasants. He then defends his father against Ivan's accusations, and continues with further insults. A surviving draft is formulated even more strongly, but it is uncertain whether even the final letter ever reached the tsar.

While this exchange of letters went on, Ivan had also reached out to former king Eric, who was imprisoned in Turku Castle. The deposed king had sent the tsar an appeal for help, "even with a small military force". Ivan replied that he remembered the Eric's earlier helpfulness and declared himself to "pardon" him with "great favour and grace". "And", he writes, "because of your brother John's ingratitude and the way he disgraced our delegates, We will, if God wills it, come with Our greatest force against your brother John and Our sword all over the country of Sweden and would show you due favor and mercy, and stand by you. This you must know secretly, and think how this best could take place, and you keep it secret, so that it not becomes obvious to the Swedes!"

The tsar sent insulting letters to other rulers as well. For instance, queen Elisabeth was told that she was a powerless old housewife.
