= Karin Hansdotter =

Mistress of Duke of Sweden

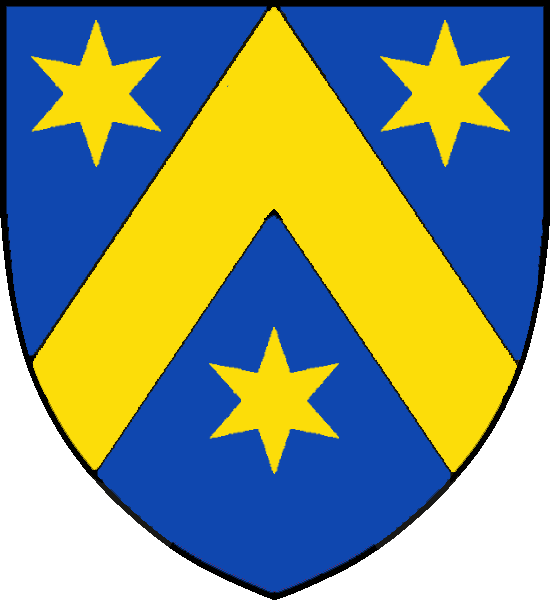
Katarina Hansdotters coat of arms

Karin Hansdotter (1539–1596) was the royal mistress of King John III of Sweden during his time as Prince and Duke of Finland in 1555–1562.

== Biography ==
Karin Hansdotter was the daughter of the Lutheran priest Hans Klasson Kökkemäster, a former monk of the Dominican Order, and his wife Ingeborg Åkesdotter, a former nun and the illegitimate daughter of count Åke Hansson Tott. Her father left monastic life after the Swedish Reformation and became a Lutheran priest in Stockholm, but lost his office because of adultery.

=== Royal mistress ===
Karin Hansdotter was given a position in the household of the queen dowager Catherine Stenbock, where she met Prince John. In 1555, Prince John was given his own household, and Karin left her position with the queen dowager and became the official kept mistress of John with the approval of her guardian. In 1556, accompanied John when he left Sweden for Åbo (Turku) Castle in his Duchy of Finland, where she lived with him as his hostess and the center of his court. She was referred to as "Our Gracious Lady" and given her own household with her own maids and also brought her relatives and friends to her household. She followed him as far as to Arboga on his journey to England in 1559, and lived with him in Stockholm in 1560-61. The couple had four children.

In 1562, the relationship between Karin and John was terminated awaiting his marriage to Catherine Jagellonica of Poland. In October 1562, Karin was awarded several estates in Finland, notably Vääksy Manor in Kangasala, and married to the nobleman Klas Andersson Westgöte (died 1565), a trusted courtier of John. She was granted a great dowry by John and retired to the manor of her new spouse, Vik in Birkala. It is noted that she left her eldest children with John, but the two youngest followed her to Vik, as well as her own mother, who apparently lived with her.

=== Later life ===
In 1563, Duke John rebelled against his half brother, King Erik XIV and her spouse joined him. The defeat of John's rebellion resulted in John and his family (including her two eldest children with him) being imprisoned and the execution of her spouse for treason for his part in the rebellion. Karin, widowed and abandoned, was left destitute after her home was ransacked, however, Eric XIV did restore her property to her the following year.

When John succeeded to the throne as king after the deposition of his brother in 1568, he granted her several additional estates, making her quite wealthy. In 1572, Karin married the royal official Lars Henrikson Hordeel (d. 1591). Her new husband was ennobled by John III in 1576, on condition that he "henceforth faithfully and diligently act toward Our Dear Lady and both of Our offspring". Her husband was consequently given an office and her son named governor of Åbo Castle, and her children with John III where ennobled in 1577 and her daughter Sofia became a lady-in-waiting of Princess Elizabeth of Sweden. From 1580, due to the office of her spouse and son, Karin was able to move back into Åbo Castle and once again become its hostess and the lady of her own court there. She had custody of her grandchildren by her daughter Sofia after Sofia's death in 1585 until they were taken to Sweden in 1589.

When was widowed in 1591, Karin retired to her estate, where she was the neighbor of the deposed queen Karin Månsdotter, who lived in the estate next to hers. Karin died in 1596 during the great Finnish peasant rebellion, and died shortly before the rebels reached and sacked her estate.

== Children and family ==
Karin and John had four children:

- Sofia Johansdotter Gyllenhielm (1556–1583) - who married Pontus De la Gardie (d. 1585),
- August Johansson Gyllenhielm (1557–1560),
- Julius Johansson Gyllenhielm (1559–1583),
- Lucrecia Johansdotter Gyllenhielm (1560–1585).

Karin and her first husband Klas had one child:

- Brita Klasdotter Westgöte (c.1563–1620) - who married Carl Stenbock (d. 1609).

Karin and her second husband Lars had one child:

- Anna Larsdotter Hordeel (1573–1646) - who married Hans Mårtensson Boije (d. 1617).
