= Hans Fleming =

Flemish architect

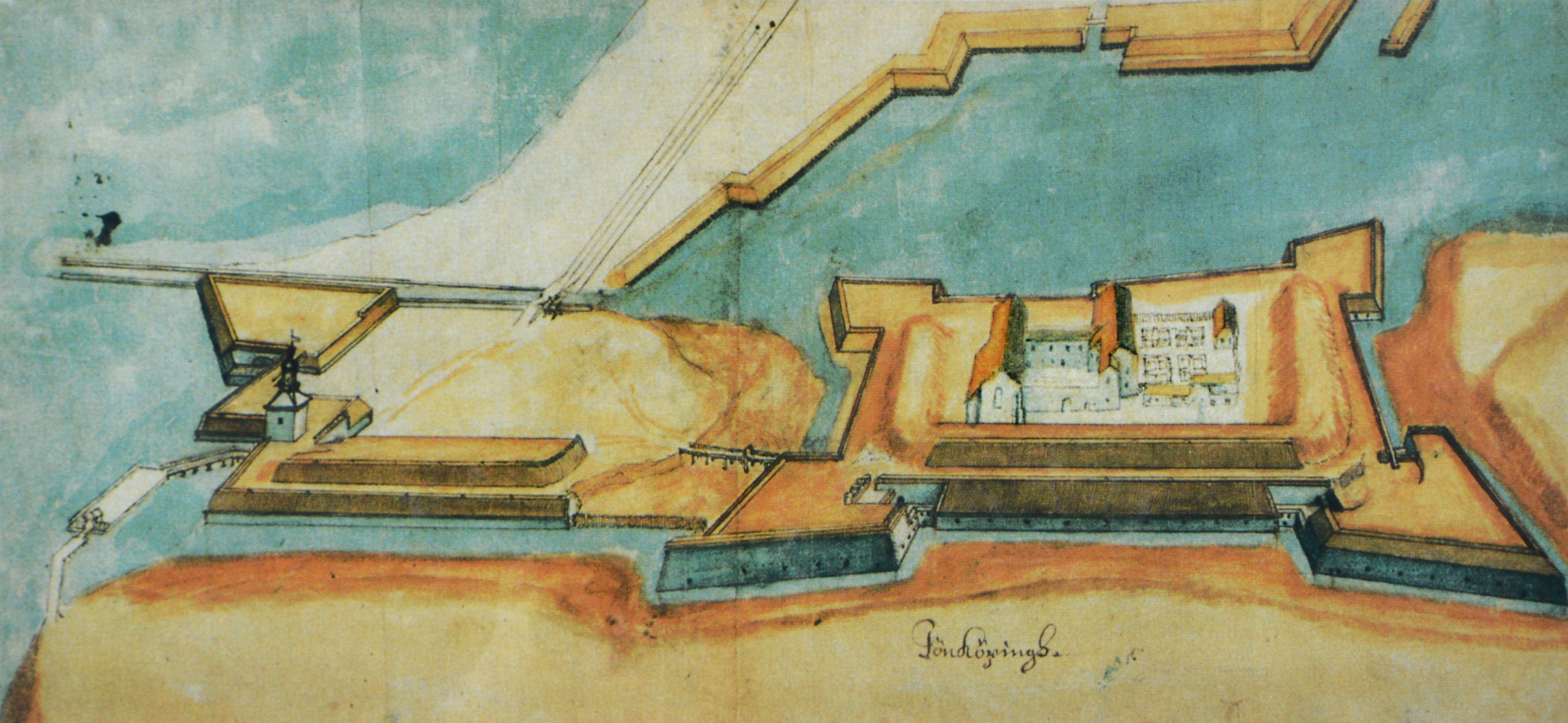
Perspective drawing of Jönköping Castle from 1617, made by Hans Fleming

Hans Fleming (born around 1545 in Namur, died in 1623) was a Flemish fortress builder, architect and sculptor active in Sweden.

He was born in Namur, Habsburg Netherlands, present-day Belgium. Hans Fleming, who was active in Lübeck in the 1560s, was summoned to Sweden by Johan III and became the architect at Vadstena Castle on 11 August 1590, and in 1603 also started his work at Jönköping's castle. In 1605 he was also working at Älvsborg, Gullberg, Nylöse and the newly built Karl IX's Göteborg. As early as 1603, however, Fleming had been called in to decide what should be built on Älvsborg and Gullberg, and at the beginning of the following year he had mapped out the new town on Hisingen, for which he had completed a drawing, as well as for its fortification.

In 1613 he received a new order as an architect in Jönköping and made a drawing for a new city there and for city fortifications, and after the former was approved by the king, Fleming demarcated the city and allocated its plots and then supervise the buildings; Fleming's fortification drawing was approved with some modifications, after which the fortification work began. He also prepared drawings for Jönköping Castle and its fort, as well as a new drawing for the city in 1620, which was later approved; he also had to do with the newly started construction in Gothenburg. Fleming had been Duke Johan's assistant with Johannisborg's construction in 1613 and in 1617 he received orders also for Kalmar Castle and Borgholm Castle as well as the right to quarry on Öland and to ship from there also to foreign places. He later delivered stone carving work for stairs and portals, including Vaxholm Fortress and Tre Kronor in Stockholm.

Fleming died in 1623.
