= Johannisborg =

- Norrköping Municipality, Sweden
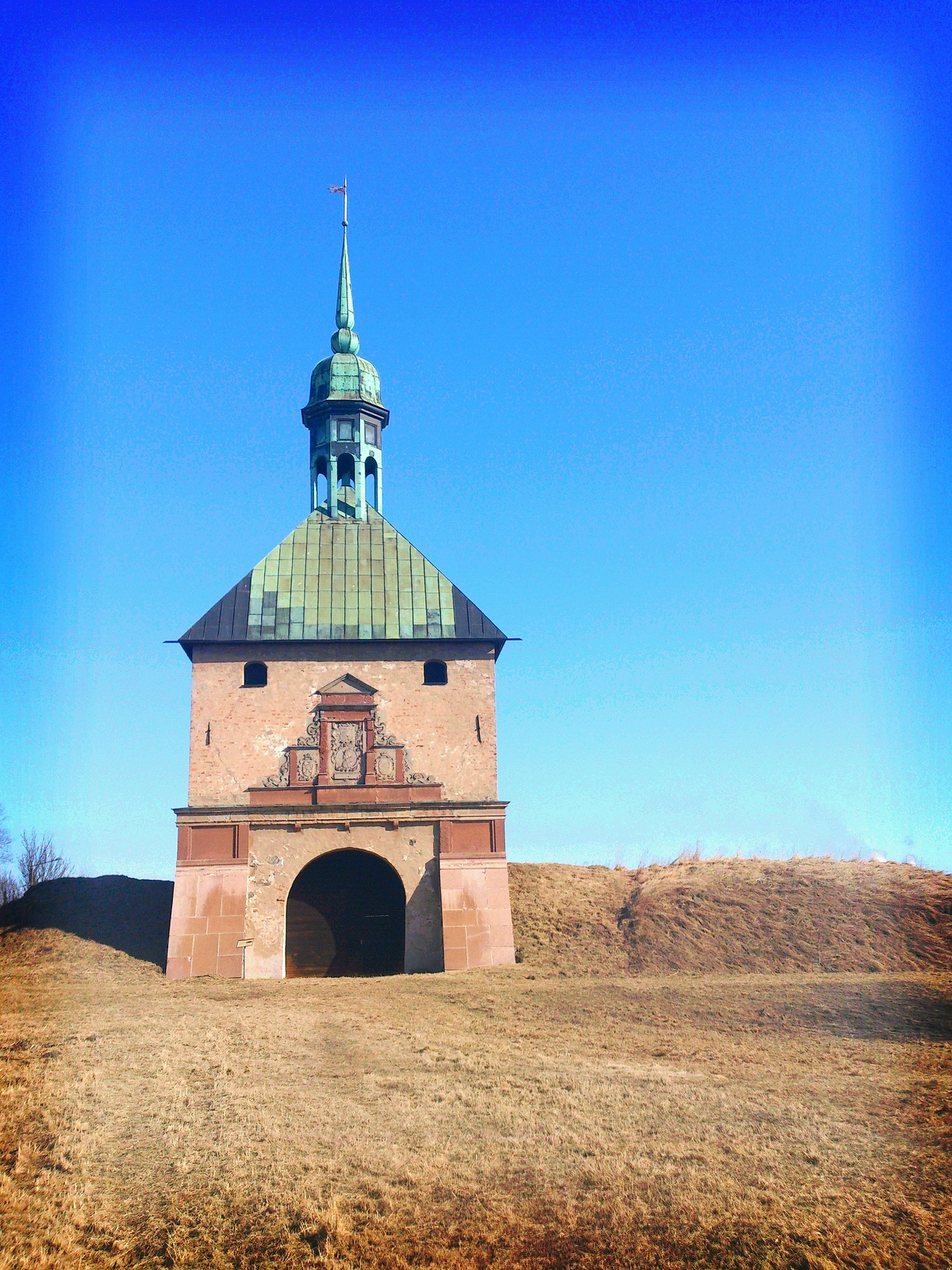
- Johannisborg gate tower

Location
- Coordinates: 58°36′03″N 16°11′53″E

Johannisborg is the ruin of a fortification located in Norrköping Municipality, Östergötland County, Sweden. The foundations for Johannisborg dates to 1614. The fortifications were largely finished in 1618. The architect of the project was Flemish architect Hans Fleming (1545- 1623). When Russians invaded in 1719, Johannisborg was burned down.

== See also ==
- List of castles in Sweden
