= Saltängen =

Urban district in Norrköping, Sweden

Coordinates: 58°35′45.73″N 16°11′45.27″E

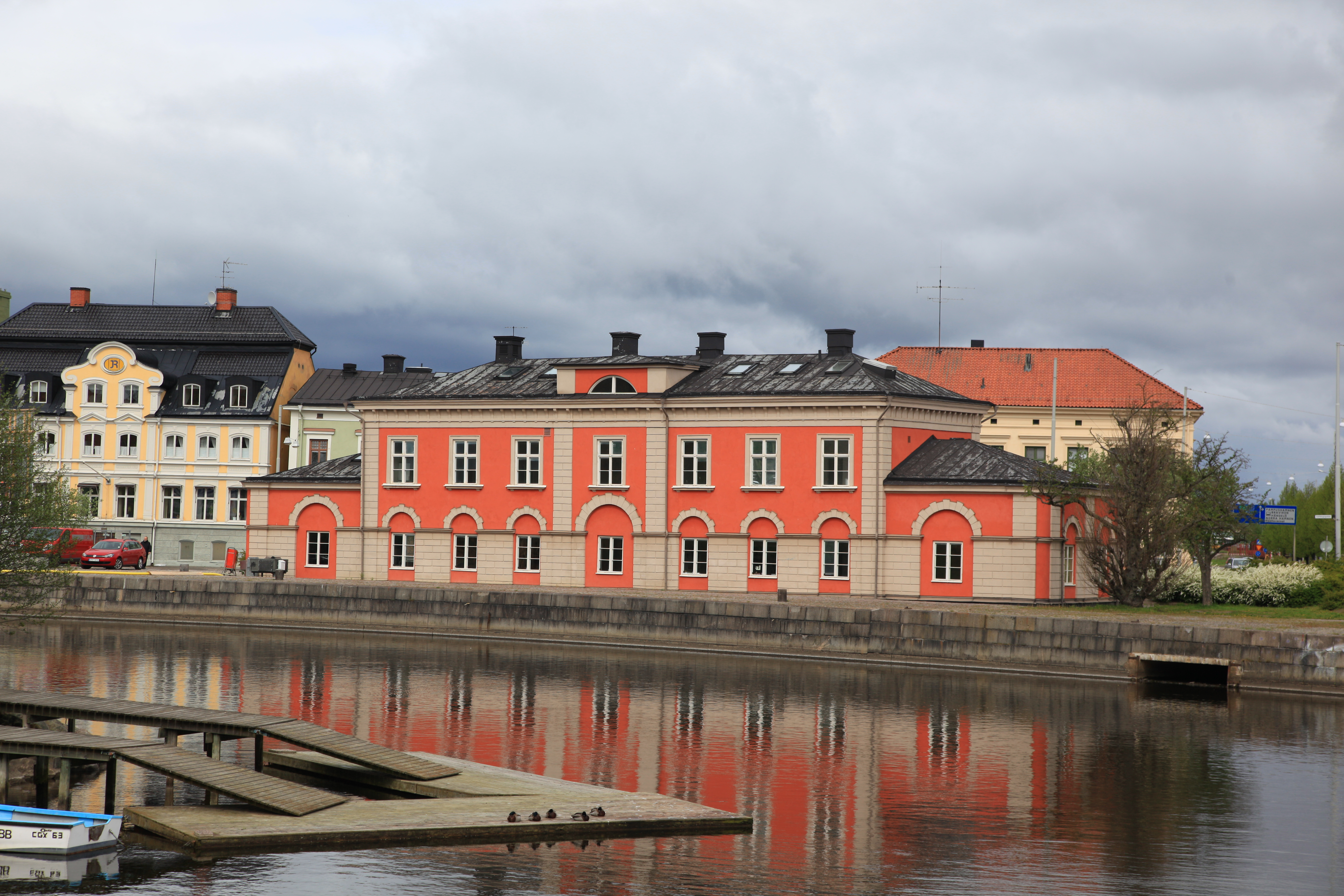
Old Customs House in Saltängen, Norrköping

Saltängen is a part of Norrköping, Sweden.

The Swedish Maritime Administration and the Swedish Prison and Probation Service are located in Saltängen.

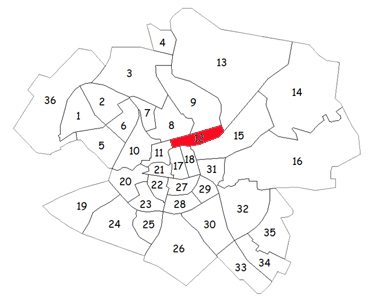
