= Vadstena Castle =

Coordinates: 58°26′45″N 14°53′01″E

- Vadstena slott
- Vadstena Castle: A 16th-century moated Swedish fortress.

General information
- Architectural style: Renaissance
- Location: Vadstena, Sweden
- Construction started: 1545
- Completed: 1620

Design and construction
- Architects: Arendt de Roy, Hans Fleming

Vadstena Castle is located on the shores of Lake Vättern.

Vadstena Castle (Swedish: Vadstena slott) is a former royal castle in Vadstena, Östergötland, Sweden.

== History ==
Vadstena Castle was originally built by King Gustav I in 1545 as a fortress to protect Stockholm from enemies approaching from the south. The fortress consisted of three smaller stone buildings facing Lake Vättern, three 31-meter wide ramparts, a courtyard, a moat and four circular cannon turrets. The original ramparts were torn down in the 19th century and the present ramparts were inaugurated in 1999. The stone buildings later formed the ground floor of the castle.

On August 22, 1552, King Gustav I married his third wife, Catherine Stenbock, in Vadstena. One of the castle banqueting halls is called the Wedding Hall (Bröllopssalen), although its construction wasn't finished in time for the wedding.

The reconstruction from fortress into a habitable castle began in the 1550s, when Prince Magnus became duke of Östergötland. Duke Magnus suffered from mental illness and was the only son of Gustav I who didn't eventually become king of Sweden. Magnus died in 1595 and is buried in the church of nearby Vadstena Abbey.

By 1620, when the castle was completed, all the kings of the House of Vasa had contributed to its construction. Since 1620, the castle has been very well preserved, and is one of Sweden's best examples of Renaissance architecture.

Vadstena Castle was a royal palace until 1716, when the royal family lost interest in it; after which it became a storage barn for grain.

== Today ==
Since 1899, the castle has housed the Provincial Archives and today visitors can also find a Castle Museum with 16th and 17th century furniture, portraits and paintings. The castle is also the seat of the International Vadstena Academy, Sweden's smallest opera house, commissioning new operas and reviving lost operas from archival scores. During summers the courtyard plays host to many concerts; both classical and pop music.

== Interior ==
The eastern half of the castle belongs to the National Archives and has had minor interior renovations during the 20th century for office space. In the western part, the halls are on display to the public. On the first floor of the castle is the so-called Herreköket, where food was prepared, and the Borgstugan, which belonged to the castle's soldiers. On the second floor are the Drabantsalen and the so-called Bröllopssalen. It has been called so because it was previously assumed that this was where Gustav Vasa and Katarina Stenbock held their wedding party in 1552, but later research has shown that the castle was not built to the second floor at that time. The Vadstena Academy arranges opera in the Bröllopssalen every summer. On the second floor is also the so-called Godegårdsrummet, a name it received when a painted wooden ceiling from Godegård's mill was placed in the room in recent times. The third floor houses the Stora and Lilla Rikssalen, several smaller halls and a castle chapel for the royals and the court. The western part of the third floor is today furnished through the Vadstena Castle Foundation and with deposits from the National Museum.

Of the four cannon towers, the postern, the northwestern one is on display to the public. The southwestern one can be viewed during guided tours or when art exhibitions are held there. The northeastern one has been rebuilt and modernized for the premises of the National Archives, while the southeastern one, which is the best preserved, is not on display to the public.

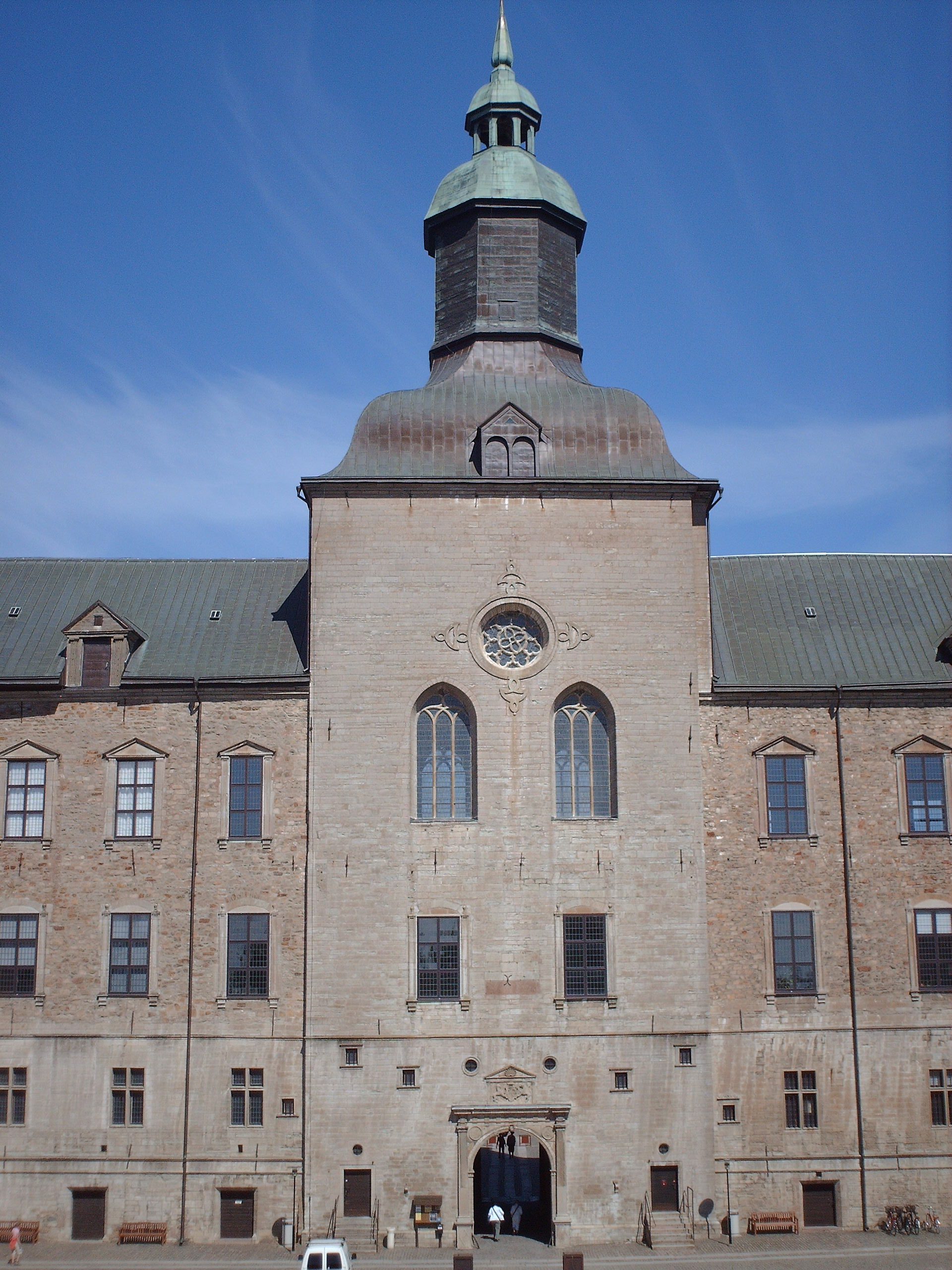
The chapel is situated in the main tower.

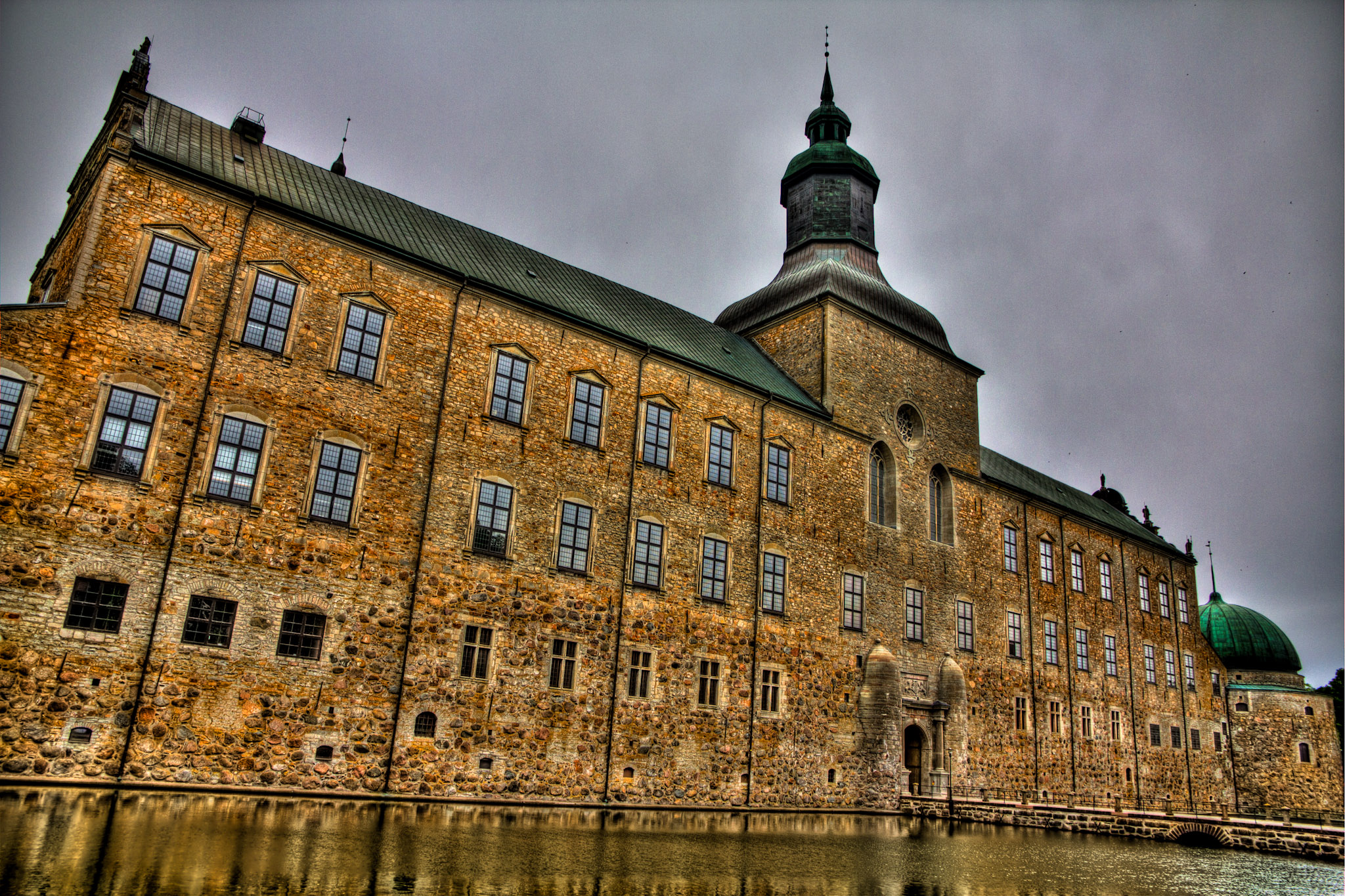
View from north-east.

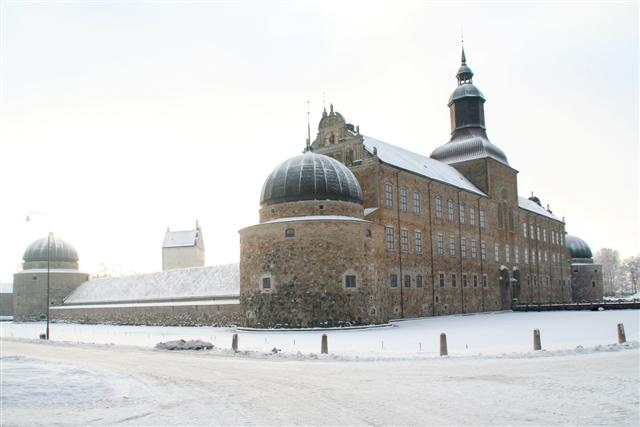
Winter view from north-east.

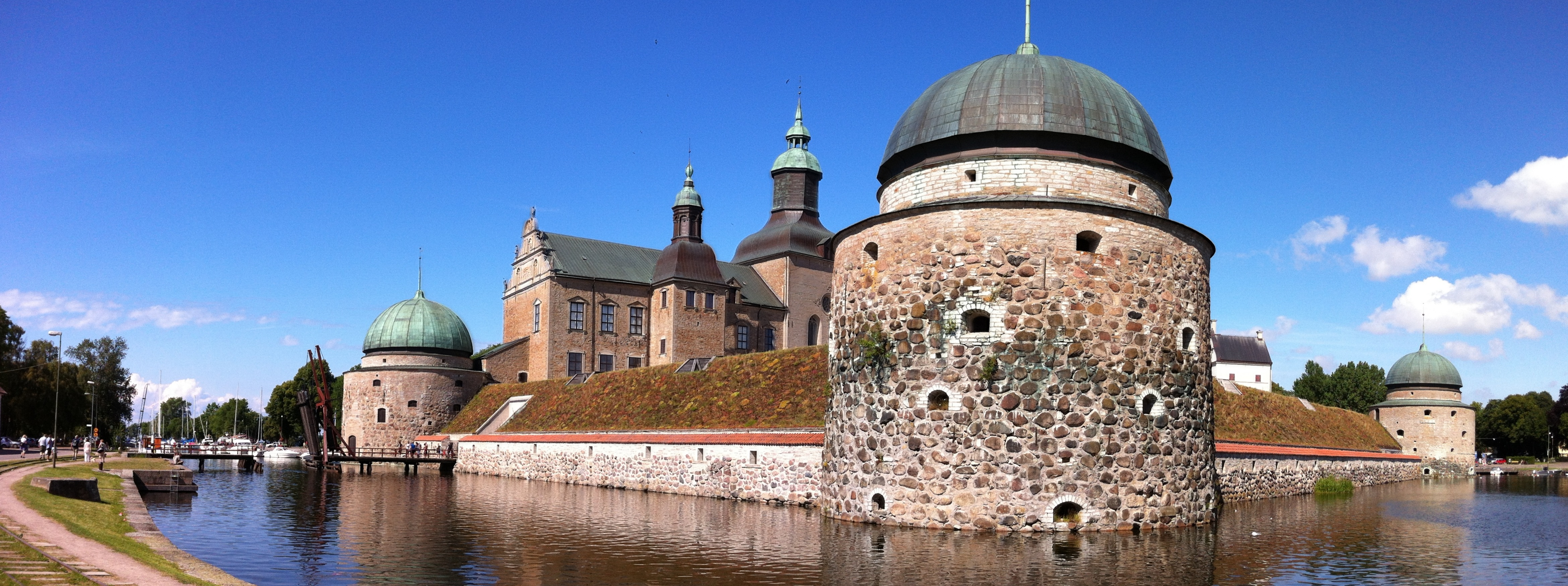
Summer view from south-west.

The ramparts and moat of the castle.

Circular turrets by the moat.

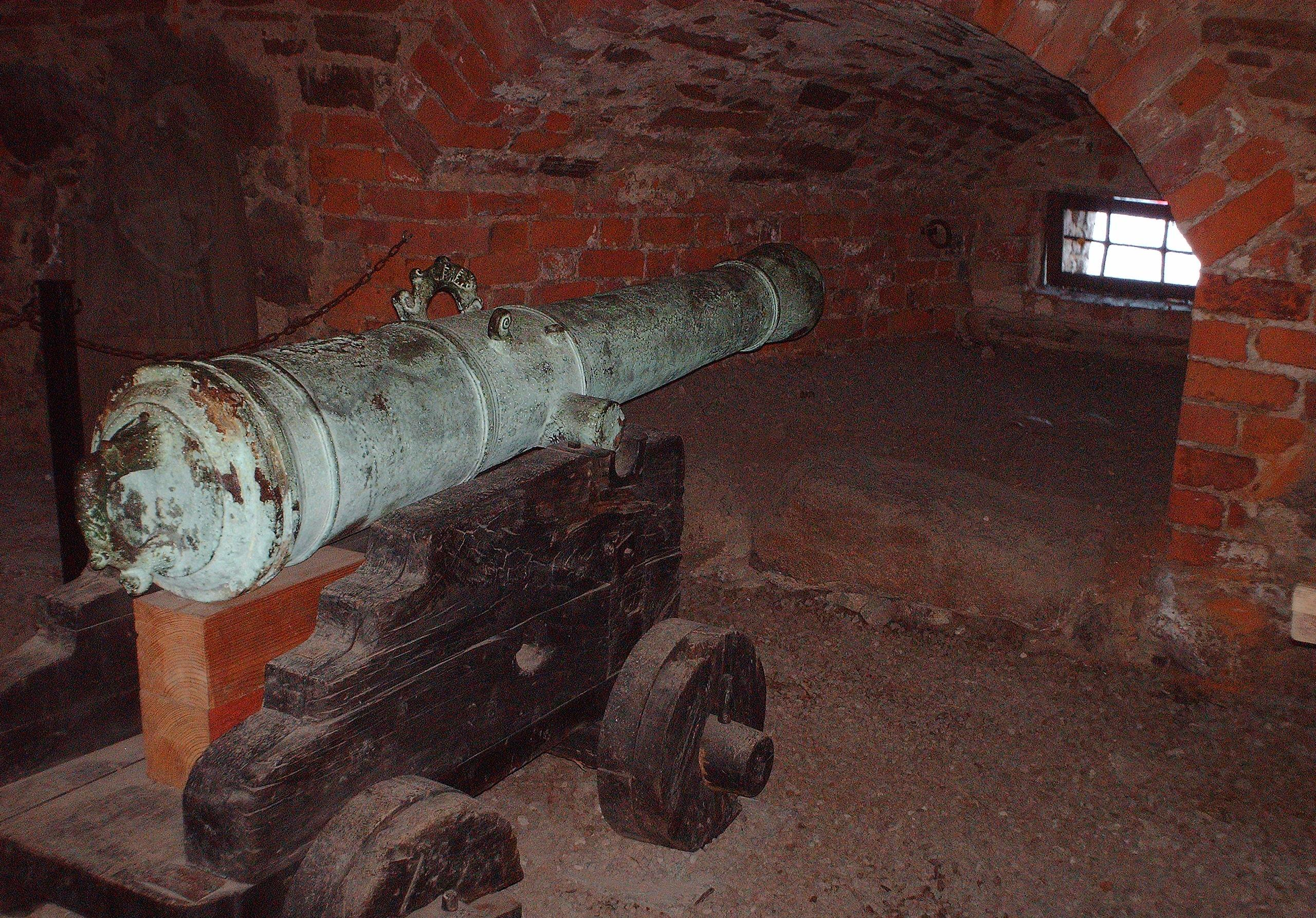
The basement with a 17th-century cannon.

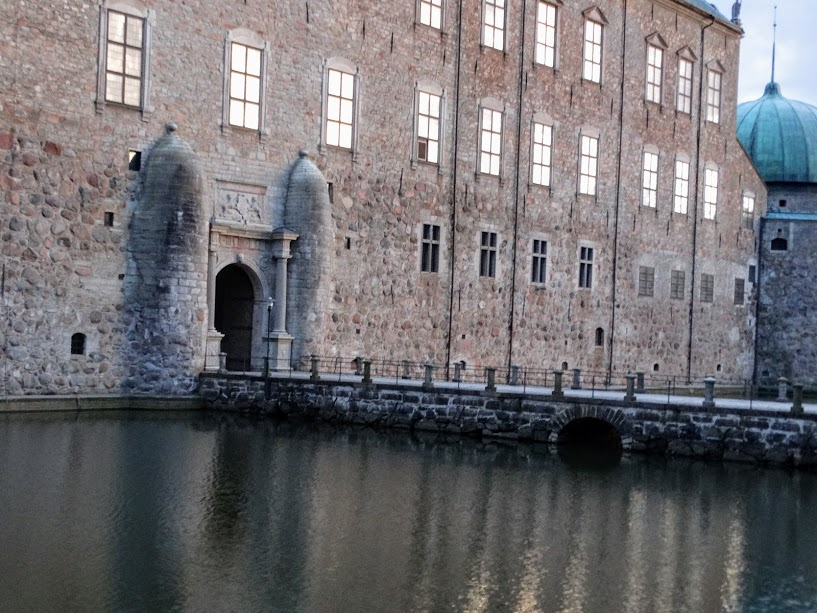
Main gate

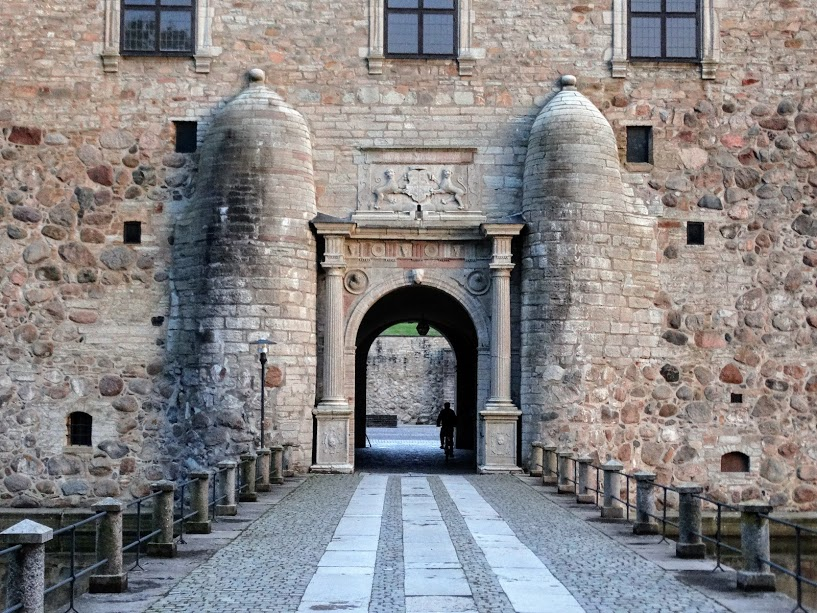
Bridge leading to the main gate

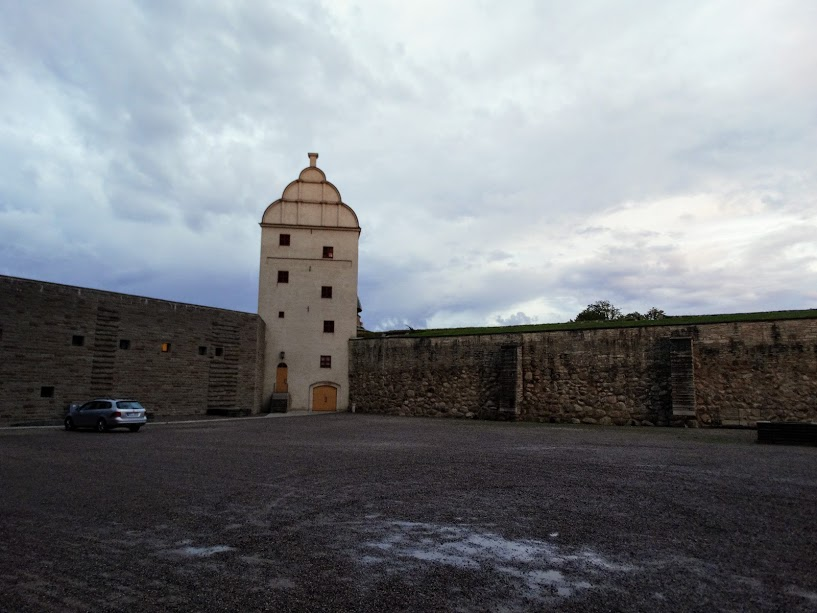
Tower

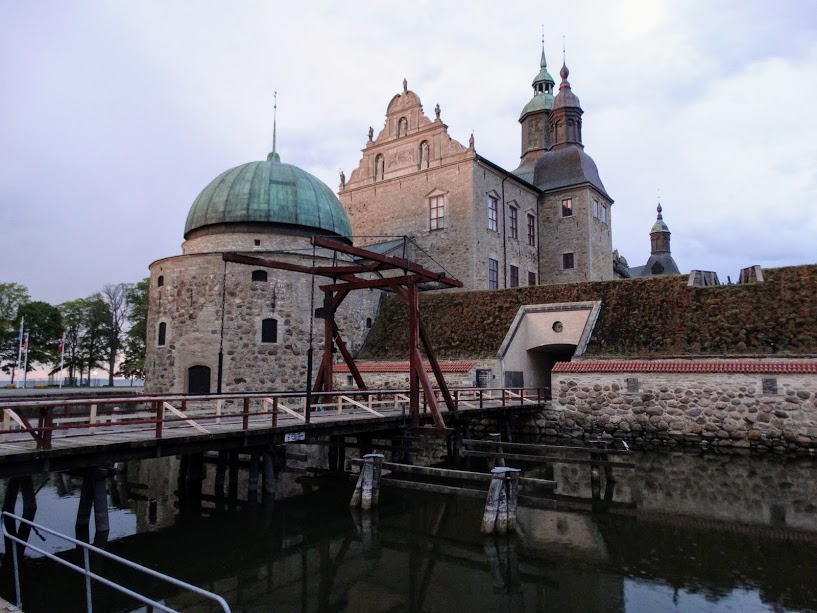
Suspension bridge

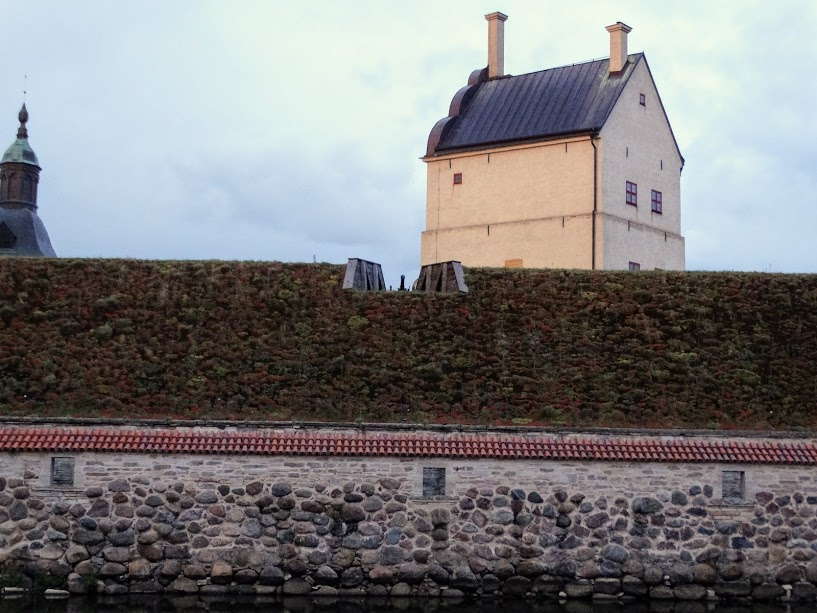
Gun on the fortress wall
