= Carl of Nericia =

Carl of Nericia; Swedish Hertig Karl av Närke - may refer to:

- Carl IX, King of Sweden 1604–1611, also Duke of Sudermania
- Carl Philip, Prince of Sweden 1601, also Duke of Sudermania
