= Philip of Sweden (disambiguation) =

Philip of Sweden may refer to:

- Philip of Sweden, King of Sweden 1105
- Philip, prince (died after 1200), son of King Eric IX of Sweden
- Philip, prince (died 1251), son of King Canute II of Sweden

== See also ==
- Carl Philip of Sweden (disambiguation)
