= Elizabeth Ribbing =

Elizabeth Ribbing (Swedish: Elisabet; 1 January 1596 at Fästered, Finnekumla – 24 April 1662), was a Swedish noblewoman and lady-in-waiting. She was the secret morganatic spouse of Prince Charles Philip, Duke of Södermanland.

== Biography ==
Ribbing was the daughter of the nobles Seved Svensson Ribbing and Anna Gyllenstierna. She was a lady-in-waiting to Queen Dowager Christina of Holstein-Gottorp. On 5 March 1620, she married Prince Charles. The wedding was kept secret because the Queen Dowager had forbidden the match, and was witnessed by Ribbing's sister Christina Ribbing. The wedding contract was signed: "Your faithfull husband, as long as I live, Carolus Philippus", and: "Your Royal Highness humble servant as long as I live, Elizabeth Ribbing".

Because the marriage was kept secret, Ribbing was forced to defy her brother's wish that she marry her relative, Knut Liliehöök (1603–1664). In 1622, she became a widow. She was pregnant at the death of her spouse, and was harassed by her family because of it until her sister, her wedding witness, revealed the marriage. She was later married to Knut Liliehöök, governor of Turku. Her daughter, Elisabet Carlsdotter Gyllenhielm (1622–1682), was taken into the household of the Queen Dowager: she was married to the nobles Axel Turesson Natt och Dag (1645) and Baltasar Marskalk and lady-in-waiting to Queens Maria Eleonora of Brandenburg and Hedwig Eleonora of Holstein-Gottorp.
