= Karin Nilsdotter =

Swedish royal mistress

Karin Nilsdotter (c. 1551–1613), was the royal mistress of Charles IX of Sweden, between 1568 and 1578. She was the mother of Carl Carlsson Gyllenhielm.

Karin Nilsdotter was the daughter of Nicolaus Andrae (Nils Andersson), vicar of Östra Husby in Östergötland, and his spouse Karin. She is believed to have become the mistress of Charles in 1568. In 1573, she is confirmed as such, and she was by then officially the chamber lady of the noblewoman Sigrid Kyle, spouse of Johan Olofsson till Sjösa, governor of Nyköping Castle, at Sjösa Manor. After the birth of their son in 1574, she lived with her son at Julita Manor. The relationship was terminated before Charles' marriage in 1578, when she was awarded the Sundby Manor and married to Charles' courtier Gustav Andersson (d. 1584), with whom she had two daughters. She remarried the personal physician of queen dowager Catherine Stenbock, and in 1594 she married thirdly to the nobleman Peder Kristensson Siöblad of Flättna, governor of Nyköping Castle, with whom she had a daughter.
