= Anna Maria Clodt =

Swedish courtier

Anna Maria Clodt (died 1708), was a Swedish courtier. She served as a Danish agent at the Swedish Royal Court and was widely reputed and consulted by supplicants for her contacts and acquired a great deal of influence.

She was the daughter of Baron Gustaf Adolph Clodt and Brita Stuart and married Baron Åke Rålamb in 1689. She served as lady-in-waiting to Queen Hedvig Eleonora in 1668–1680, Queen Ulrika Eleonora in 1680–1693 and to Princess Ulrika Eleonora of Sweden in 1693–1708. She became a personal friend of the queen and are counted as belonging to the circle of intimate friends to the queen along with the royal chaplain confessor Johan Carlberg, Maria Elisabeth Stenbock and Sophia Amalia Marschalk.

She used her position as a courtier by creating a net of influential contacts, which she could use to forward requests and make recommendations from supplicants to power holders at court in exchange for money. This was a common way for a female courtier to earn money, but Clodt was very successful in her line of business, especially since she was somewhat of a favorite of Queen Ulrika Eleonora. Already in 1673, she stated in a letter that she was consulted so often by clients that she had grown weary of it. She also accepted foreign clients, which in fact made her a spy: she acted as an informer of Bolle Luxdorph (Danish envoy to Sweden in 1691–1698).
