= Carl Gyllenhielm =

Swedish soldier and politician

Baron Carl Gyllenhielm
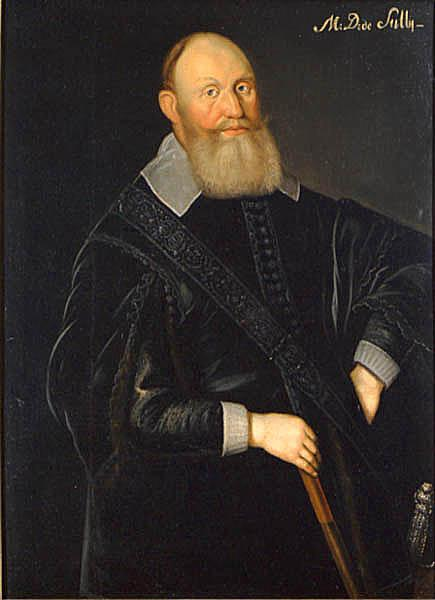
- Carl Carlsson Gyllenhielm, by Jacob Heinrich Elbfas

Governor-General of Ingria
- In office 1617–1620
- Preceded by: Office created
- Succeeded by: Gabriel Bengtsson Oxenstierna
- Monarch: Gustavus Adolphus

Lord High Admiral of Sweden
- In office 1620–1650
- Preceded by: Göran Nilsson Gyllenstierna
- Succeeded by: Gabriel Bengtsson Oxenstierna

Personal details
- Born: 4 March 1574
- Died: 17 March 1650 (aged 76) Karlberg Palace, Solna
- Occupation: Statesman

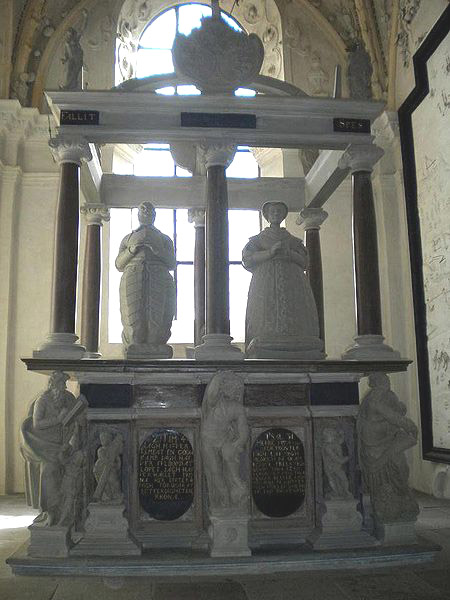
Grave monument for Gyllenhielm and wife in Strängnäs Cathedral

Baron Carl Carlsson Gyllenhielm (4 March 1574 – 17 March 1650) was a Swedish soldier and politician. He was made a baron (friherre) in 1615, appointed Field Marshal in 1616, Privy Councilor in 1617, Governor General of Ingria in 1617 and served as Lord High Admiral from 1620 until his death.

== Biography ==
He was an illegitimate son of Duke Carl, later King Charles IX of Sweden, and Karin Nilsdotter, the daughter of a clergyman from Östergötland. He was raised at the royal estate of Julita Abbey (Julita gård) in Södermanland. He was thus the older half-brother of King Gustavus Adolphus of Sweden. It was the tradition in Sweden in this period that noble children born out of wedlock were acknowledged by their fathers, as long as they were not the product of adultery. Carl Carlsson was ennobled in 1592 with the surname Gyllenhielm and entered the service of the crown as a soldier. He served with the navy in the 1590s before moving to the army during the Swedish-Polish War (1600-11).

He was captured by the enemy in Poland in 1601 and remained a prisoner of war for twelve years. After attempting to escape, he was forced to wear leg irons for the last six and a half years of his captivity. He was freed in 1613, and shortly after raised to the rank of baron and field marshal by his half-brother, the king.

On 27 February 1617 the Treaty of Stolbovo ended the Ingrian War (1610–1617), fought between the Swedish Empire and Russia. From 1617, Gyllenhielm was the governor general of the province of Ingria, until he returned to Sweden in 1620 to become Lord High Admiral. Admirals in this period were expected to lead the navy at sea as well as administrate, but Gyllenhielm did not often take command himself. He delegated much of the day-to-day business of the navy to Clas Fleming, and focused his naval efforts on overseeing the navy's finances. In September 1628, he served as the chairman of the tribunal convened to investigate the loss of the new warship Vasa.

After the death of Gustavus Adolphus in Germany during 1632, Gyllenhielm was responsible for returning his half-brother's body to Sweden. In the following year, he was appointed to the regency government which ruled in the name of Queen Christina of Sweden during her minority, until 1644. He built Karlberg Palace to the northwest of Stockholm and spent his last years there. He died at Karlberg in 1650, and was buried at Strängnäs Cathedral. Karlberg was eventually taken over as an administrative headquarters for the Swedish military, but several of the central reception rooms are preserved as they were in Gyllenhielm's lifetime.

== Other sources ==
- Glete, Jan (2010) Swedish Naval Administration: Resource flows and organizational capacity (Leiden: Brill) ISBN 978-90-47-44151-9
