= Carl Philip of Sweden =

Carl Philip, Charles Philip or Karl Filip of Sweden may refer to:

- Charles Philip, Duke of Södermanland, Prince of Sweden 1601
- Prince Carl Philip, Duke of Värmland, Prince of Sweden 1979
