= Sophia Amalia Marschalk =

Danish noble and courtier

Sophia Amalia Marschalk, also called Anna Marschalk, was a Danish noble and courtier. She was the favorite of the queen of Sweden, Ulrika Eleonora of Denmark.

Marschalk became the maid of honor to Ulrika Eleonora in 1678, and followed her to Sweden upon her marriage to king Charles XI of Sweden in 1680. She was described as the favorite and confidant of Ulrika Eleonora, and belonged to her circle of intimate friends alongside the queen's confessor Johan Carlberg, her mistress of the Robes Maria Elisabet Stenbock and Anna Maria Clodt. She also functioned as a secretary in the queen's many charity projects. Marschalk was an important profile at court because of her access to the queen and her ability to give others access to her, and she was therefore much courted by supplicants, so much so that she was once said to be harder to get access to than the queen herself: in 1685, Catharina Wallenstedt mentions that Marschalk was harder to get access to than the queen, and when she finally agreed to a meeting, she stated that this was a success as great as if the queen herself had arrived and that many would have envied her the success.

Sophia Amalia Marschalk was made a good impression in Sweden and was admired as a role model for her ability to converse and deport herself in social life. After the death of Ulrika Eleonora in 1693, Sophia Amalia Marschalk left Sweden for Germany, where she reportedly joined an Evangelic convent. She later left the convent, however, and converted to Catholicism. She died in Paris.
