= Christina of Holstein-Gottorp =

Queen of Sweden from 1604 to 1611

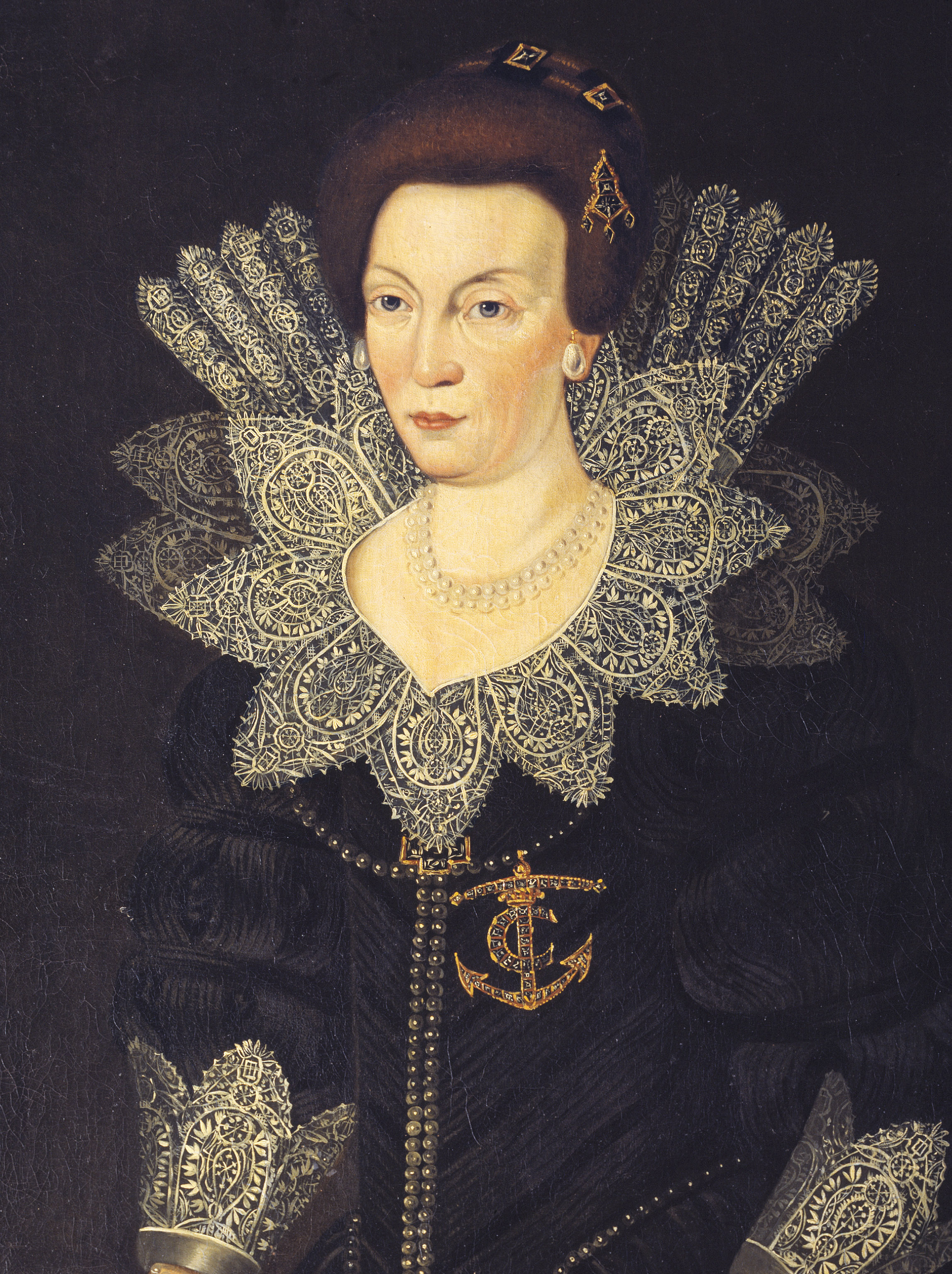

Queen consort of Sweden
- Tenure: 22 March 1604 – 30 October 1611
- Coronation: 15 March 1607
- Born: 13 April 1573; Kiel
- Died: 8 December 1625 (aged 52); Gripsholm Castle
- Spouse: Charles IX of Sweden (m. 1592; died 1611)
- Issue: Princess Christina; Gustav II Adolf of Sweden; Princess Maria Elizabeth, Duchess of Östergötland; Prince Charles Philip, Duke of Södermanland
- House: Holstein-Gottorp
- Father: Adolf, Duke of Holstein-Gottorp
- Mother: Christine of Hesse

Christina of Holstein-Gottorp (13 April 1573 in Kiel – 8 December 1625 at Gripsholm Castle) was Queen of Sweden as the second wife of King Charles IX. She served as regent in 1605, during the absence of her spouse, and in 1611, during the minority of her son, King Gustav II Adolph.

== Biography ==
Christina was the daughter of Adolf, Duke of Holstein-Gottorp, and Christine of Hesse (daughter of Philip I, Landgrave of Hesse). In 1586, she was suggested as a bride for Sigismund of Poland, but nothing came of plans to marry him. On 8 July 1592, she became the second spouse of Charles, Duke of Södermanland, who in 1599 became Sweden's regent and in 1604 its king. She was crowned together with her spouse in Uppsala Cathedral in 1607. According to legend, she encouraged her spouse to conquer the throne from Sigismund in 1598 because of her disappointment that she was never married to Sigismund.

=== Queen ===
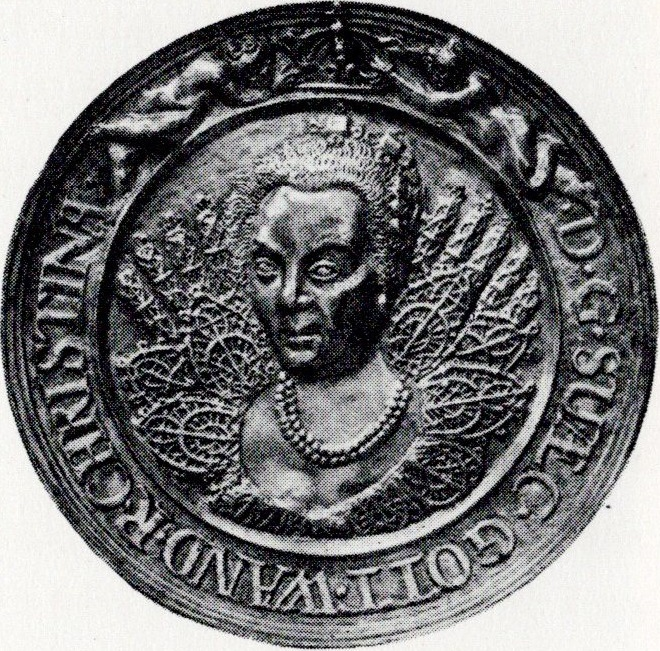
Medal for the queen about 1610

Queen Christina was a domineering and strong-willed person with a strong sense of economy. She was both respected and feared. She has been described as hard, stubborn and stingy, and it is claimed that while the former wife of her spouse always tried to persuade him to show leniency in his acts, Christina did the opposite. She executed a very strict control over the court, which is illustrated by the anecdote that she measured up the sewing-thread for her servants in person. Her marriage has been described as happy, as they were very similar in personality. She accompanied him to Estonia and Finland in 1600–1601.

Christina is not considered to have dominated her likewise dominant and temperamental spouse, but she did not lack political significance and influence. Although her spouse did not let her dictate policy, he did ask her for advice in political matters. During the war with Denmark, he disregarded her advice and came to be in conflict with her because he suspected her to be pro-Danish. In 1604, Charles IX left instructions that she should be regent of the guardian government in the case he should die if their son and heir was still minor, and in 1605, she acted as regent during her spouse's absence in Livonia. She is also known to have prevented the election of her younger son Charles Philip to the throne of the Russian Czar in 1610–1612 by keeping him at home from the Russian election when he was to be sent to Moscow. She was reportedly relieved when the affair was terminated in 1614.

=== Queen dowager ===
Upon the death of her spouse on 30 October 1611, she became regent during the minority of her son, as was instructed in the act of 1604. She shared the regency with John, Duke of Östergötland. As her son was almost of legal age, however, her reign did not last longer than from October to December of that year, and was automatically terminated on her son's birthday 9 December, when he reached legal majority.

During her son's first years as king in the 1610s, she was considered by some the real, or one of the real, rulers behind the throne, even though she was no longer formally regent. She certainly acted as adviser for her son. He asked for her advice regarding the marriage of her daughter in 1612, which proved to cause a conflict with the Lutheran church. She had in fact suggested that marriage herself for political reasons and was determined to see it through, and she also arranged the marriage of her step daughter Catherine against the will of the council in 1615.

As a dowager queen, she is known for preventing her son from marrying Ebba Brahe, an affair which was drawn out for several years in 1613–1615. Her reason was her preference for the political benefit a dynastic marriage could have, and her fear of the complications a marriage with a noble could have, and she regarded the precedence of queen Gunilla Bielke, who had been accused of undue political influence and favoring of her relatives, as a bad example. During this affair, she wrote a famous poem on the window of Ebba Brahe, which goes : "This you want, that you shall – that is the way in cases as this".

While her regency of her eldest son was very short, she also served as regent during the minority of her younger son Charles Philip, Duke of Södermanland in the Duchy of Södermanland from 1611 to 1622, as the Duchy was in fact almost autonomous. She resided in Nyköping Castle, from where she managed the iron mines of her spouse and took an active interest in business. During her reign, the Duchy became the center of the Cereal export and iron- and weapon manufacture and one of the largest financiers of the crown. She also guarded and defended the autonomy of the duchies against the crown, which was about to lead to a conflict with her son the king.

In 1622, however, her youngest son Charles Philip died, and she retired from public life altogether and settled in her dower. After his death, his secret marriage to Elisabet Ribbing was discovered, and she became the guardian of his daughter Elisabet Gyllenhielm (1622–1682).

== Children ==
1. Christina (26 November 1593– 25 May 1594)
2. Gustavus Adolphus (Gustav II Adolf; 9 December 1594– 16 November 1632), King of Sweden from 1611 to 1632
3. Maria Elizabeth (10 March 1596– 7 August 1618), married her first cousin John, Duke of Östergötland, youngest son of King John III of Sweden
4. Charles Philip (22 April 1601– 25 January 1622), Duke of Södermanland
5. A stillborn son (20 July 1606)

== Ancestors ==
Ancestors of Christina of Holstein-Gottorp

16. Dietrich, Count of Oldenburg
8. Christian I of Denmark
17. Hedvig of Holstein
4. Frederick I of Denmark
18. John, Margrave of Brandenburg-Kulmbach
9. Dorothea of Brandenburg
19. Barbara of Saxe-Wittenberg
2. Adolf, Duke of Holstein-Gottorp
20. Eric II, Duke of Pomerania
10. Bogislaw X, Duke of Pomerania
21. Sophia of Pomerania-Stolp
5. Sophie of Pomerania
22. Casimir IV Jagiellon
11. Anna Jagiellon
23. Elizabeth of Austria
1. Christina of Holstein-Gottorp
24. Louis II, Landgrave of Lower Hesse
12. William II, Landgrave of Hesse
25. Mechthild of Württemberg-Urach
6. Philip I, Landgrave of Hesse
26. Magnus II, Duke of Mecklenburg
13. Anna of Mecklenburg-Schwerin
27. Sophie of Pomerania-Stettin
3. Christine of Hesse
28. Albert III, Duke of Saxony
14. George, Duke of Saxony
29. Sidonie Podiebrad
7. Christine of Saxony
30. Casimir IV Jagiellon (= 22)
15. Barbara Jagiellon
31. Elizabeth of Austria (= 23)

Christina of Holstein-Gottorp House of Holstein-Gottorp Cadet branch of the House of Oldenburg Born: 13 April 1573 Died: 8 December 1625
Royal titles
Vacant Title last held by Anna of Austria	Queen consort of Sweden; 1604–1611	Vacant Title next held by Maria Eleonora of Brandenburg
