= Elizabeth Gyllenhielm =

Swedish Lady-in-waiting (1622-1682)

Elizabeth Carlsdotter Gyllenhielm (Swedish: Elisabet; 1622-1682), was the daughter of the Swedish prince Charles Philip, Duke of Södermanland, in his secret marriage to the noble Elizabeth Ribbing.

Elizabeth Carlsdotter was born posthumously after the death of her father, and it was not until after his death that the marriage of her parents was revealed. Though legitimate, she was granted the name Gyllenhielm, a name previously often granted to illegitimate children of royalty: she herself, however, referred to herself only by her patronymic Elizabeth Carlsdotter. She was raised at the court of her paternal grandmother, Queen dowager Christina.

Prior to her marriage, she served as maid of honor to Queen dowager Maria Eleonora and to her cousin, the reigning Queen Christina of Sweden. She married the noble Axel Turesson Natt och Dag in 1645. Between 1654 and 1660, she served as Chief Court Mistress to the Queen Hedwig Eleonora.

In 1660, she married the noble and courtier Balthasar Marschalck. She had one son in her first marriage, who died childless.

Court offices
Preceded by Maria Sofia De la Gardie (With Barbro Fleming)	Chief Court Mistress of the Queen of Sweden; 1655–1660	Succeeded by Maria Elisabeth Stenbock
Preceded by None	Chief Court Mistress of Hedwig Eleonora; 1655–1660	Succeeded by Görwel Bååt
