= Maria Elisabeth Stenbock =

Swedish mistress to the queen of Denmark

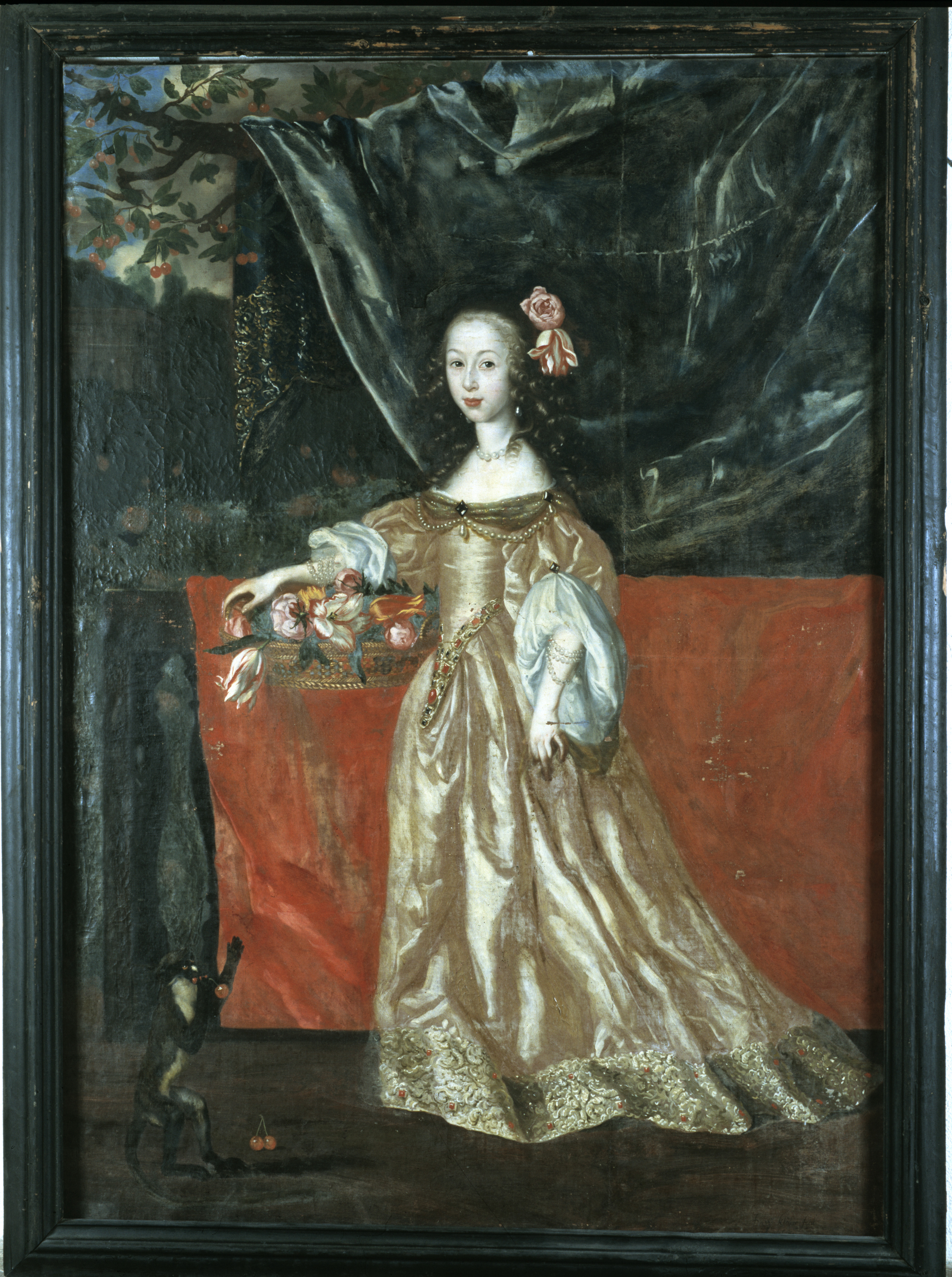
- Maria Elisabeth Stenbock
- Died: 1693
- Citizenship: Sweden
- Occupation: Mistress of the Robes to Queen Ulrika Eleonora
- Years active: 1680-1693
- Spouse: Count Axel Axelsson Lillie (1665)
- Parents: Fredrik Stenbock; Catharina De la Gardie

Maria Elisabeth Stenbock (died 1693) was a Swedish courtier, and Mistress of the Robes to Queen Ulrika Eleonora of Denmark from 1680 to 1693.

== Life ==
Born to Count Fredrik Stenbock and Catharina De la Gardie, she married Count Axel Axelsson Lillie in 1665. In 1680, she was appointed to the post of senior lady-in-waiting to the new queen of Sweden Ulrika Eleonora. She became a personal friend of the Queen and are counted as belonging to the circle of intimate friends to the Queen along with the royal chaplain confessor Johan Carlberg, Sophia Amalia Marschalk and Anna Maria Clodt.

There is a well-known old legend associated with her death: the legend states that while Queen Ulrika Eleonora of Denmark lay dying at Karlberg Palace in 1693, her favorite lady-in-waiting and Mistress of the Robes Maria Elisabeth Stenbock lay sick in Stockholm. On the night the Queen had died, Maria Elisabeth Stenbock visited Karlberg and was admitted alone to the room containing the remains of the queen. The officer in charge, Captain Stormcrantz, looked into the key hole and saw Maria and the Queen speaking at the window of the room. He was so shocked by the sight that he started coughing up blood. Maria Elisabeth Stenbock, as well as the carriage she had arrived with, was gone the next moment. When the matter was investigated, it was made clear that Maria had been in bed, gravely ill that day and not left town. The King gave the order that the affair was not to be mentioned further. Whatever the explanation, it is true that Maria Elisabeth Stenbock died of her illness a couple of weeks after the Queen, and that Captain Stormcrantz also did so shortly after the event he claimed took place.

Court offices
Preceded by Elisabet Carlsdotter Gyllenhielm	Mistress of the Robes to the Queen of Sweden; 1680-1693	Succeeded by Katarina Ebba Horn af Åminne
