= Charles IX of Sweden =

King of Sweden from 1604 to 1611

Charles IX
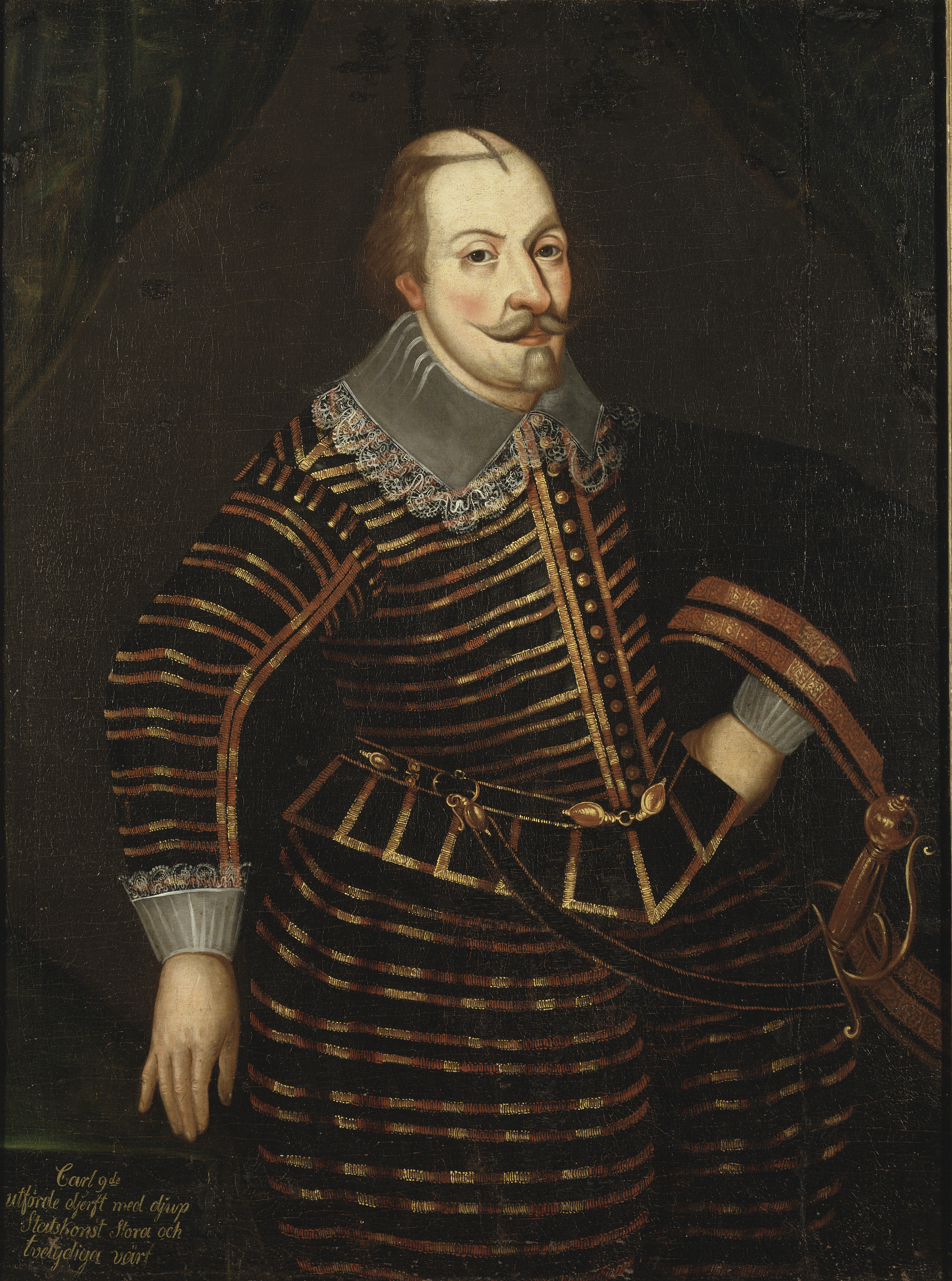
- Charles IX by an unknown artist, Nationalmuseum

King of Sweden
- Reign: 22 March 1604 – 30 October 1611
- Coronation: 15 March 1607
- Predecessor: Sigismund
- Successor: Gustavus Adolphus
- Born: 4 October 1550; Stockholm Castle, Stockholm, Sweden
- Died: 30 October 1611 (aged 61); Nyköping Castle, Nyköping, Sweden
- Burial: 21 April 1612; Strängnäs Cathedral
- Spouses: Maria of Palatinate-Simmern (m. 1579; died 1589) Christina of Holstein-Gottorp (m. 1592)
- Issue Detail: Princess Margareta; Princess Elisabeth; Prince Louis; Catherine, Countess Palatine of Kleeburg; Prince Gustav; Princess Maria; Princess Christina; Gustavus Adolphus; Princess Maria Elizabeth, Duchess of Östergötland; Prince Charles Philip, Duke of Södermanland; Carl Gyllenhielm (ill.)
- House: Vasa
- Father: Gustav I of Sweden
- Mother: Margaret Leijonhufvud
- Religion: Lutheran

Charles IX, also Carl IX (Note: Both Charles and Eric XIV took their regnal numbers according to a fictitious history of Sweden. He was actually the third Swedish king called Charles (Carl).) (Swedish: Karl IX; 4 October 1550 – 30 October 1611), reigned as King of Sweden from 1604 until 1611. He was the youngest son of King Gustav I (r. 1523–1560) and his second wife, Margaret Leijonhufvud, the brother of King John III and half-brother of King Erik XIV, and the uncle of Sigismund, who became king both of Sweden and of Poland. By his father's will, Charles received, by way of appanage, the Duchy of Södermanland, which included the provinces of Närke and Värmland; but he did not come into actual possession of them till after the fall of Eric and the succession to the throne of John in 1569.

He came into the throne by championing the Protestant cause during the increasingly tense times of religious strife between competing sects of Christianity. Just under a decade after his death, these would re-ignite in the Thirty Years' War of 1618–1648. These conflicts had already caused the dynastic squabble rooted in religious freedom that deposed Charles' nephew (Sigismund III) and brought Charles to rule as king of Sweden.

His reign marked the start of the final chapter (dated 1648 by some) both of the Reformation and of the Counter-Reformation. With the death of his brother John III of Sweden in November 1592, the Swedish throne went to his nephew, the Habsburg ally Sigismund of Poland and Sweden. During these tense political times, Charles viewed the inheritance of the throne of Protestant Sweden by his devout Catholic nephew with alarm. Several years of religious controversy and discord followed.

While King Sigismund resided in Poland, Charles and the Swedish privy council ruled in Sigismund's name. After various preliminaries, the Riksdag of the Estates forced Sigismund to abdicate the throne to Charles IX in 1595. This eventually kicked off nearly seven decades of sporadic warfare as the two lines of the divided House of Vasa both continued to attempt to remake the union between the Polish and Swedish thrones with opposing counter-claims and dynastic wars.

Quite likely, the dynastic outcome between the Swedish and Polish representatives of the House of Vasa exacerbated and radicalized the later actions of Europe's Catholic princes in the German states such as the Edict of Restitution of 1629. In fact, it worsened European politics to the abandonment or prevention of settling events by diplomacy and compromise during the vast bloodletting of the Thirty Years' War.

== Early life ==
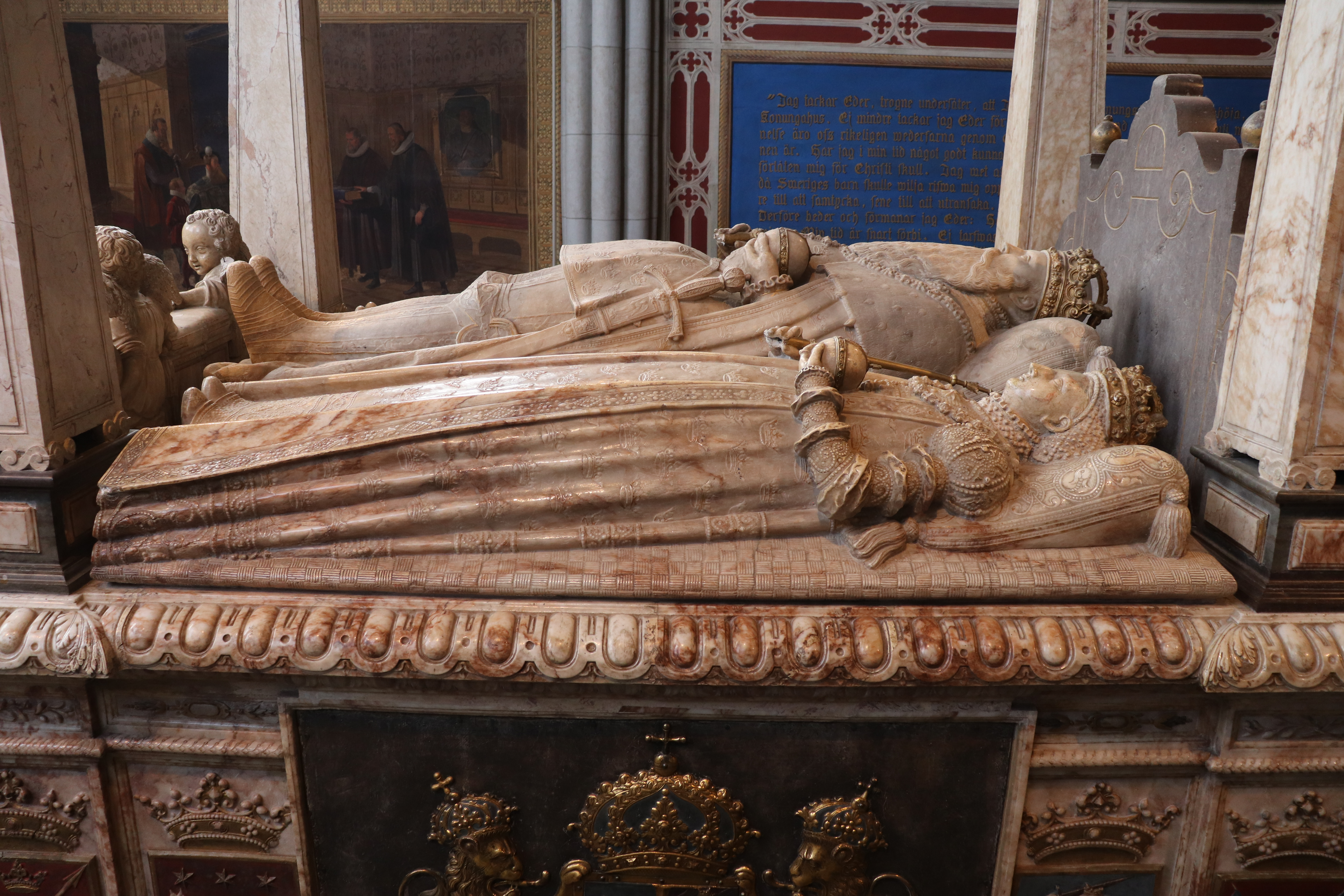
Charles's parents as shown on their grave monument

Charles IX was born on 4 October 1550 at Tre Kronor Castle in Stockholm as the youngest son of King Gustav Vasa and Queen Margaret. He was educated in childhood by his private tutor Jean d'Herboville. Upon Gustav Vasa's death in 1560, Charles received a duchy that included most of Södermanland and Närke, some parishes in Västmanland, part of Vadsbo County in Västergötland, and all of Värmland. According to Gustav Vasa's will, Dukes John (III) and Charles were to have a partially independent position as vassals under their elder brother Erik XIV. After he was crowned king, however, in 1561 he had a Riksdag in Arboga decide to restrict the independence of the duchies, the so-called Arboga Articles. At the age of 15, Charles participated in the Northern Seven Years' War where he commanded the artillery at the conquest of Varberg in 1565.

== Rebel duke ==
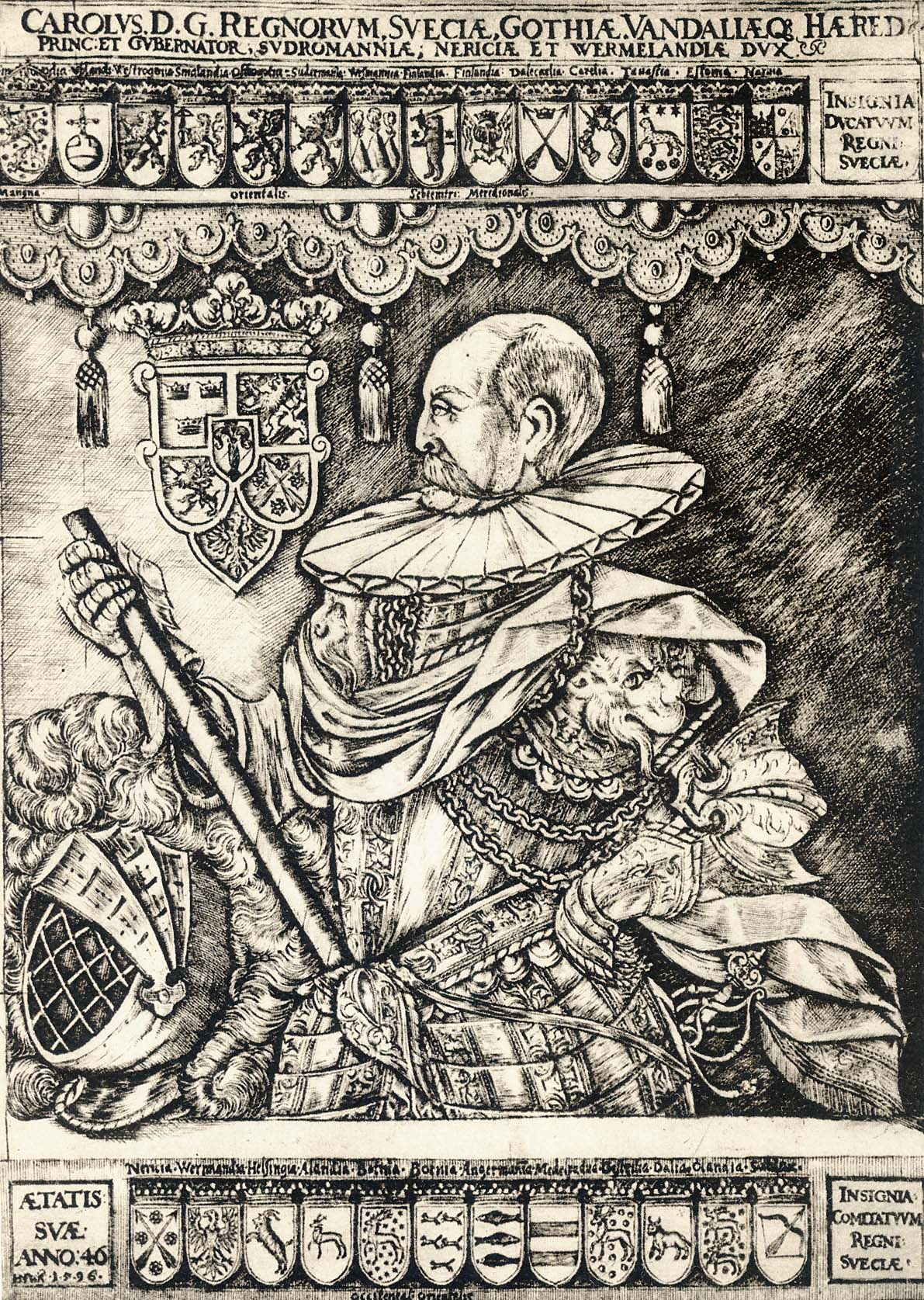
Duke Charles (as he then was called) in 1596 by H. Nützel

In 1568, he was the real leader of the rebellion against Eric XIV. However, he took no part in the designs of his brother John III against the unhappy king after his deposition. Charles's relations with John were always more or less strained. He was at least suspected of being implicated in the Mornay Plot to depose John III in 1574, and was one of the alternative regents suggested by the conspirators of the 1576 Plot. He had no sympathy with John's High-Church tendencies on the one hand, and he sturdily resisted all the king's endeavours to restrict his authority as Duke of Södermanland on the other. The nobility and the majority of the Riksdag of the Estates supported John. However, in his endeavours to unify the realm, and Charles had consequently (1587) to resign his pretensions to autonomy within his duchy. But, steadfast Lutheran as he was, on the religious question, he was immovable. The matter came to a crisis on the death of John III in 1592. The heir to the throne was John's eldest son, Sigismund III Vasa, already king of Poland and a devoted Catholic. The fear that Sigismund might re-catholicize the land alarmed the Protestant majority in Sweden—particularly the commoners and lower nobility, and Charles came forward as their champion, and also as the defender of the Vasa dynasty against foreign interference.

It was due entirely to him that Sigismund as king-elect was forced to confirm the resolutions at the Uppsala Synod in 1593, thereby recognizing the fact that Sweden was essentially a Lutheran Protestant state. Under the agreement, Charles and the Swedish Privy Council shared power and ruled in Sigismund's place since he resided in Poland. In the ensuing years 1593–1595, Charles's task was extraordinarily difficult. He had steadily to oppose Sigismund's reactionary tendencies and directives; he had also to curb the nobility, which sought to increase their power at the expense of the absent king, which he did with cruel rigor.

Necessity compelled him to work with the clergy and people rather than the gentry; hence it was that the Riksdag of the Estates assumed under his regency government a power and an importance which it had never possessed before. In 1595, the Riksdag of Söderköping elected Charles regent, and his attempt to force Klas Fleming, governor of Finland, to submit to his authority, rather than to that of the king, provoked a civil war. Charles sought to increase his power and the king attempted to manage the situation by diplomacy over several years, until fed up, Sigismund got permission from the Commonwealth's legislature to pursue the matters dividing his Swedish subjects, and invaded with a mercenary army.

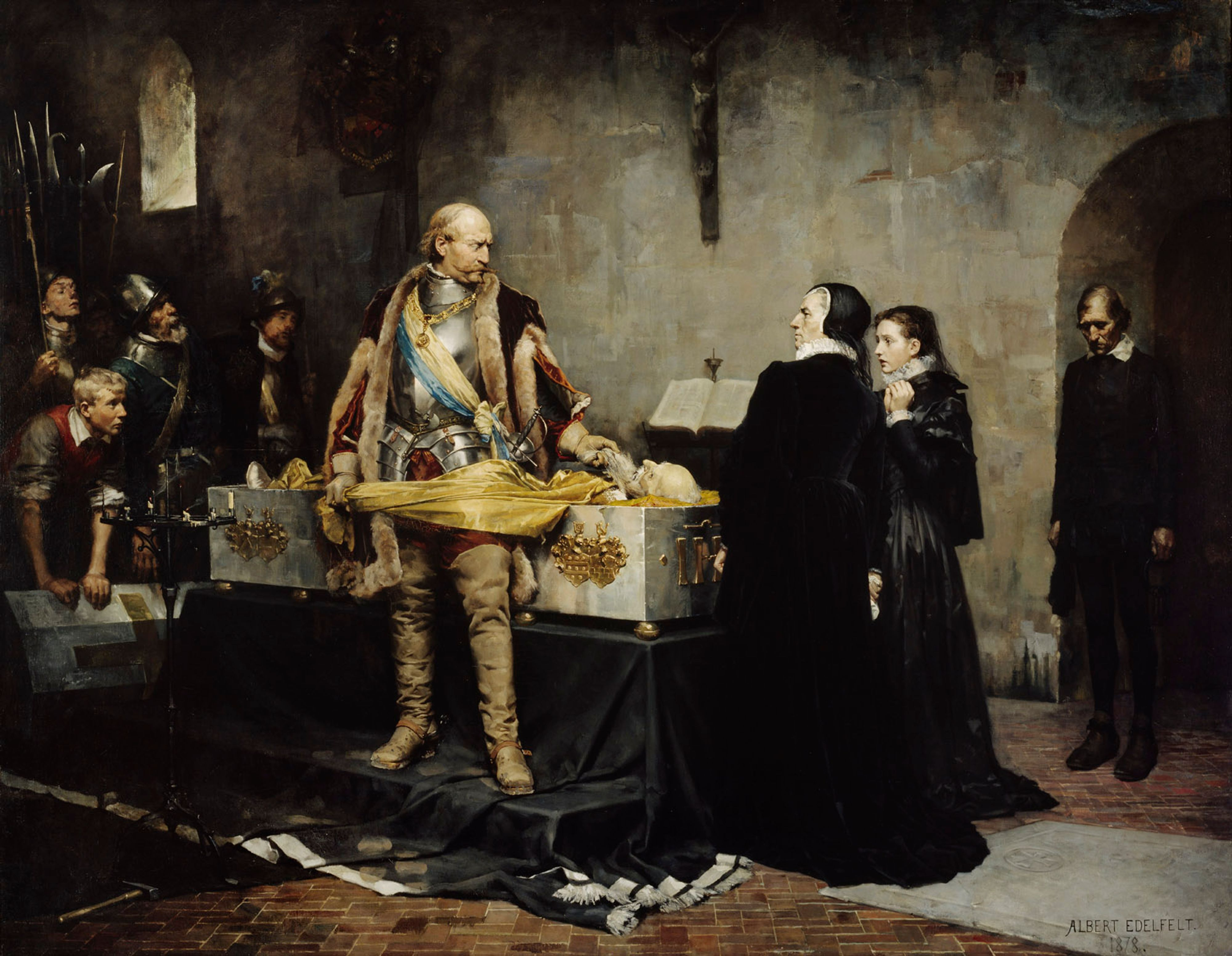
Duke Karl Insulting the Corpse of Klaus Fleming (Painting by Albert Edelfelt, 1878, Fleming's wife Ebba Stenbock on the right)

In April 1597, after having subdued the Cudgel War and preparing to resist the expected invasion of Charles, Fleming died and was succeeded as governor by Arvid Stålarm the Younger. In August 1597, Charles and his army invaded Österland, took Åland, which was the fief of her sister Queen Dowager Catherine, and besieged Turku Castle. Fleming was still not buried, and, according to legend, Charles had the coffin opened to reassure himself that Fleming was indeed dead. After having identified the face of Fleming, he was to have pulled Fleming's beard with the words, "If you had been alive, your head would not have been safe", upon which Fleming's wife Ebba Stenbock replied, "If my late husband was alive, Your Grace would never have been here."

Despite some initial successes, Sigismund lost the decisive Battle of Stångebro and was captured. He was then forced to surrender several Swedish noblemen, whom Charles and the Riksdag of the Estates had named traitors. In August 1599, Charles launched a second expedition to Finland, where he defeated Axel Kurck at S:t Mårtens before successfully laying siege to Viborg. These noblemen were later executed in what became known as the Linköping Bloodbath. With Sigismund defeated and exiled—seen as both an outsider and a heretic by most of the Swedish nation—his formal deposition by the Riksdag of the Estates in 1599 served as both a natural vindication of Charles's actions and a retroactive legitimization of his claim to power. In the same session, the Riksdag named Charles as regent.

== King ==
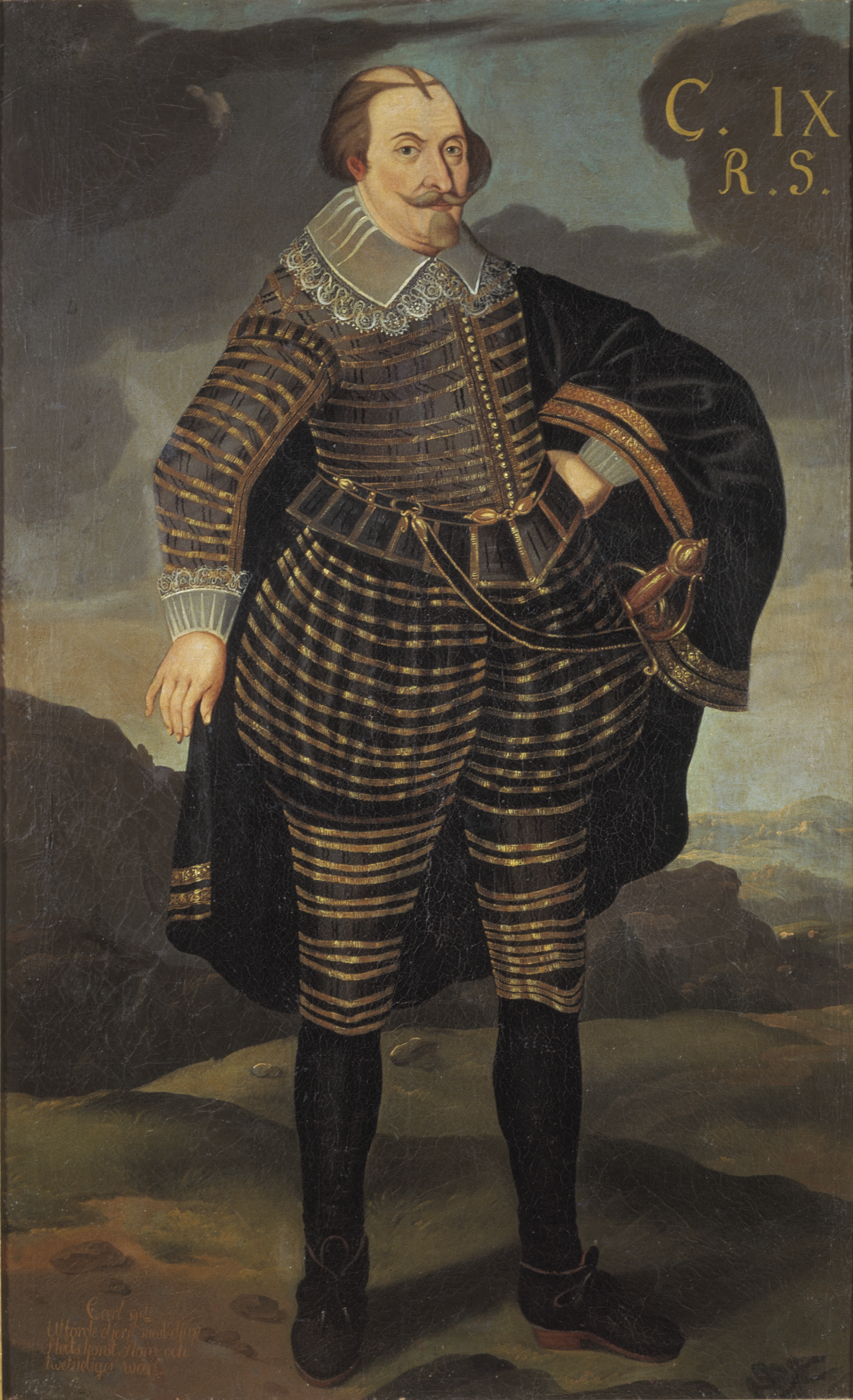
Painting from the Nationalmuseum

Finally, the Riksdag at Linköping on 24 February 1604 declared that Sigismund abdicated the Swedish throne, that duke Charles was recognized as the sovereign. He was declared king as Karl IX (anglicized as Charles IX). Charles's short reign was one of uninterrupted warfare. The hostility of Poland and the breakup of Russia involved him in overseas contests for the possession of Livonia and Ingria, the Polish–Swedish War (1600–1611) and the Ingrian War. During the Polish–Swedish War (1600–1611) Battle of Kircholm, the king narrowly escaped the losing battle after his horse was shot. Henrik Wrede offered his own horse leaving Wrede to be stranded and killed. In the final year of his reign, his claims to all of Lapland west of the Varangerfjord and extending to the Arctic Ocean led to the Kalmar War with Denmark-Norway.

In all these struggles, he was more or less unsuccessful, owing partly to the fact that he and his forces had to oppose superior generals (e.g. Jan Karol Chodkiewicz and Christian IV of Denmark) and partly to sheer ill-luck. Compared with his foreign policy, the domestic policy of Charles IX was comparatively unimportant. It aimed at confirming and supplementing what had already been done during his regency. He did not officially become king until 22 March 1604. The first deed in which the title appears is dated 20 March 1604; but he was not crowned until 15 March 1607.

== Death and legacy ==
Four and a half years later Charles IX died at Nyköping, 30 October 1611 when he was succeeded by his seventeen-year-old son Gustavus Adolphus; he had participated in the wars.

Charles's legacy included his efforts to develop the economy of his duchy before becoming king. He founded towns, including Karlstad and Mariestad, encouraged the cultivation of new land and immigration, and promoted mining, trade and the manufacture of military supplies. Historian Sven Ulric Palme characterized the economic policies of Charles's ducal administration as broadly mercantilist. During his reign, Charles established the Skultuna Brassworks in 1607 to promote domestic brass production and reduce dependence on imports. The company remains in operation at its original site.

His struggle for power was accompanied by the repression of political opponents. Following the deposition of Sigismund, five of the latter's supporters were executed in the Linköping Bloodbath of 1600. By the end of Charles's reign, Sweden was involved in wars with Poland, Russia and Denmark. Writing in the 1911 Encyclopædia Britannica, historian Robert Nisbet Bain portrayed Charles as a link between the reigns of Gustav I and Gustavus Adolphus, while also criticizing his harsh treatment of political opponents.

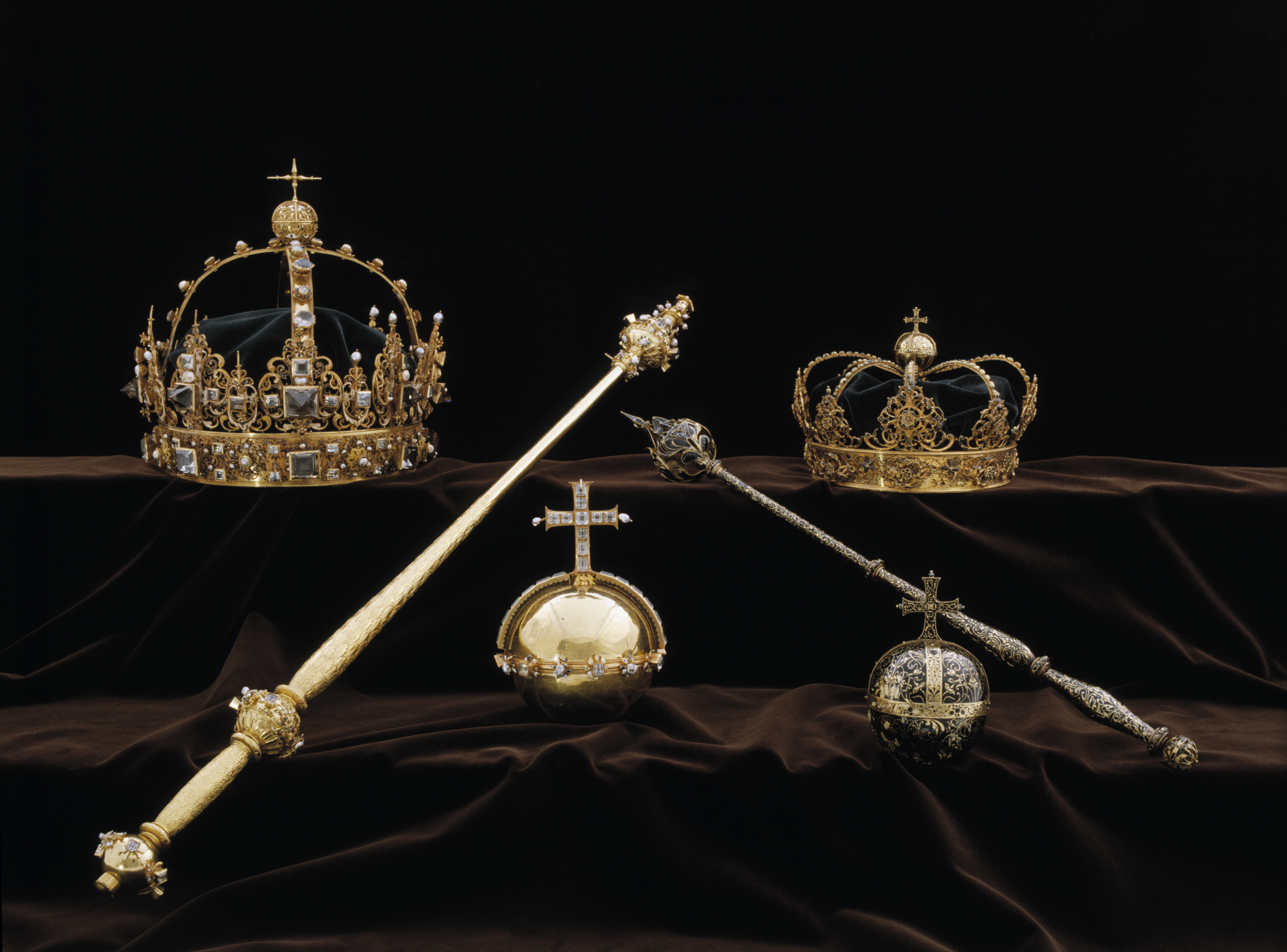
Charles IX's and Queen Christina's funeral regalia once stolen and then found in a rubbish bin

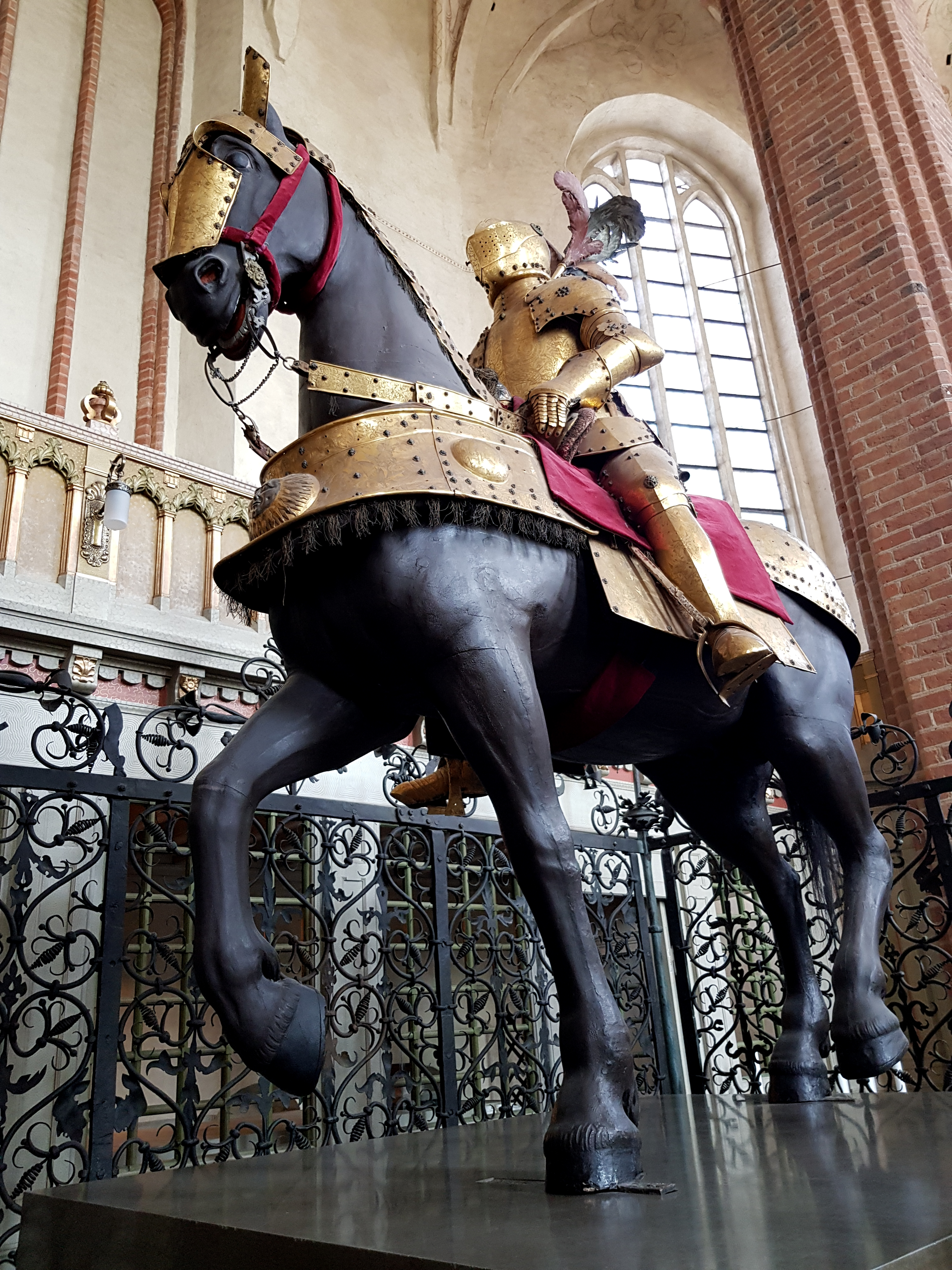
Funeral monument of Carl IX and family at Strängnäs Cathedral, worked on by 12 goldsmiths in 1611

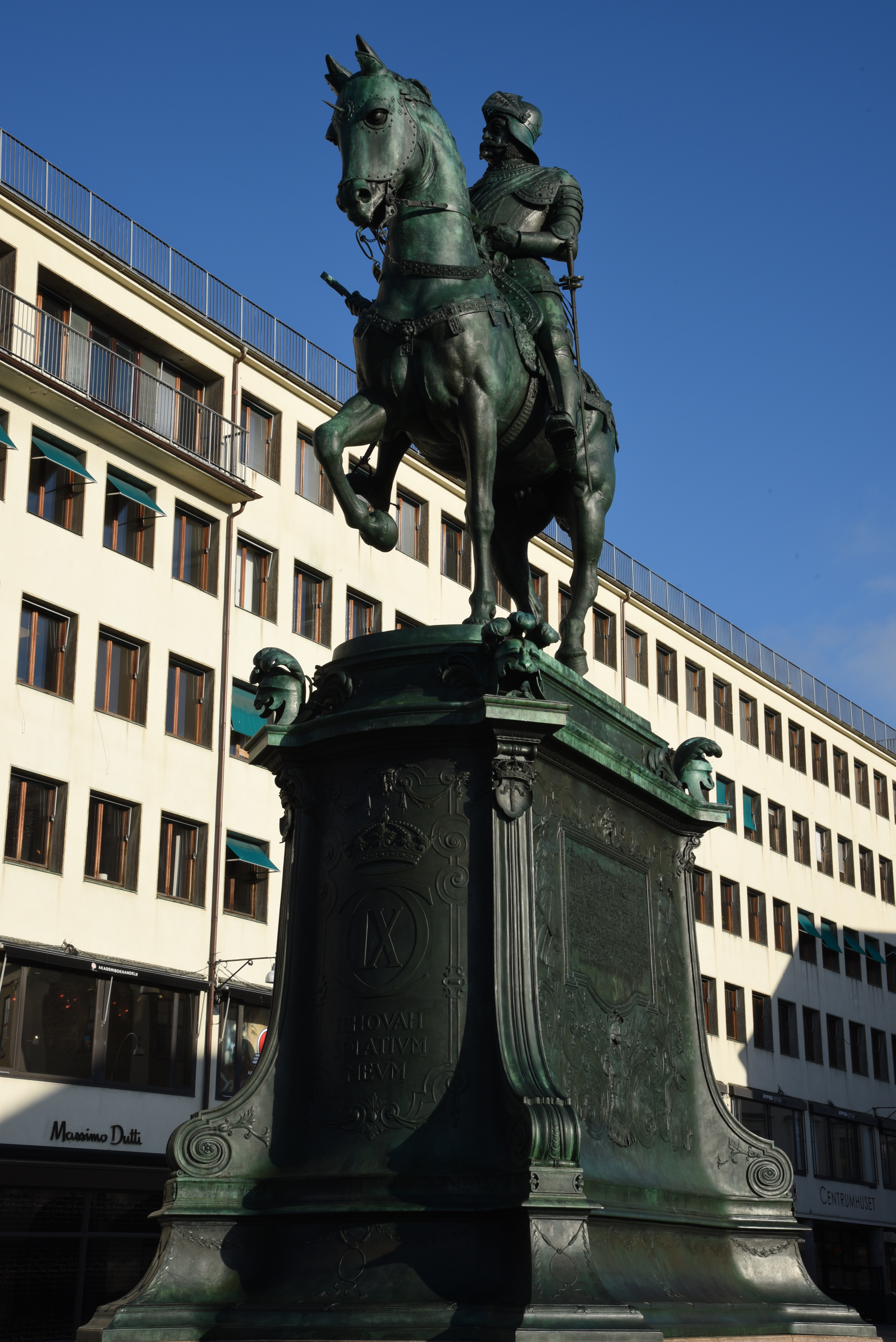
Statue in Göteborg

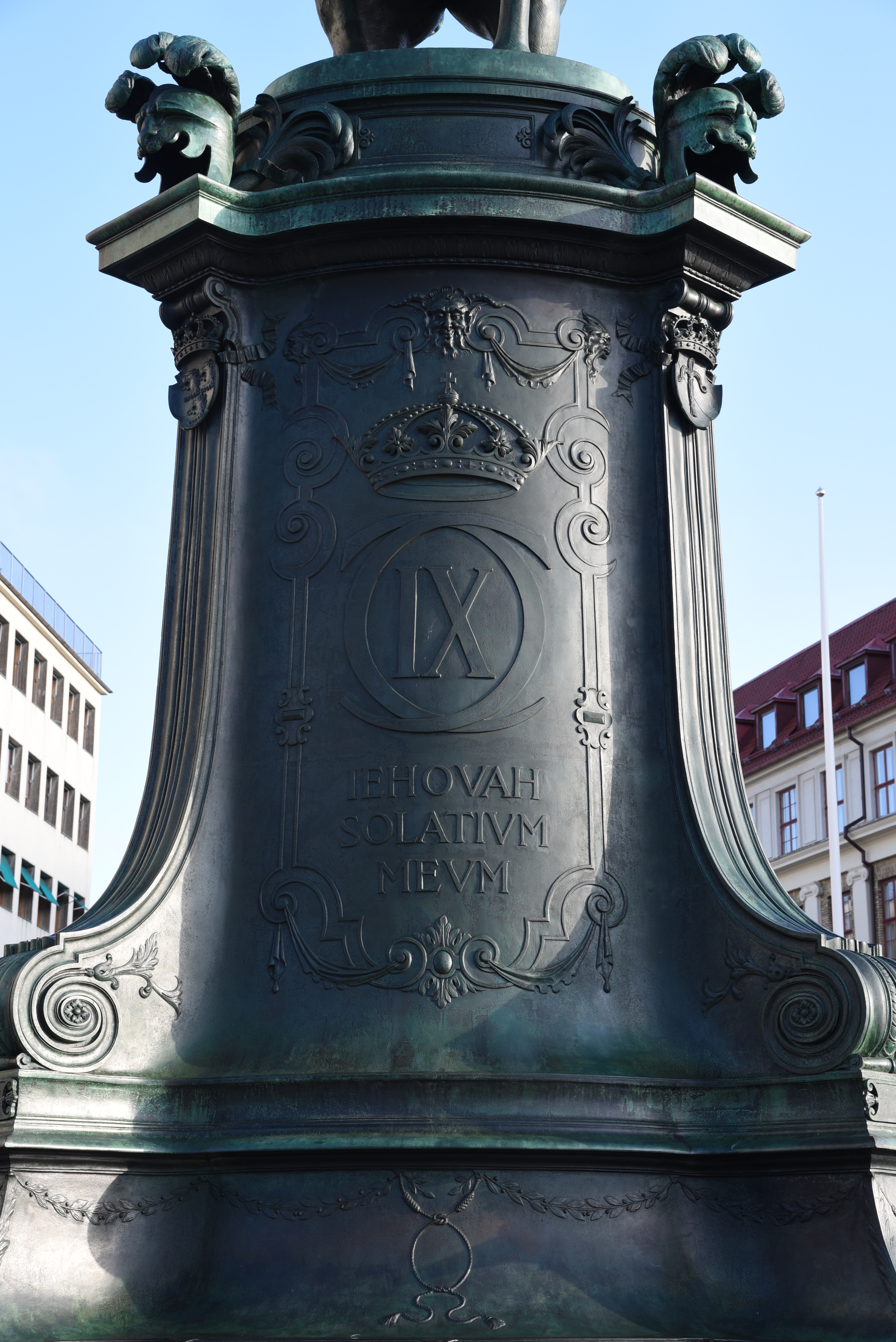
His motto inscribed: Jehovah solatium meum ("Jehovah is my Solace")

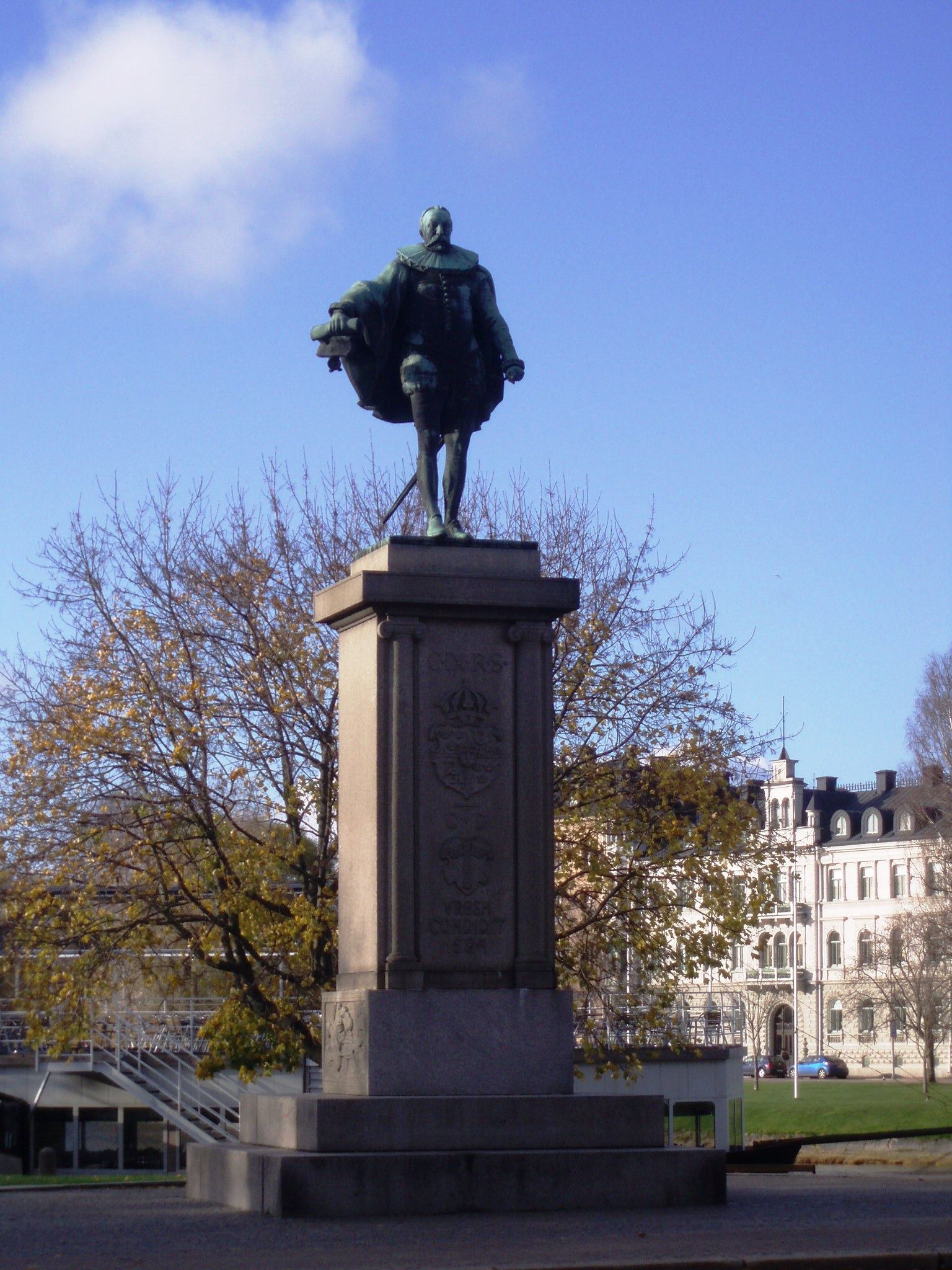
Statue of Charles IX in Karlstad, 1926

== Marriages and children ==
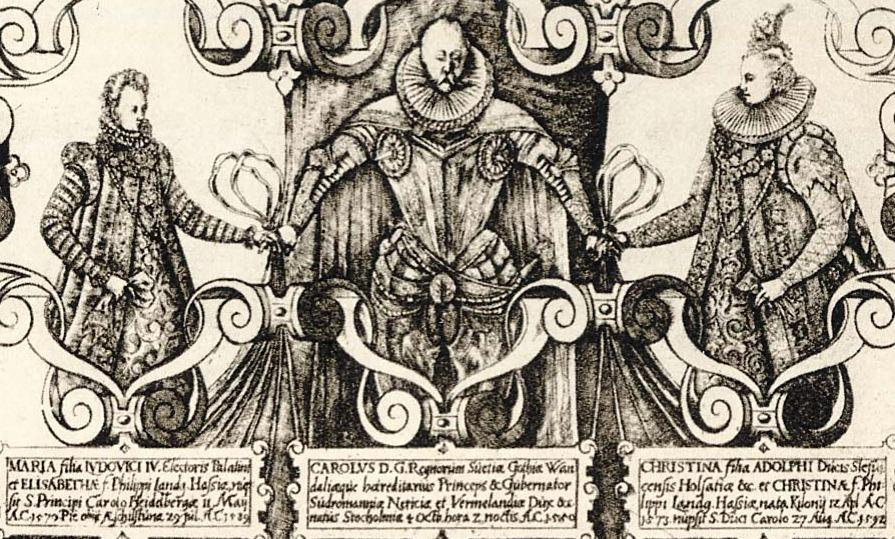
With his first wife Maria and second wife Christina in 1598 by Hieronymus Nützel

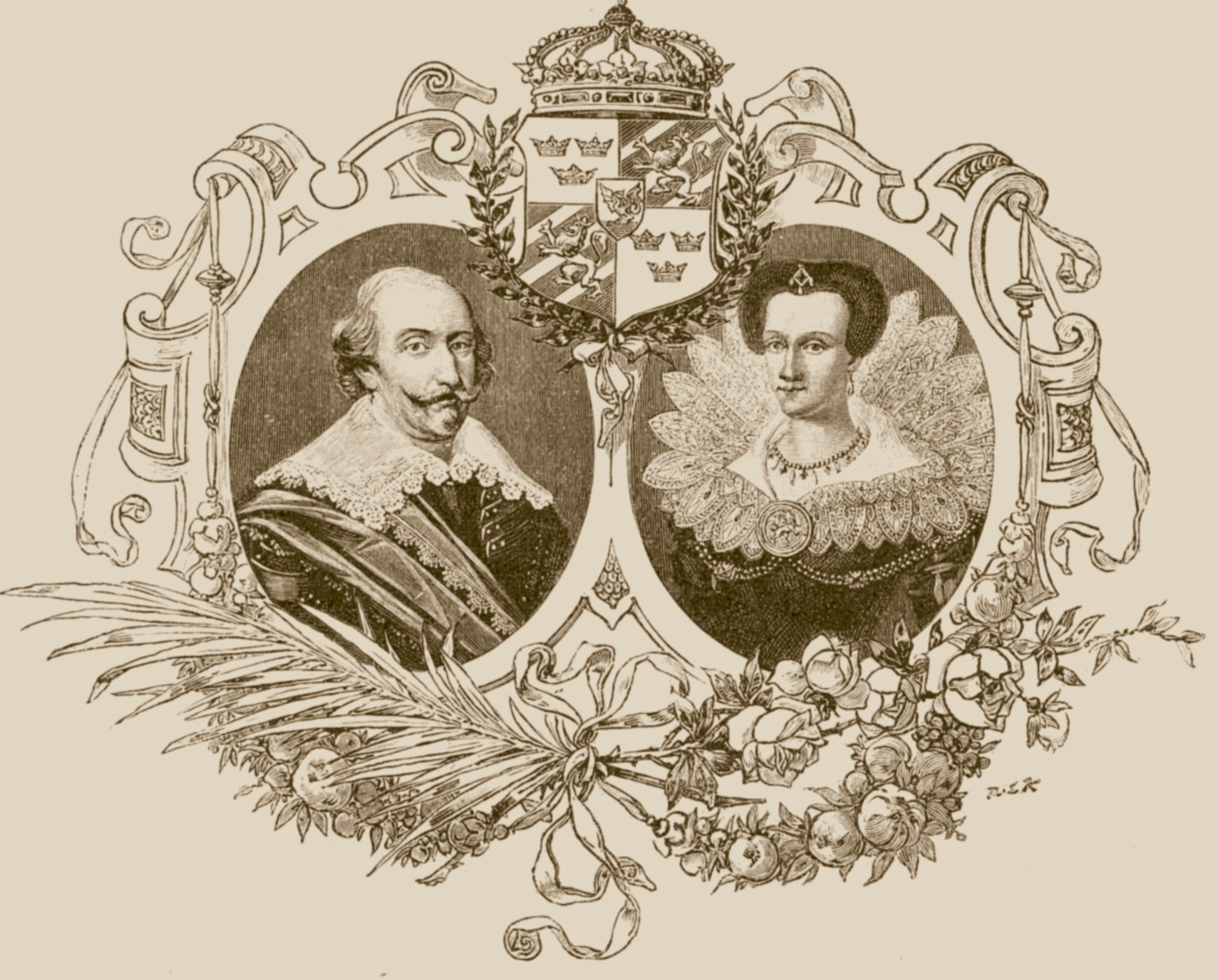
Charles IX with Christina, 17th century

He married, firstly, Anna Marie of Palatinate-Simmern (1561–1589), daughter of Louis VI, Elector Palatine (1539–1583) and Elisabeth of Hesse (1539–1584). Their children were:

- Margareta Elisabeth (1580–1585)
- Elisabeth Sabina (1582–1585)
- Louis (1583–1583)
- Catherine (1584–1638), married a prince of the Palatinate Zweibrücken, becoming mother of Charles X Gustav.
- Gustav (1587–1587)
- Maria (1588–1589)

In 1592 he married his second wife Christina of Holstein-Gottorp (1573–1625), daughter of Adolf of Holstein-Gottorp (1526–1586) and Christine of Hesse (1543–1604), and first cousin of his previous wife. Their children were:

- Christina (1593–1594)
- Gustavus Adolphus of Sweden (Gustav II Adolf) (1594–1632)
- Maria Elizabeth (1596–1618), married her first cousin Duke John, youngest son of John III of Sweden
- Charles Philip (1601–1622)

He also had a son with his mistress, Karin Nilsdotter:

- Carl Carlsson Gyllenhielm (1574–1650), Field Marshal

== Arms ==
Arms of Charles as Prince of Sweden, and Duke of Södermanland

Arms of Charles of Sweden and Marie of Palatine

Arms of Charles of Sweden and Christine of Holstein-Gottorp

Arms of King Charles and Queen Christine of Sweden

== Gallery ==
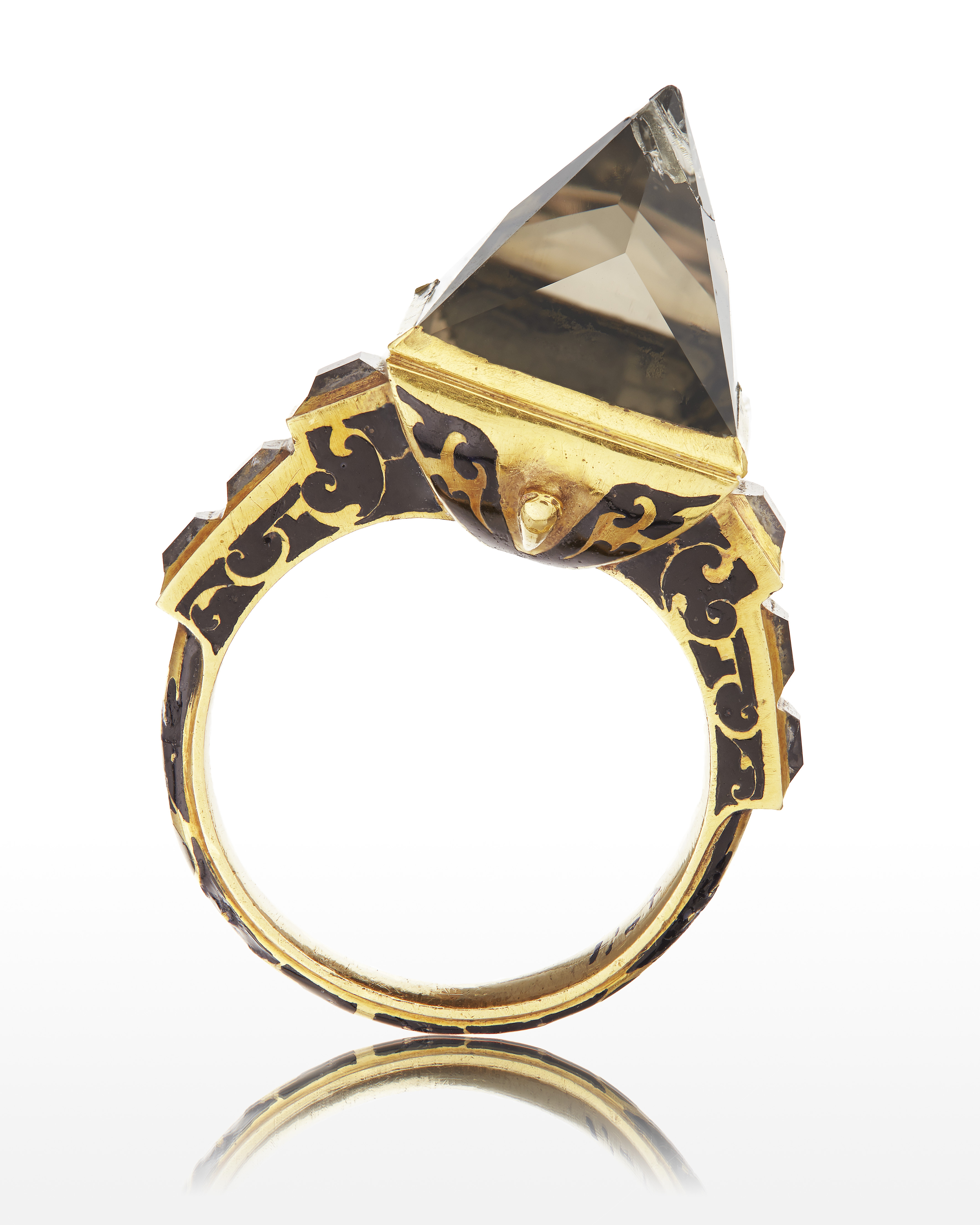
Crowning ring

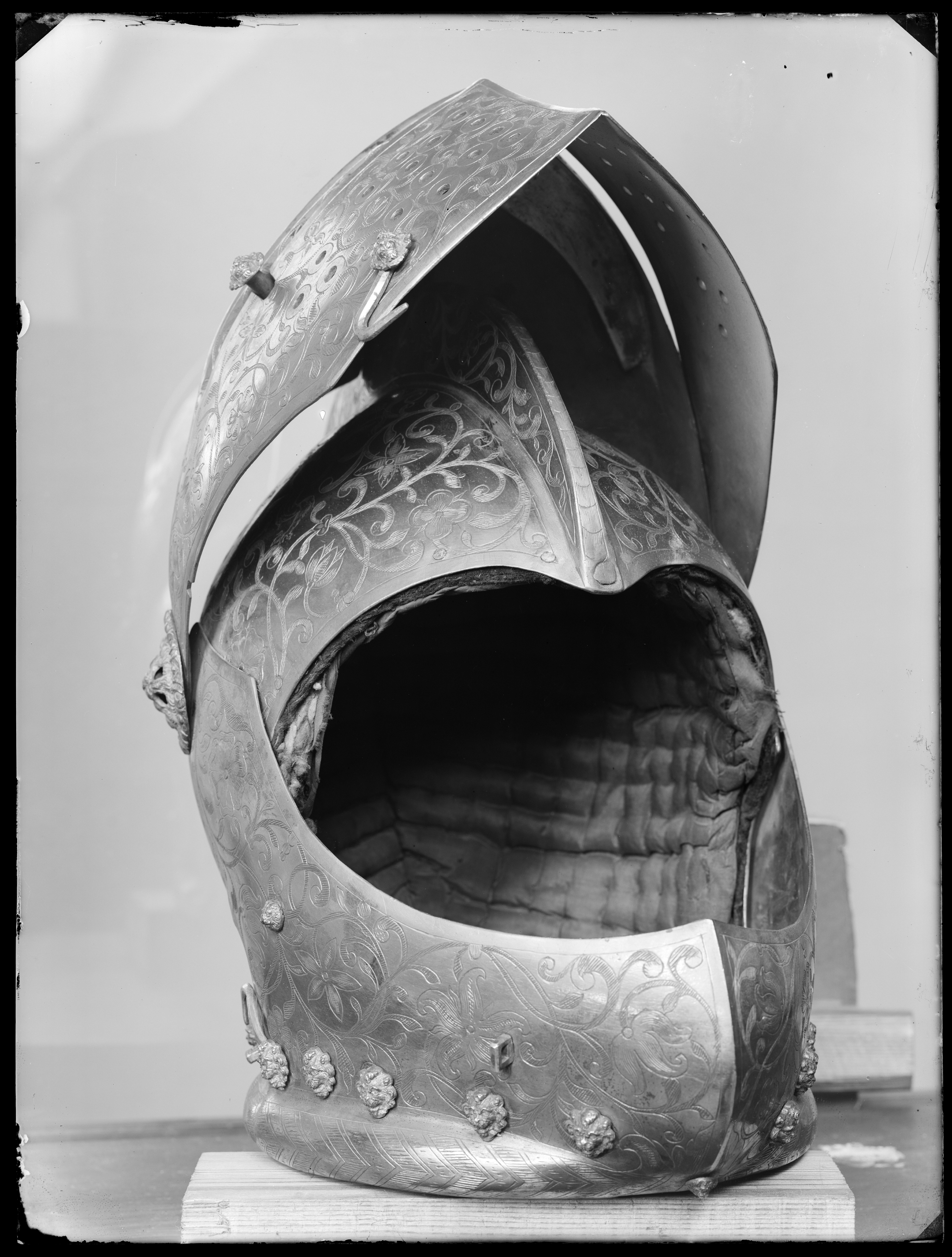
The helmet of the armor opened and photographed, unknown date

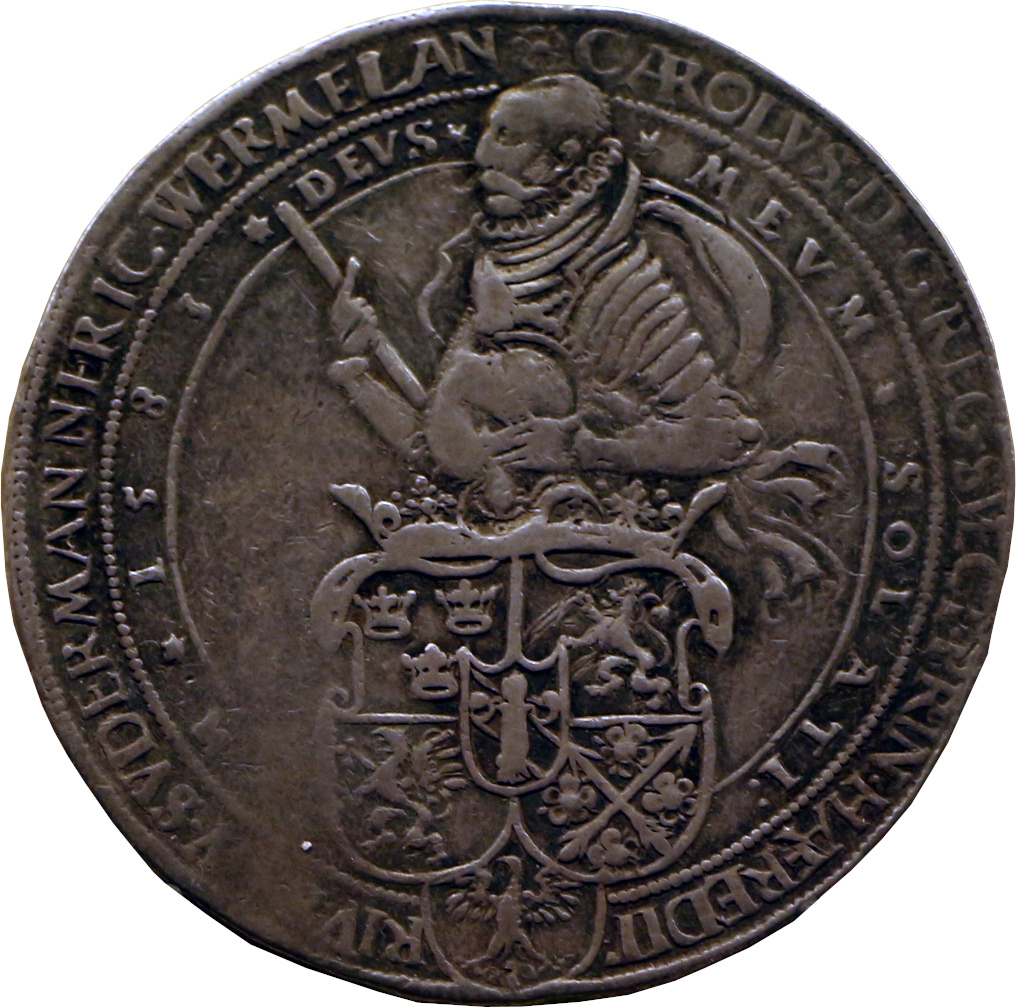
Duke Charles on a coin from 1583

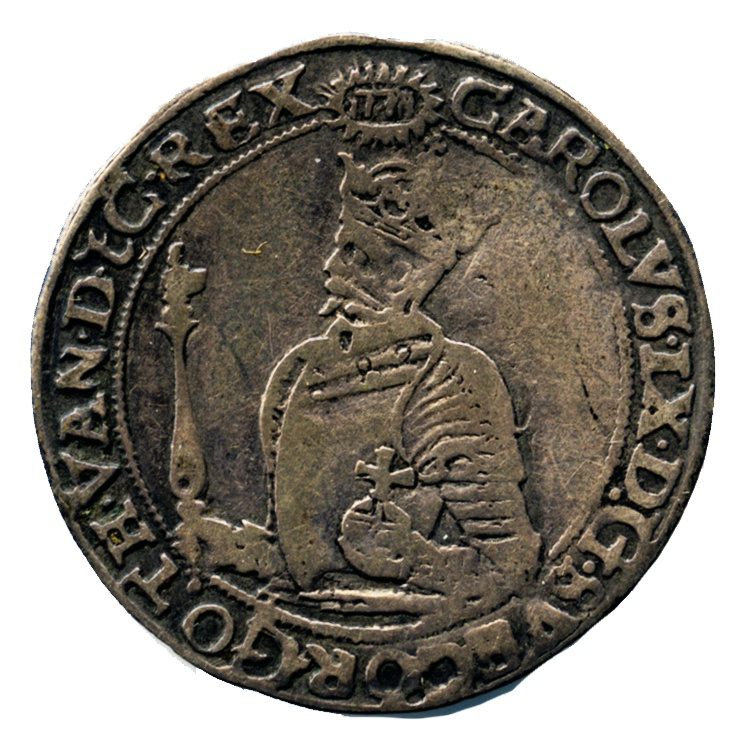
Coin from 1607 depicting Charles IX with the royal orb and scepter

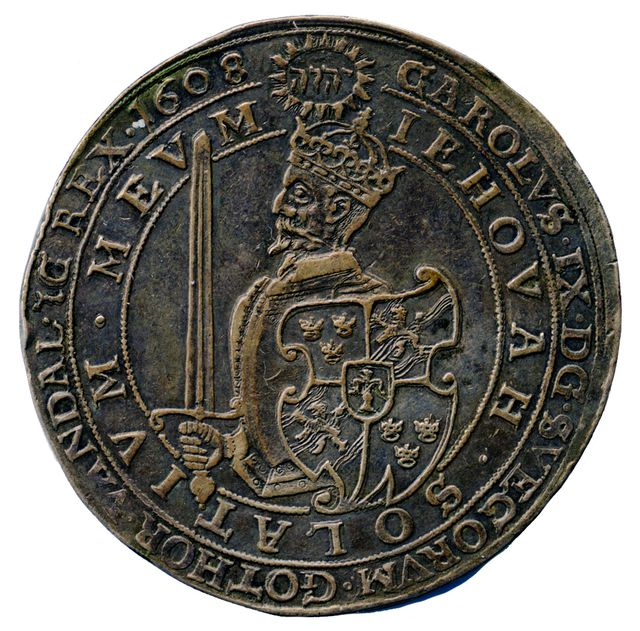
Coin from 1608, with a sword and a shield

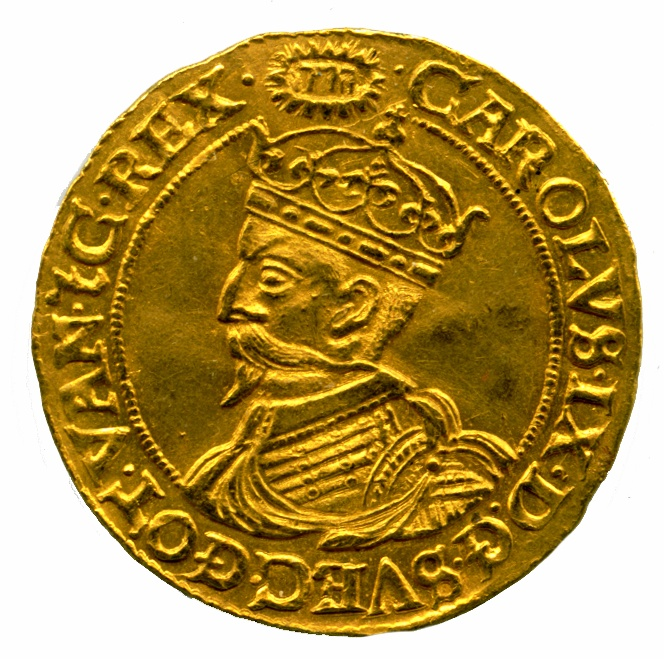
Gold coin from 1608

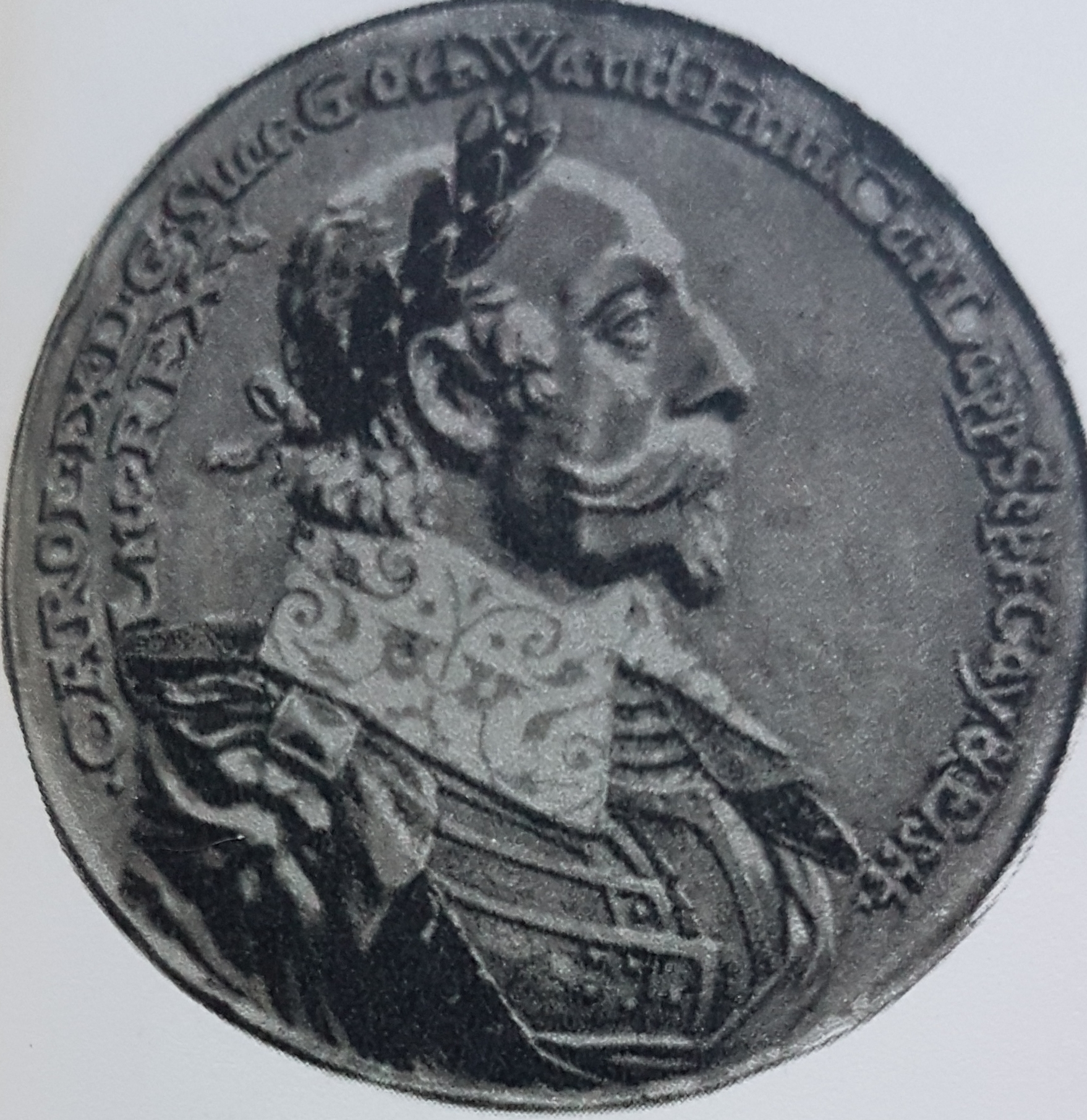
Medal of him by Ruprecht Miller, 1609

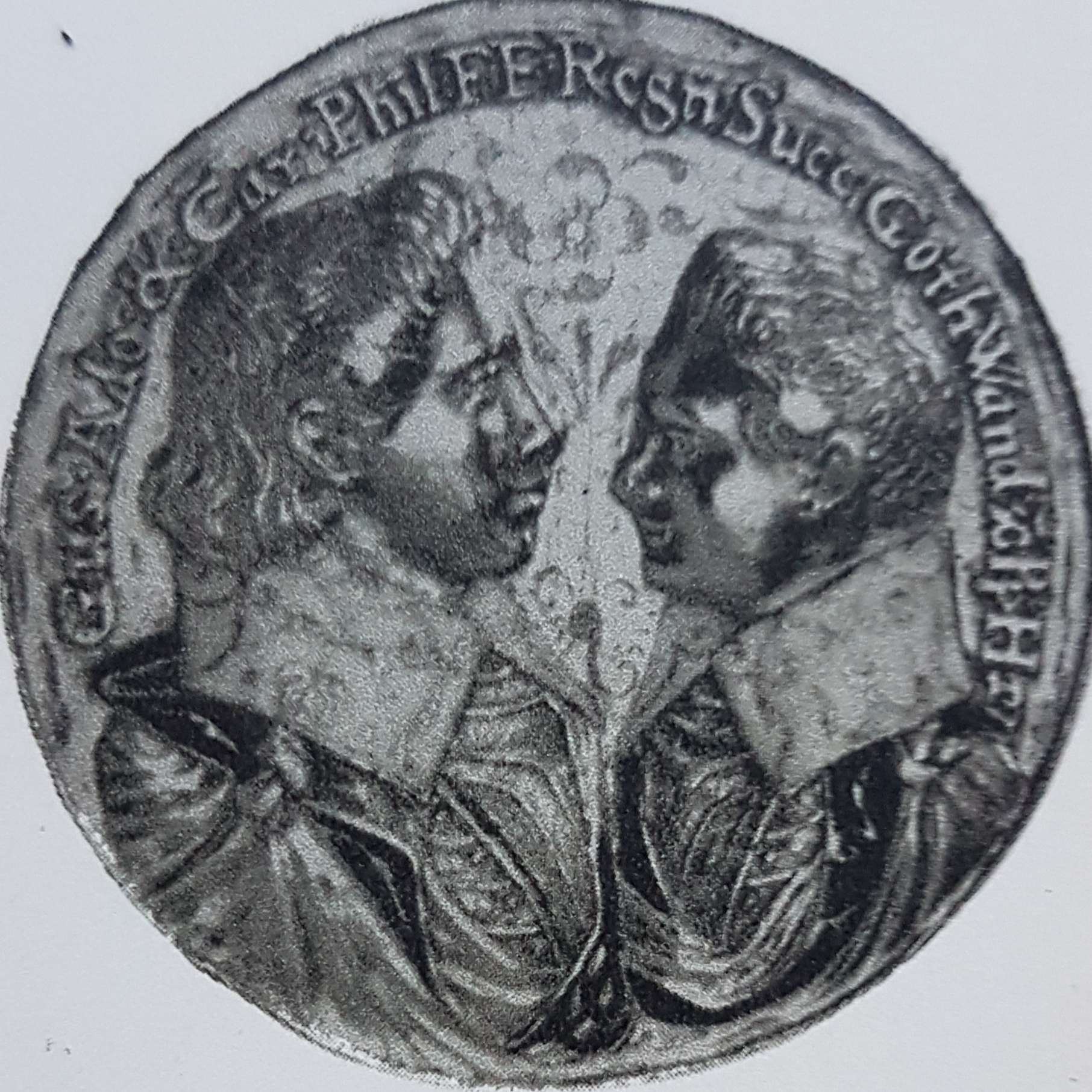
The reverse side depicting his sons Gustav Adolf and Charles Philip

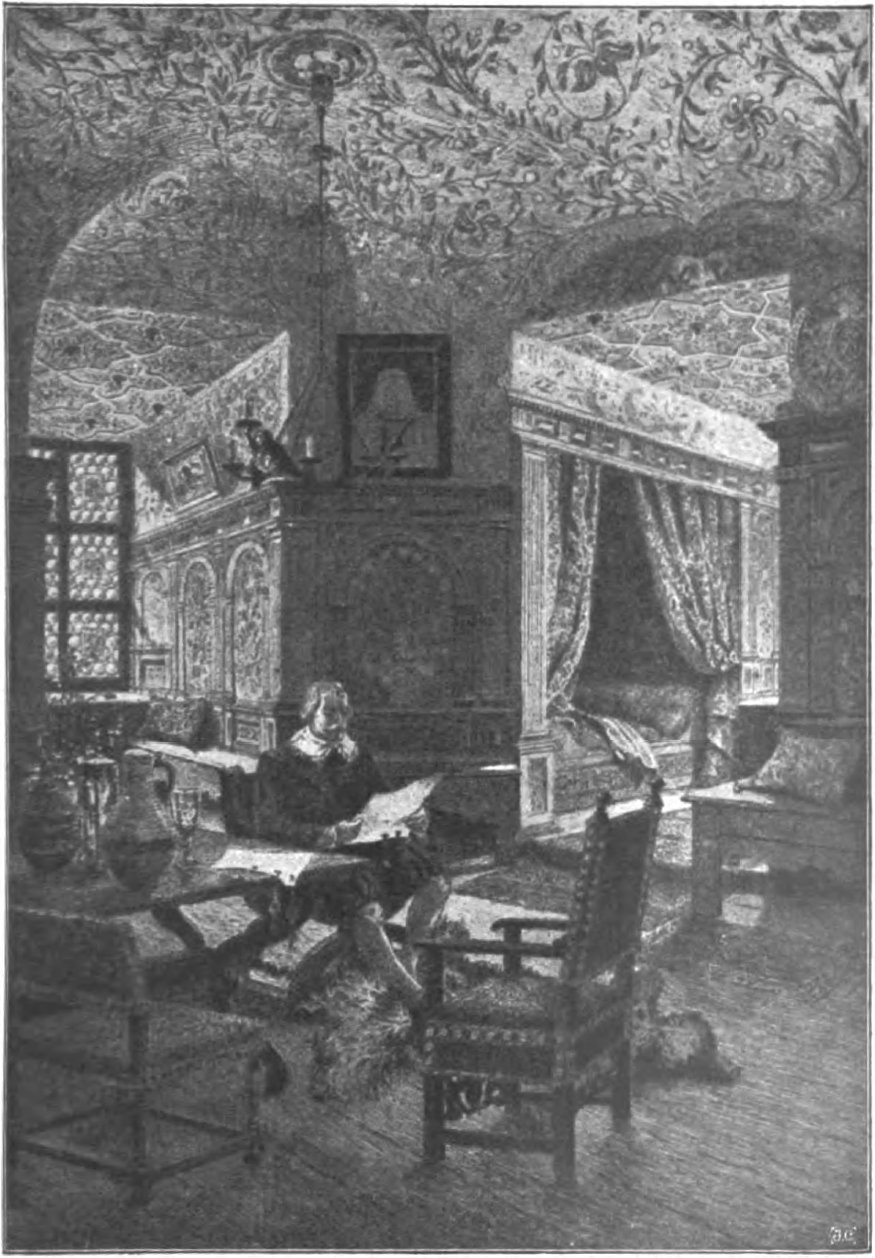
Charles in Gripsholm Castle

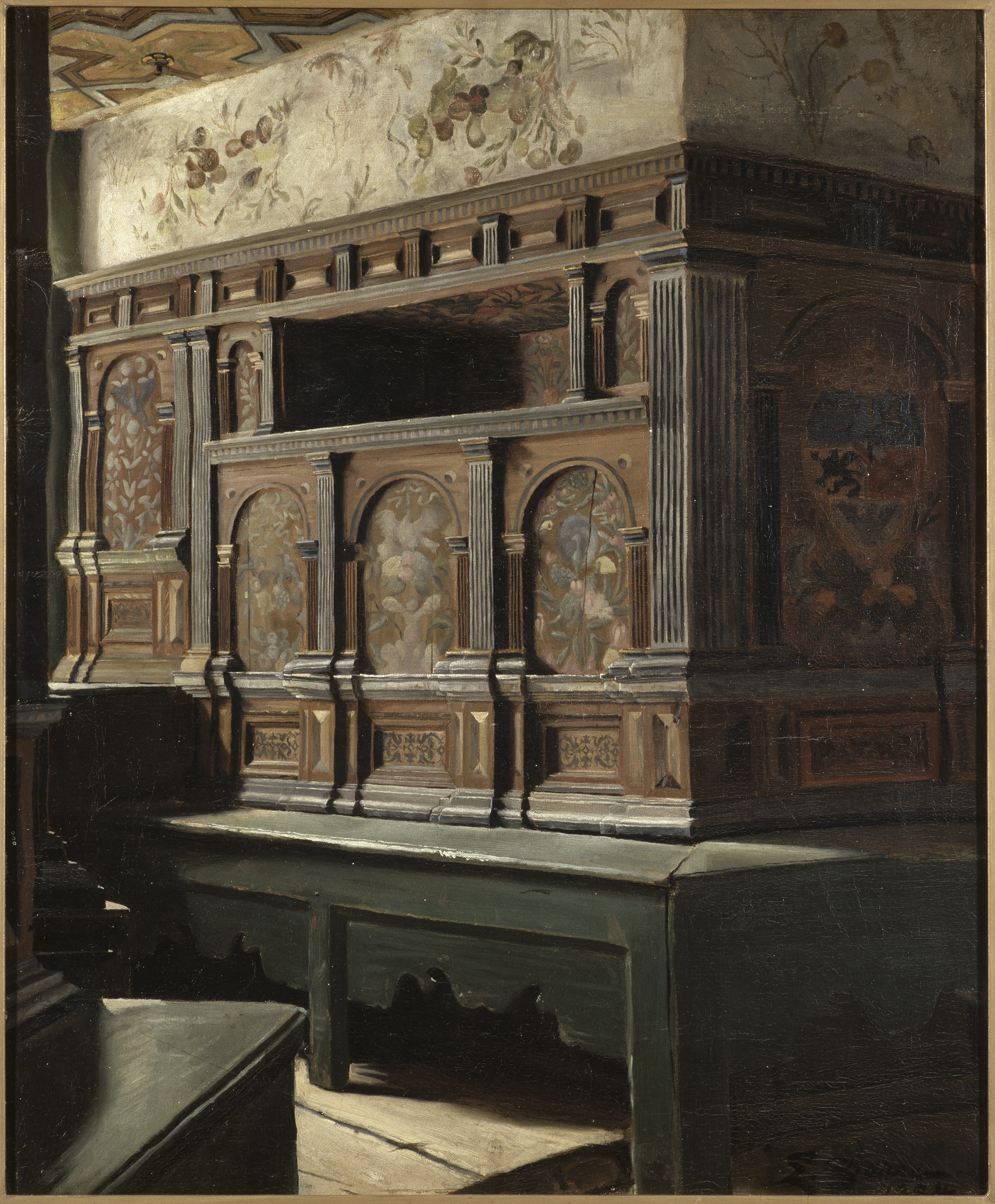
Charles IX's bedchamber at Gripsholm (Painting by Emma Sparre, 1884)

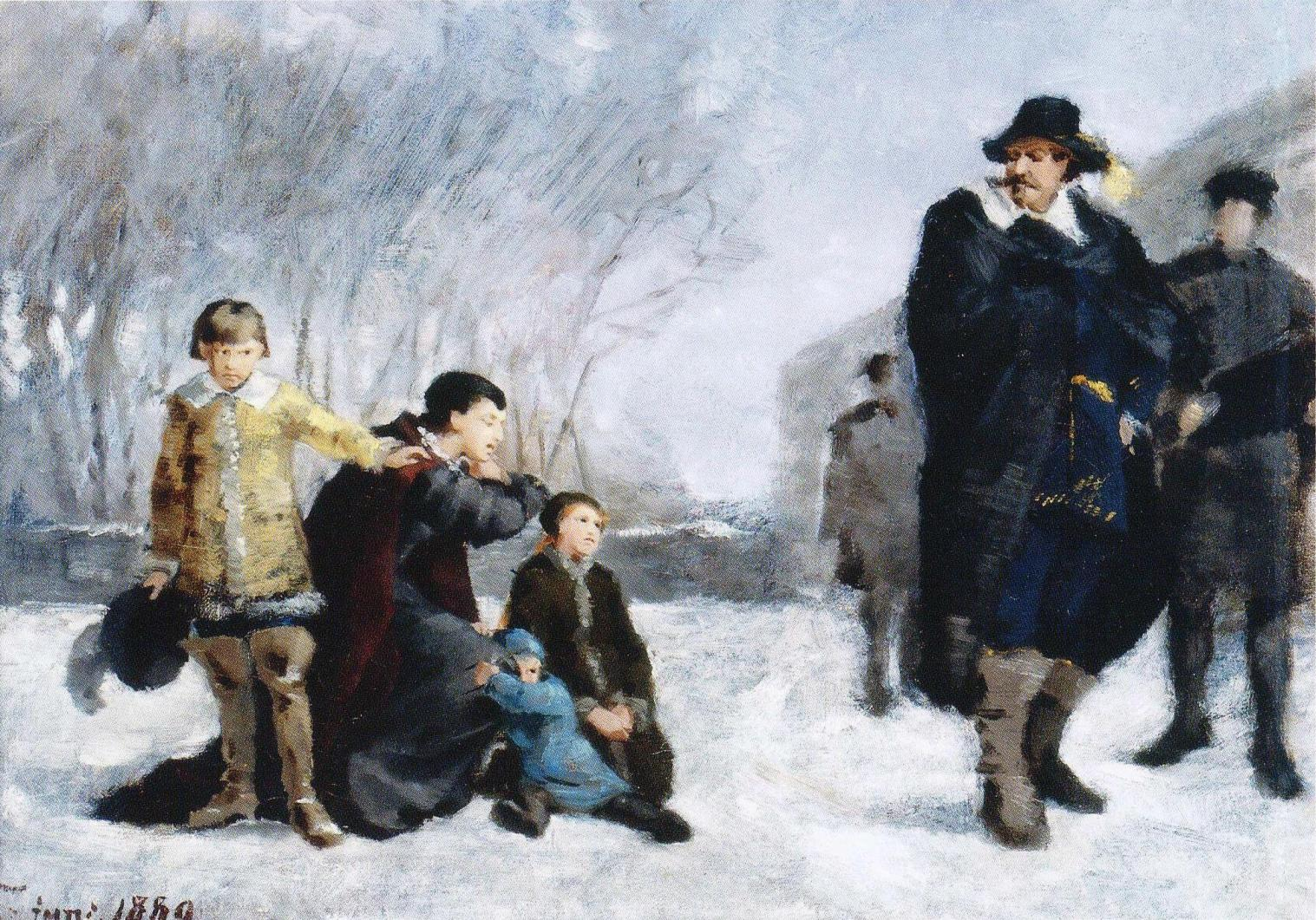
Kristina Banér Pleads for Her Husband (Painting by Helene Schjerfbeck, 1882, Charles IX on the right)

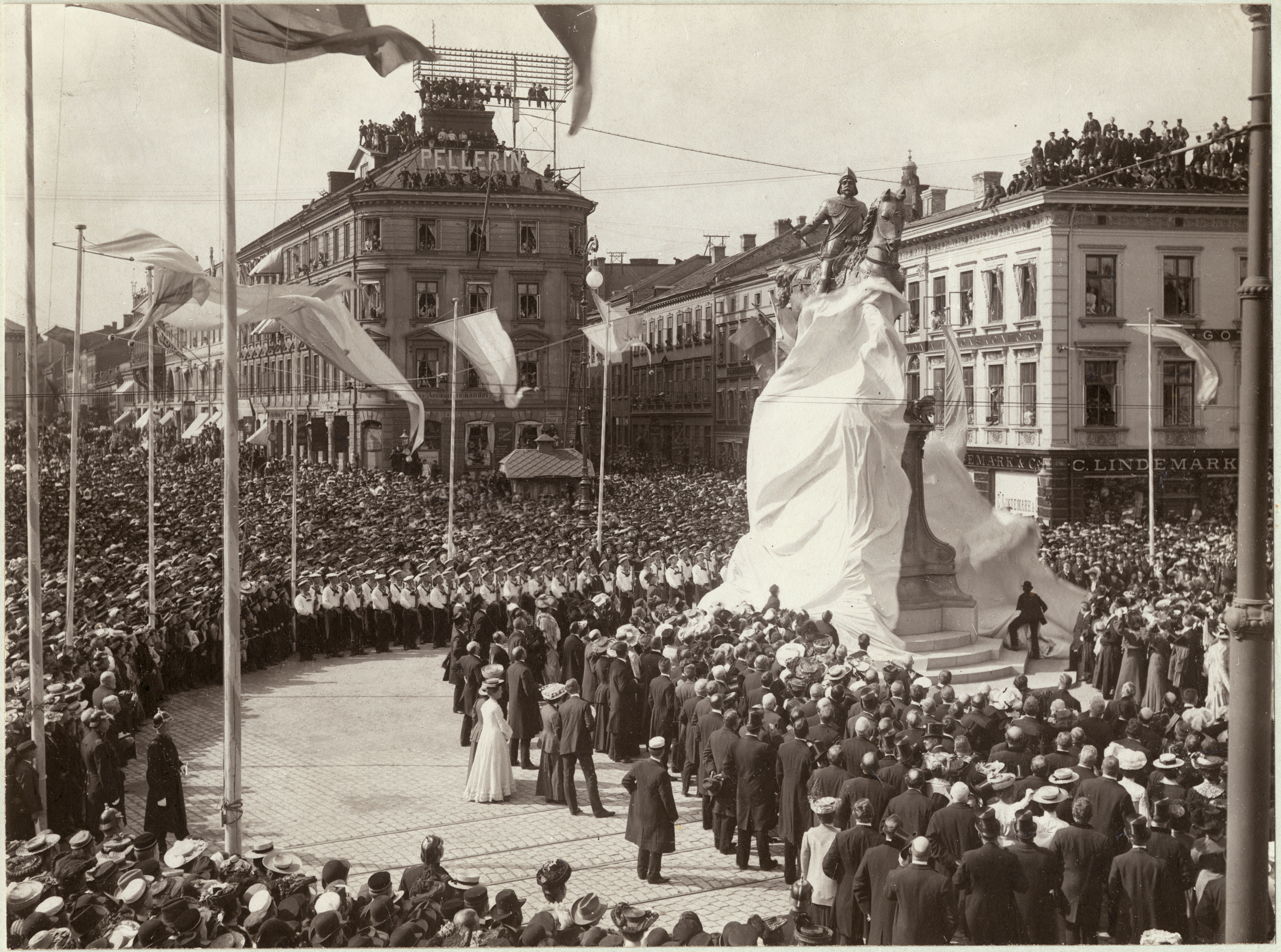
Reveal of a grand statue of him in Gothenburg, 1904

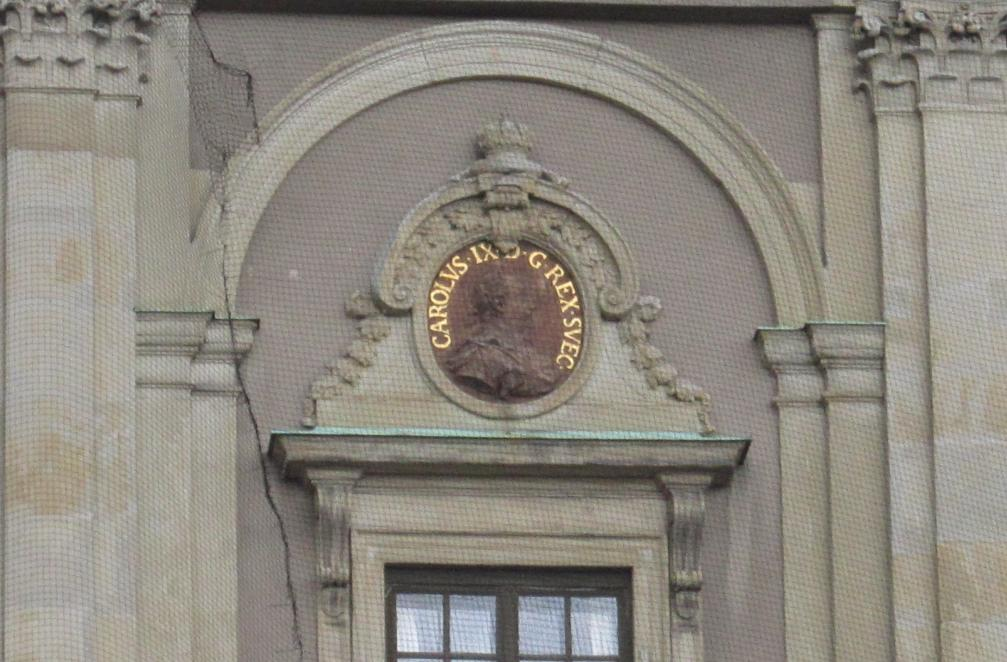
Relief on a wall of the Stockholm Palace

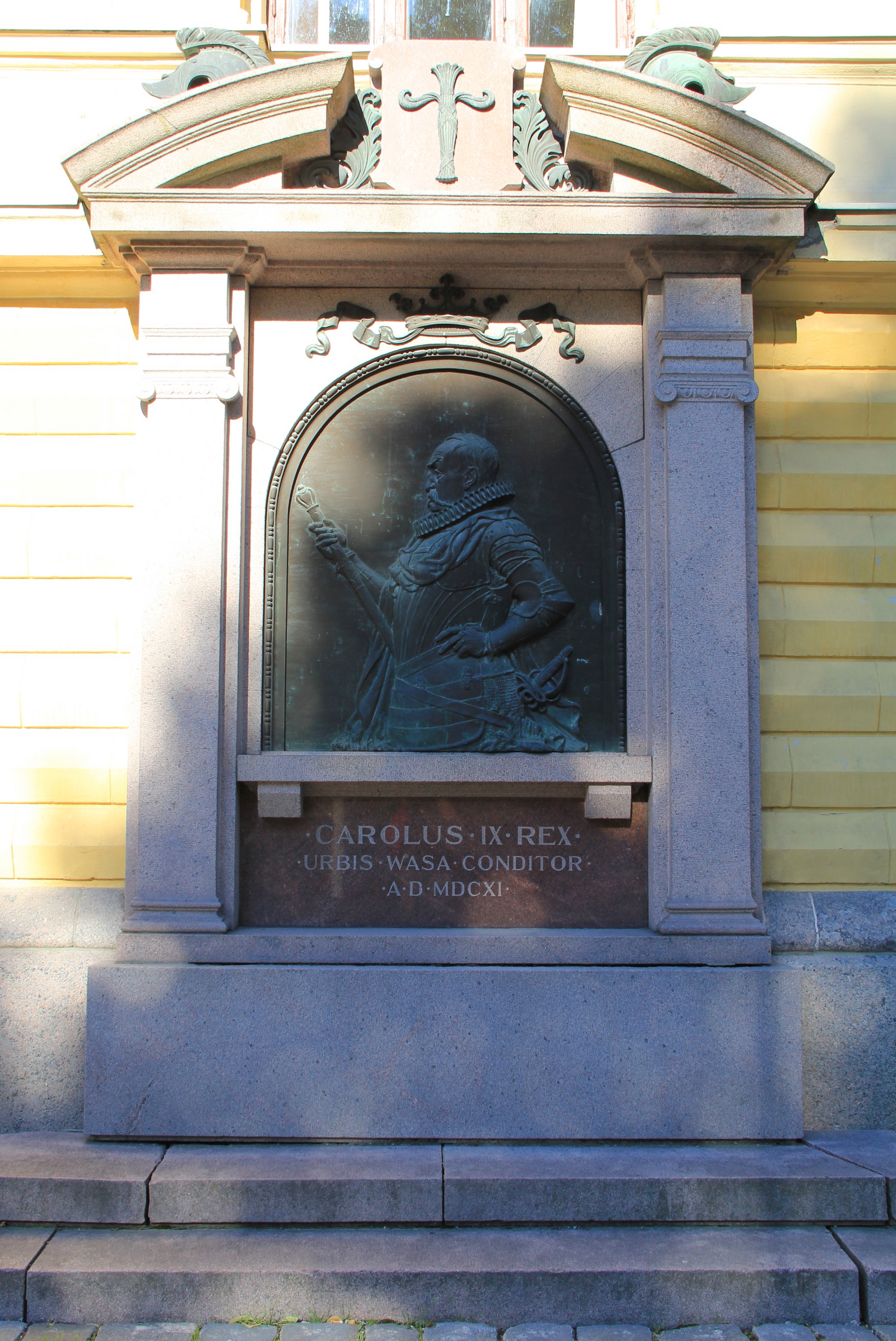
Relief in Vaasa, Finland by John Munsterhjelm, 1924

== See also ==
- History of Sweden — Rise of Sweden as a Great Power
- Battle of Kircholm
- Battle of Stångebro
- Kings of Kvenland — although his successor dropped the title, Charles claimed to be King of the Caijaners from 1607 to 1611

== Works cited ==
- Koskinen, Yrjö (1864). Klubbe-kriget samt Finlands sociala tillstånd vid slutet af sextonde århundradet [The Cudgel War and the social condition of Finland at the end of the sixteenth century] (in Swedish). Translated by Edlund, Erik Oskar. Helsinki: Finnish Literature Society.

Karl IX House of Vasa Born: 4 October 1550 Died: 30 October 1611
Regnal titles
| Vacant Title last held by Sigismund | King of Sweden; 1604–1611 | Succeeded by Gustavus Adolphus |
