= Charles Philip, Duke of Södermanland =

Swedish prince (1601–1622)

Prince Charles Philip
- Duke of Södermanland
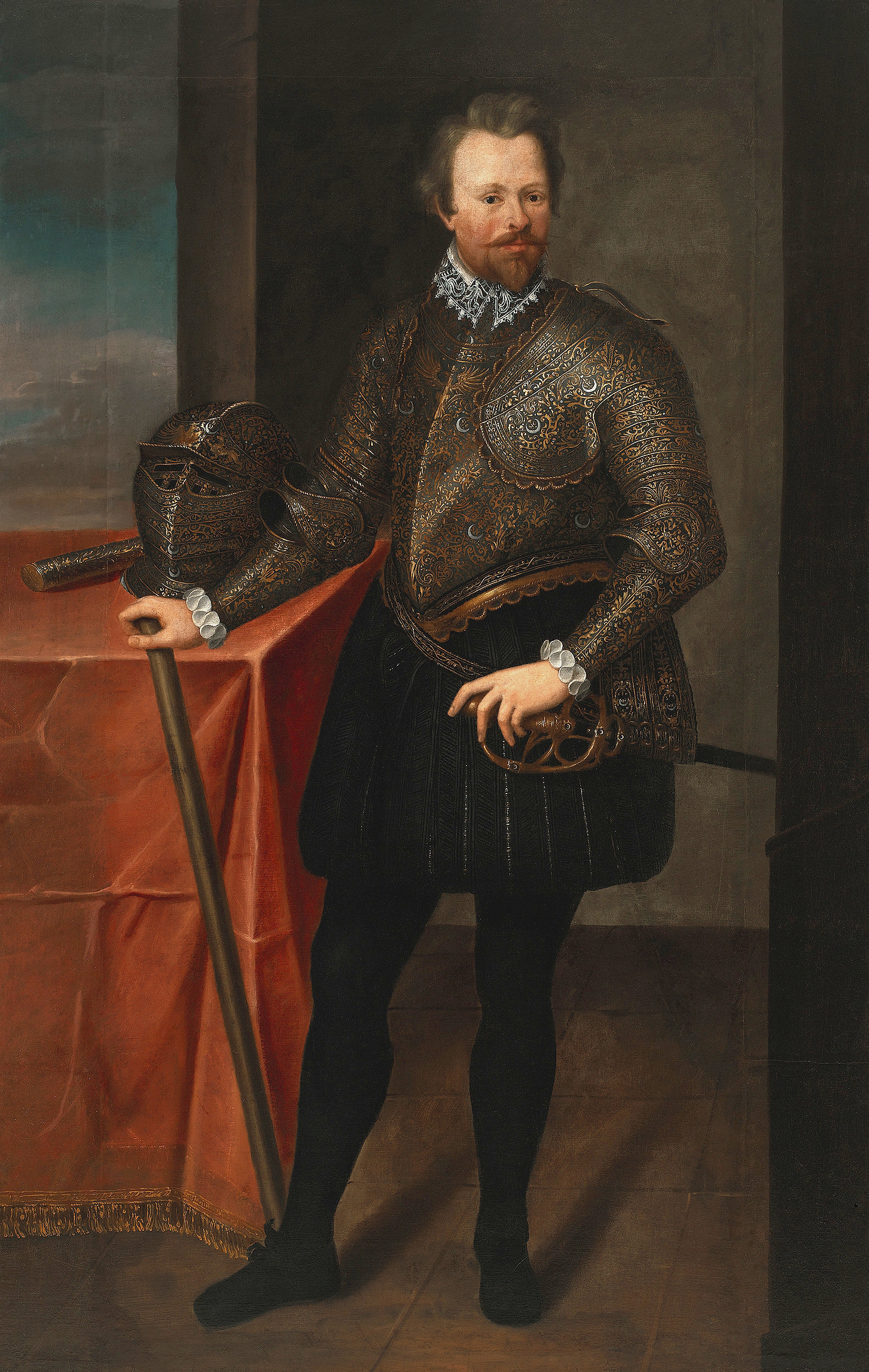
- Born: 22 April 1601; Reval, Swedish Estonia
- Died: 25 January 1622 (aged 20); Narva, Swedish Estonia
- Spouse: Elizabeth Ribbing (m. 1620) (morganatic)
- Issue: Elizabeth Gyllenhielm
- House: Vasa
- Father: Charles IX of Sweden
- Mother: Christina of Holstein-Gottorp

Prince Charles Philip of Sweden, Duke of Södermanland, (Swedish: Carl Filip; 22 April 1601 – 25 January 1622) was a Swedish prince, Duke of Södermanland, Närke and Värmland. Charles Philip was the second surviving son of King Charles IX of Sweden and his second spouse, Duchess Christina of Holstein-Gottorp.

== Biography ==
He was born at Reval Castle during his parents' visit to Swedish Estonia in 1601. His father, youngest son of King Gustav I who founded Sweden's Vasa dynasty, was Duke of Södermanland and regent of the kingdom at the time, having forced his Catholic nephew, King Sigismund, to restrict his personal rule to his other kingdom, Poland, where most of his subjects were likewise Catholic. However, in 1604, Duke Charles deposed Sigismund and donned Sweden's crown himself, assuring the nation that his branch of the Vasas would remain Protestant.

Along with his elder brother, Crown Prince Gustav Adolph, Prince Charles Philip was educated to be a staunch Lutheran under the tutelage of Johan Skytte. He was formally made duke by his father in 1609 who, however, died in 1611. His elder brother, the new King Gustavus II Adolphus felt genuine affection for him, as it was said, for his "many excellent qualities and his noble character". He was also a favourite of his mother, now queen dowager, who defended his interests against her elder son: at the coronation of 1617, she insisted his brother confirm the ducal rights in the three provinces Charles Philip held as fiefs in appanage.

In 1611, during the Time of Troubles in Russia, Jacob de la Gardie proposed Charles Philip to Novgorod and northwestern Russia as a candidate for election by the Zemsky Sobor as the next tsar. However, when his father died shortly afterward, his mother refused to let the ten-year-old boy leave for Russia, nor did his elder brother, the new king, believe the Russians were seriously considering the proposal. In 1613, Charles Philip left for Viborg, where he was to discuss the terms of the tsardom, but after Russia appointed another tsar, Michael Romanov, he returned to Sweden.

As duke of Södermanland, the appanage held by his father before becoming king, Carl Philip was expected to eventually take up residence in its capital town, Nyköping. However, during his minority, the duchy was administered by his mother and Carl Philip remained at the royal court in Stockholm. In 1617, he visited Denmark, Germany and France. He later joined the army, and accompanied his brother in 1621 as he waged war on Livonia. He distinguished himself during the siege of Riga in 1621, but later succumbed to an illness in Narva and died. It has been shown that his brother deeply mourned him.

At the time of his death in 1622, Charles Philip was the last feudal duke in Sweden. When Gustav III re-introduced the title for a royal prince in 1772, it was a mere honorary title, carrying no provincial authority.

== Family ==
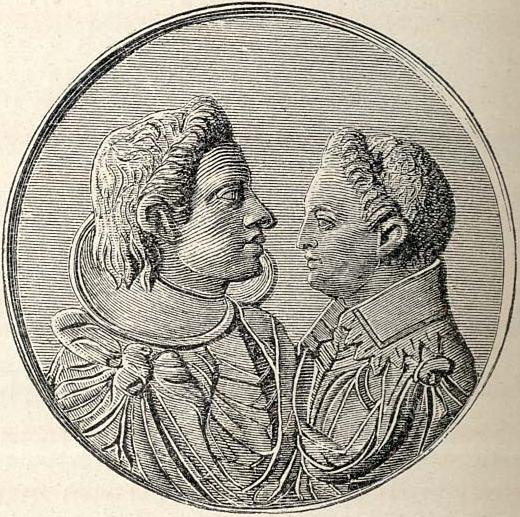
Gustav Adolph and his brother Carl Philip about 1610

On 5 May 1620 the nineteen-year-old Charles Philip married, Elizabeth Ribbing (1596–1662). Although a noblewoman (her father, Seved Svensson Ribbing, had been Sweden's first Riksskattmästare, and her mother, Anna Gyllenstierna, belonged to one of the realm's leading families), she was not of royal birth so the wedding ceremony was conducted in secret. This rendered futile any attempt to forcibly separate the couple, as had been done when the duke's elder brother was compelled to abandon his great love, Ebba Brahe, whose noble birth had likewise been deemed insufficient to allow Gustavus Adolphus to marry her. It also meant that Elisabet would never share her new husband's royal rank, the marriage being deemed morgongåvobrev.

The secret was kept until Charles Philip died soon after, fighting by his brother's side on 25 January 1622 at Narva in Livonia. The marriage was revealed when Elizabeth gave birth to her late husband's posthumous daughter, Elisabet, later that year (1622–1682). Queen Dowager Christina took mother and child into her household and acknowledged the marriage.

Although remaining untitled, the girl was accepted into the nobility, and eventually became mistress of the Queen Mother's Household (Hovmästarinna) as well as her grandmother's companion under the name "Elizabeth Gyllenhielm", that surname having become traditional for children of Vasa kings and princes born outside of dynastic marriage.

Elizabeth Gyllenhielm was heiress to the castle and manor of Tynnelsö in Södermanland and lady-in-waiting of two Swedish queens consort, Maria Eleonora of Brandenburg and Hedwig Eleonora of Holstein-Gottorp.

She was first married at the palace in Stockholm on 13 November 1645 to the nobleman, Axel Turesson Natt och Dag (1621–47), Queen Christina's chamberlain. Their son, Karl Axelsson Natt och Dag, died as a student at the University of Uppsala, having become Baron of Ijo (Friherre till Ijo).

Secondly, Elizabeth wed Baron Baltasar Marskalk, Master of the Royal Household.
