= Coronation of the Swedish monarch =

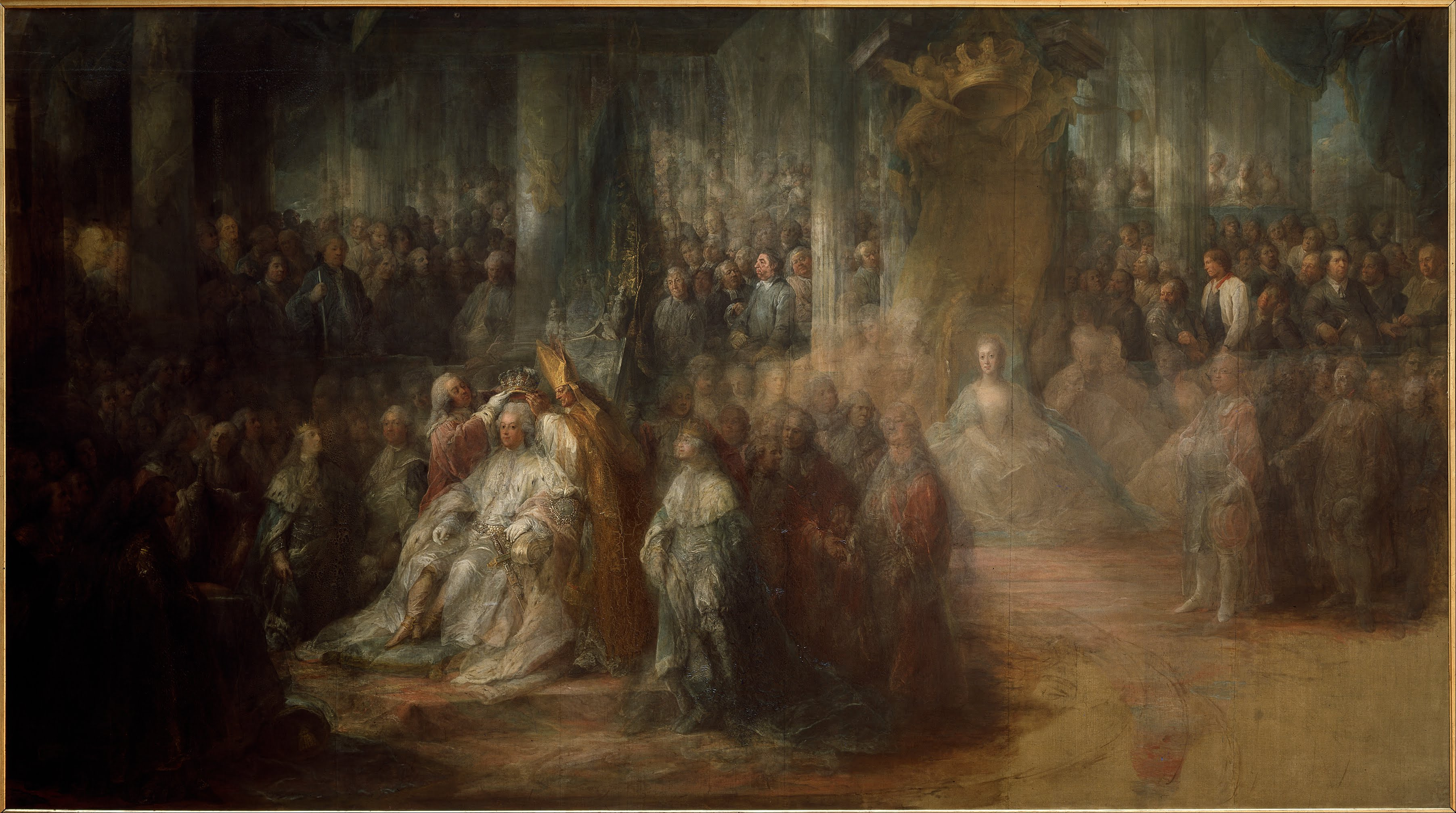
Coronation of King Gustav III

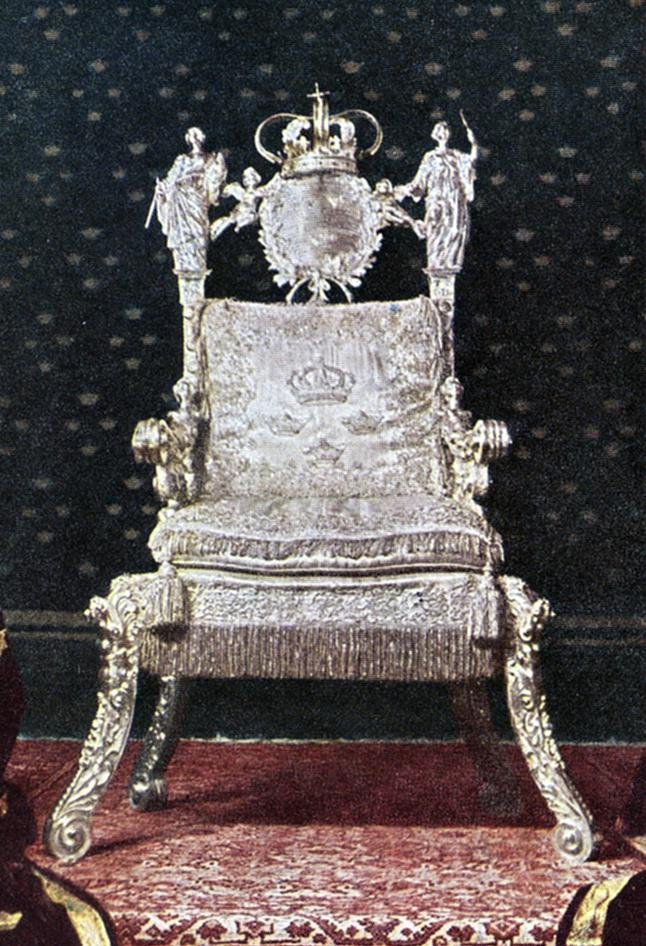
The Silver Throne, used by all Swedish monarchs from Queen Christina in 1650 onward

Swedish monarchs were crowned from 1210 until 1873 during a formal ceremony which included regal insignia. While early ceremonies in the 13th and 14th centuries were held in various cities, Uppsala Cathedral and Storkyrkan in Stockholm emerged as the primary venues from the mid-15th century onward.

== History ==
In November 1210, Eric X was the first (known) Swedish king who was crowned by Archbishop Valerius of Uppsala. All subsequent medievial Swedish kings were crowned with the exception of Eric XII and his brother Haakon VI who lack any documentation of a coronation date.

=== 19th century ceremony ===
Nineteenth-century coronations of Swedish monarchs followed a rite last used during the coronation of Oscar II in 1873:

The king and queen proceeded to the Cathedral in separate processions. The king was met at the front portal by the Archbishop of Uppsala, highest prelate in the Church of Sweden, together with other bishops in their copes. The Archbishop greeted the king: "Blessed be he who cometh in the Name of the Lord", while the Bishop of Skara said a prayer that the king might be endowed with the grace to govern his people well. The Archbishop and bishops then escorted the king to his seat on the right-hand side of the choir, with the Royal Standard on his right side and the banner of the Order of the Seraphim on his left.

The Bishop of Strängnäs and the rest of the bishops then awaited the approach of the queen; when she arrived the Bishop of Strängnäs greeted her with: "Blessed is she who cometh in the Name of the Lord", while the Bishop of Härnösand said a prayer virtually identical to the one previously said for the king. The Bishop of Strängnäs and the other bishops then escorted the queen to her seat on the left hand side of the choir where the king and queen both knelt for a few moments of private prayer while the regalia were deposited upon the altar.

The Archbishop began the service by singing: "Holy, holy, holy, Lord God of Sabaoth", the normal beginning of the Swedish High Mass. The Bishop of Skara recited the Creed before the altar and the hymn "Come, thou Holy Spirit, come" was sung. The Litany and then an anthem were sung during which the king went to his throne on a dais before the altar with the Royal Standard being borne on his right and the banner of the Order of the Seraphim on his left. Following this, the Regalia were brought forward. The king's mantle and Crown Prince's coronet were removed and placed on the altar, and the kneeling king was vested in the Royal Mantle by a state minister while the Archbishop read the first chapter of the Gospel of St. John. The Minister for Justice recited the oath to the king, which he took while laying three fingers on the Bible.

Following this, the Archbishop anointed the king on his forehead, breast, temples and wrists, saying:

The Almighty everlasting God pour out His Holy Spirit into your soul and mind, plans and undertakings, by whose gift may you so rule land and kingdom as to redound to the honour and glory of God, maintain justice and equity and be for the good of the land and people.

The king then rose and resumed his seat on his throne, where the Archbishop and the Minister of Justice crowned him conjointly, the Archbishop praying a prepared prayer that the king's reign might be good and prosperous.

The king was then invested with the Sceptre by Archbishop and the Minister for Foreign Affairs, while the Orb was given him by Count Hamilton, the Archbishop reading set prayers for both of these events. A Key was then delivered to the king by the Major-General of Nordin, as the Archbishop said the following prayer:

God the Almighty who of His divine providence hath raised you to this royal dignity, grant you to unlock treasures of wisdom and truth for your people, to lock out error, vices and sloth from your kingdom and to provide for the industrious prosperity and increase, relief and comfort for the suffering and afflicted.

The unsheathed coronation sword was then placed in the king's hand as the Archbishop said a prayer that the king might use his power well and justly. The Archbishop returned to the altar. With the king seated on his throne, crowned and bearing the Sceptre in his right hand and the Orb in his left, the State Herald standing behind the throne now cried out:

Now has (name) been crowned king over the lands of Swedes, the Goths and the Wends. He and no other.

A hymn was then sung, following which the Archbishop said a prayer and gave the king his blessing.

As a second anthem was sung, the queen now left her seat in the choir and proceeded to her throne on the dais before the altar. She knelt, was invested in her Royal Mantle, anointed by the Archbishop on her forehead and wrists, and crowned by the Archbishop. Taking her seat on her throne, she was next invested with her Sceptre and Orb, the Archbishop using the forms used for the king, but appropriately adapted for the queen. Then the State Herald, standing behind her throne, proclaimed her queen and the choir sung "Prosperity to the Queen", followed by the singing of a hymn. The Archbishop next said a prayer similar to the one he said for the king and gave the queen his blessing.

Homage was now done, following which the procession left the cathedral during the singing of the hymn, "Now thank we all our God".

=== Modern ceremony ===
Following the coronation of Oscar II in 1873, subsequent kings of Sweden elected not to be crowned, though there is no law or constitutional provision preventing a coronation. The current monarch, Carl XVI Gustaf, simply took the then-required regal assurance (Swedish: Konungaförsäkran) during a meeting of the cabinet and, afterwards, was enthroned in a simple ceremony at the throne room of the Royal Palace in Stockholm on 19 September 1973. The Regalia of Sweden were displayed on cushions to the right and left of the royal throne, but were never given to the king. Carl Gustaf made an accession speech, which comprised the main purpose of the undertaking.

== Historical list of coronations ==
=== Coronations ===
Date	Site	Picture	Name	Reign
11 May 1818	Storkyrkan		Charles XIV John	5 February 1818 – 8 March 1844
28 September 1844	Stockholm		Oscar I	8 March 1844 – 8 July 1859
3 May 1860	Stockholm		Charles XV	8 July 1859 – 18 September 1872
12 May 1873	Storkyrkan		Oscar II	18 September 1872 – 8 December 1907

=== Enthronement ===
Date	Site	Picture	Name	Reign
8 December 1907	Stockholm Palace		Gustaf V	8 December 1907 – 29 October 1950
30 October 1950	Stockholm Palace		Gustaf VI Adolf	29 October 1950 – 15 September 1973
19 September 1973	Stockholm Palace		Carl XVI Gustaf	15 September 1973 – present

== See also ==
- List of monarchs of Sweden
- Monarchy of Sweden
- Regalia of Sweden
- Silver Throne
- Swedish coronation robes
