= Mantle and pavilion (heraldry) =

Heraldic element

Mantle with a pavilion on top

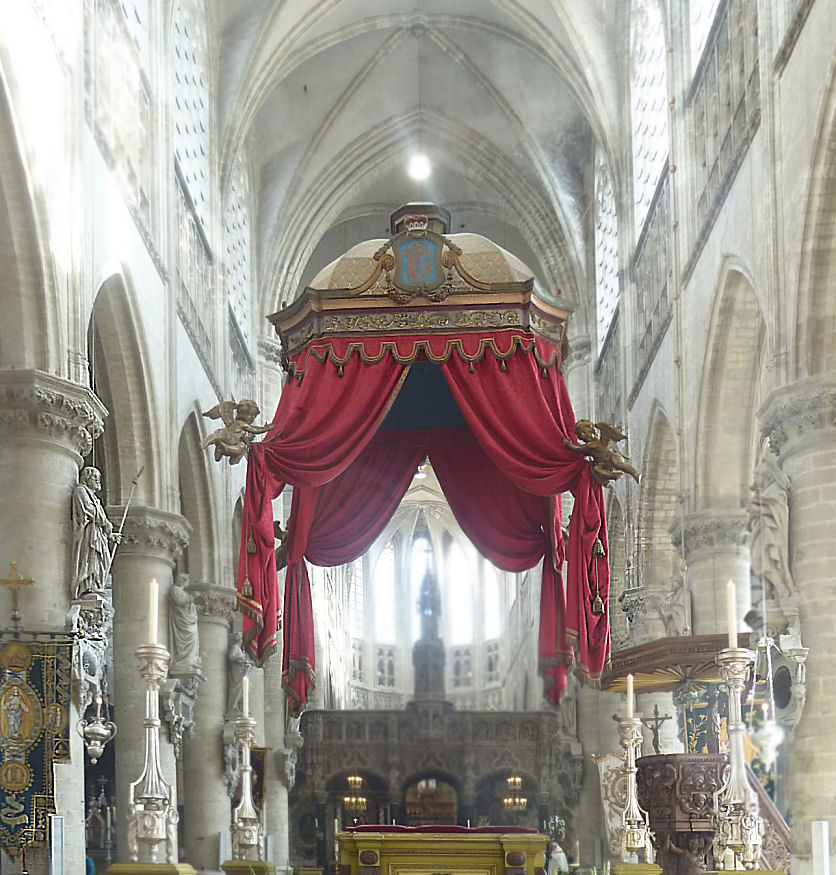
Free-hanging baldachin as a ciborium over the altar of Saint Gummarus in Lier

In heraldry, a mantle is a symbol of sovereign power and is generally reserved for royalty. In some cases, its use has also been granted to other nobles, in recognition of particular merits. In ordinary rendering, the mantle is usually crimson and lined with ermine.

Certain coats of arms may also display a pavilion (similar to a baldachin) surmounting the mantle. The pavilion is said to be the invention of the Frenchman Philip Moreau. Some republics have displayed a mantle and pavillon in their coats of arms, contemporarily Serbia.

While common in continental European heraldry, the mantle and pavilion is not found in English or Scottish heraldry, except for the mantle of a Scottish feudal baron.

Mantle and pavilion should not be confused with mantling.

== Gallery ==
=== Mantles ===
==== Royal mantles ====
Coat of arms of the King of the Netherlands, with a mantle and pavilion

Greater arms of Sweden, featuring a purple mantle but with no pavilion

King Carl XVI Gustaf of Sweden's former arms as crown prince, with a blue mantle reflecting the Swedish princely mantle

Royal Arms of the Kingdom of Denmark

Coat of arms of the King of the Belgians

Coat of arms of Belgium

=== Polish-Lithuanian Commonwealth ===
==== Non-royal mantles ====
Coat of arms of the House of Montmorency, from the era of the Bourbon Restoration, with a blue mantle and ducal coronet

Coat of arms of the Prince of Lichenstein, with a purple princely mantle

Coat of arms of the House of Gonzaga

Coat of arms of the Princes Sułkowski, a Polish princely family

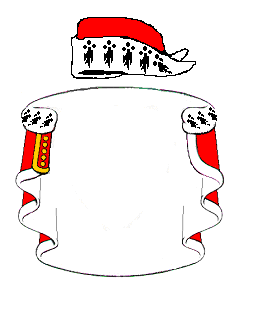
Historical mantle and chapeau of a Scottish feudal baron

Mantle and coronet of a Grandee of Spain

Mantle and princely hat of a Russian prince

==== Mantles of chivalric orders ====
Spanish monarch's arms with the mantle of the Order of Charles III
(until 1931)

Arms of Maximilian von Fürstenberg with the mantle of the Order of the Holy Sepulchre

Arms of the Sovereign Military Order of Malta

Arms of the Order of Saint Lazarus

=== Mantles with pavilions ===
Grand coat of arms of the Kingdom of France

Greater coat of arms of the Russian Empire

Coat of arms of the Karađorđević dynasty

Greater coat of arms of Serbia

== See also ==
- Robe
