= Royal Armoury =

Royal Armoury may refer to:

- Livrustkammaren ("The Royal Armoury"), a museum in the Royal Palace in Stockholm
- Royal Armouries, the United Kingdom's National Museum of Arms and Armour
- Royal Armouries Museum, in Leeds
