= Crown of Erik XIV =

Official crown of the king of Sweden

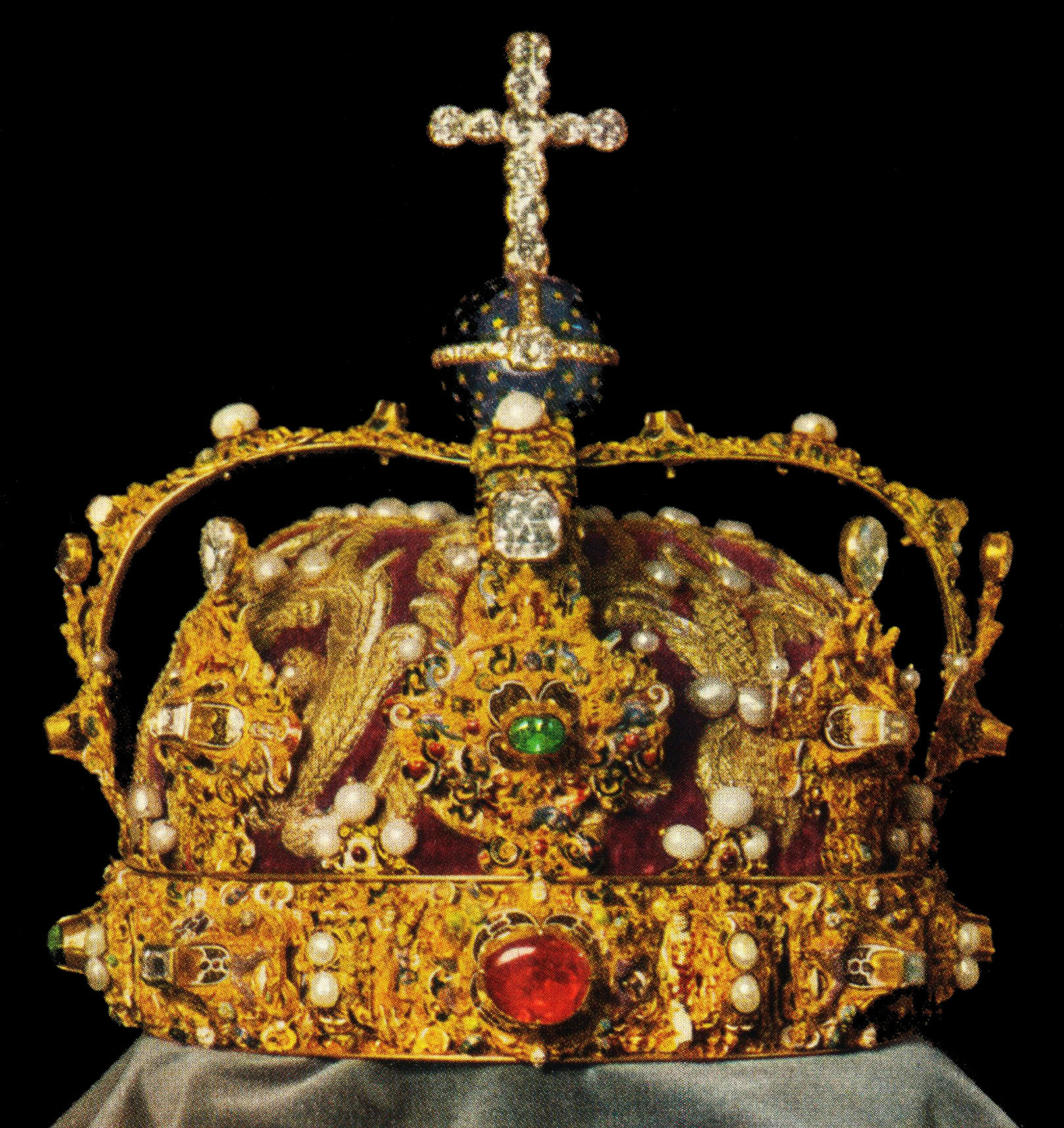
- The crown of King Erik XIV (before 1970).

Details
- Country: Sweden
- Made: 1561
- Arches: 4
- Material: Gold
- Cap: Velvet
- Notable stones: Pearls, rubies, emeralds, diamonds

The Crown of King Erik XIV (Swedish: Erik XIV:s krona), often simply known as the king's crown (kungakronan), is a royal crown of Sweden. It was made in Stockholm in 1561 by the Flemish goldsmith Cornelius ver Weiden, for the coronation of King Erik XIV. It is kept in the Treasury beneath Stockholm Palace, together with the rest of the Swedish Royal Regalia. The Treasury is open to the public as a museum.

The crown is the official crown of the King of Sweden, and is still used in ceremonies.

The crown consists of a circlet with four larger leaves alternating with four smaller leaves. Behind the larger leaves, four hoops extend in a cross over the crown and at the top is a monde with an enamel cross. Between the eight main leaves are even smaller leaves decorated with three pearls each.

The entire crown is decorated with pearls and gemstones, including rubies, emeralds, and diamonds. Most of the work was originally done in a style that is typical of the Renaissance, but it was partly changed later. However, most of the crown has been restored today. One addition - which still remains after recent restorations - is the eight diamonds that are located at the top of each of the eight leaves. They were installed in 1818.

In the nineteenth century, King Charles XIV John had the original gold monde and cross replaced with a larger blue monde adorned with diamonds, accompanied by a more brilliant cross on top. The gold monde suited the crown better; the blue monde spoilt the symmetry of the crown, as it seemed slightly larger.

In about 1970 the original monde and cross were reinstated, and a cap within the crown made in 1778 of beaded gold embroidery was replaced by a dark red velvet cap to restore its original appearance. The blue monde (with its cross) is now displayed next to the crown in the Treasury.

== See also ==
- Swedish Crown
