= Livrustkammaren =

Swedish state historical museum with exhibits of Swedish military history

The Royal Armoury
- Livrustkammaren

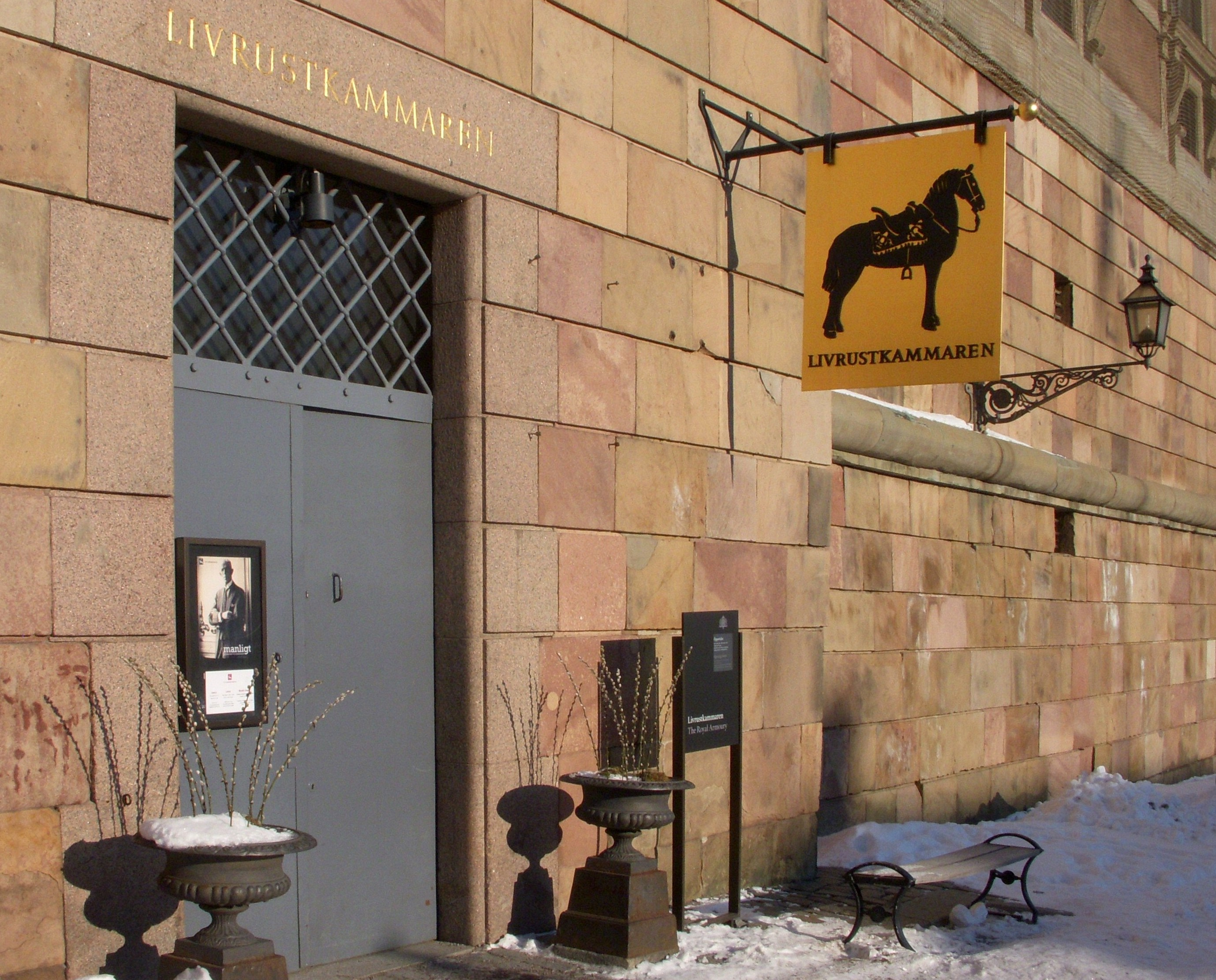
- Entrance to the museum
- Interactive fullscreen map
- Established: 1628
- Location: Slottsbacken, Stockholm, Sweden
- Coordinates: 59°19′36″N 18°04′23″E
- Website: livrustkammaren.se

The Royal Armoury (Swedish: Livrustkammaren) is a museum in the Royal Palace in Stockholm, Sweden. It contains many artifacts of Swedish military history and Swedish royalty. It is the oldest museum in Sweden, established in 1628 by King Gustavus Adolphus when he decided that his clothes from his campaign in Poland should be preserved for posterity.

A drinking horn made from a horn of the last aurochs bull and taken by the Swedish army as war booty from Jaktorów, Poland, during the Swedish invasion of Poland (1655–1660) is part of the collection of the museum.

== History ==
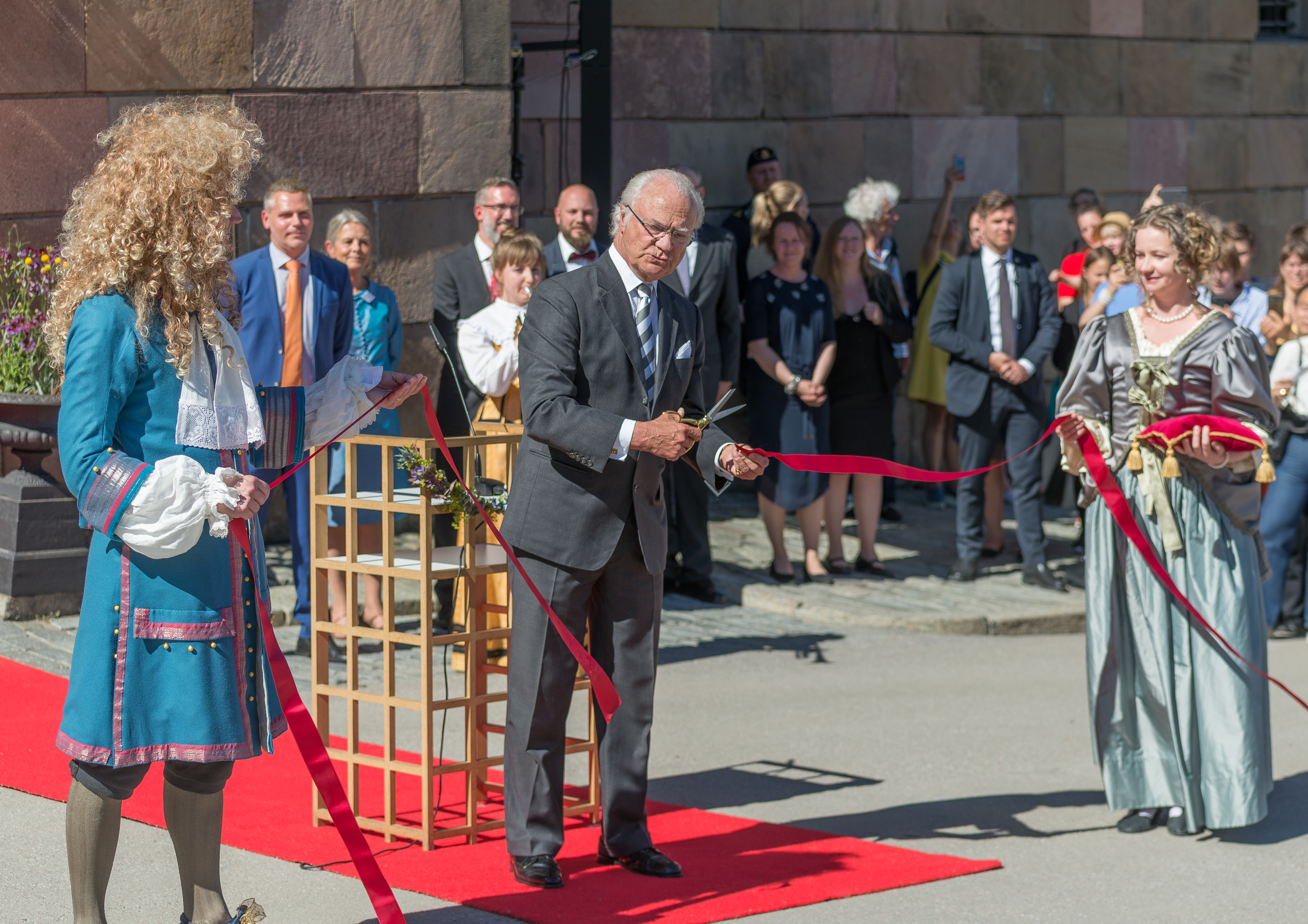
King Carl XVI Gustaf inaugurating the re-opened Livrustkammaren in 2019.

The Royal Armoury (Livrustkammaren) is the oldest museum in Sweden. Its origins trace back to the 16th century as a functional armory used by Vasa dynasty monarchs to store personal weapons, armor, and garments.

The blood-stained shirt worn by Gustavus Adolphus in 1627 during the campaign against Poland.

The institution was officially established in 1628 by King Gustavus Adolphus. Following his campaign in Poland, the king ordered that his blood-stained clothes from battle be preserved "for eternal memory" (Latin: in perpetuam rei memoriam). This decree turned the royal arsenal into a historical repository, establishing a tradition of preserving items associated with key moments in Swedish royal history. Over the 17th and 18th centuries, the museum's collection grew significantly to include coronation robes, royal carriages, ceremonial attire, and funeral regalia, such as those of King Charles IX and Queen Christina.

The collection was relocated several times during the 19th and 20th centuries:

- In 1865, the exhibits were moved from the Stockholm Palace to the newly constructed Nationalmuseum.
- In 1906, the collection was transferred to the Nordic Museum on Djurgården.
- In 1978, Livrustkammaren returned to its historical home in the cellar vaults of the Stockholm Palace, where it remains open to the public today.

== Gallery ==
Burgundian helmet with a mask visor of King Gustav Vasa, crafted c. 1540

Gustav Vasa's helmet, 1540

Helmet of King Erik XIV and a flanged mace

Parade armour and tack made for King Erik XIV, crafted by Eliseus Libaerts after designs by Étienne Delaune, c. 1562

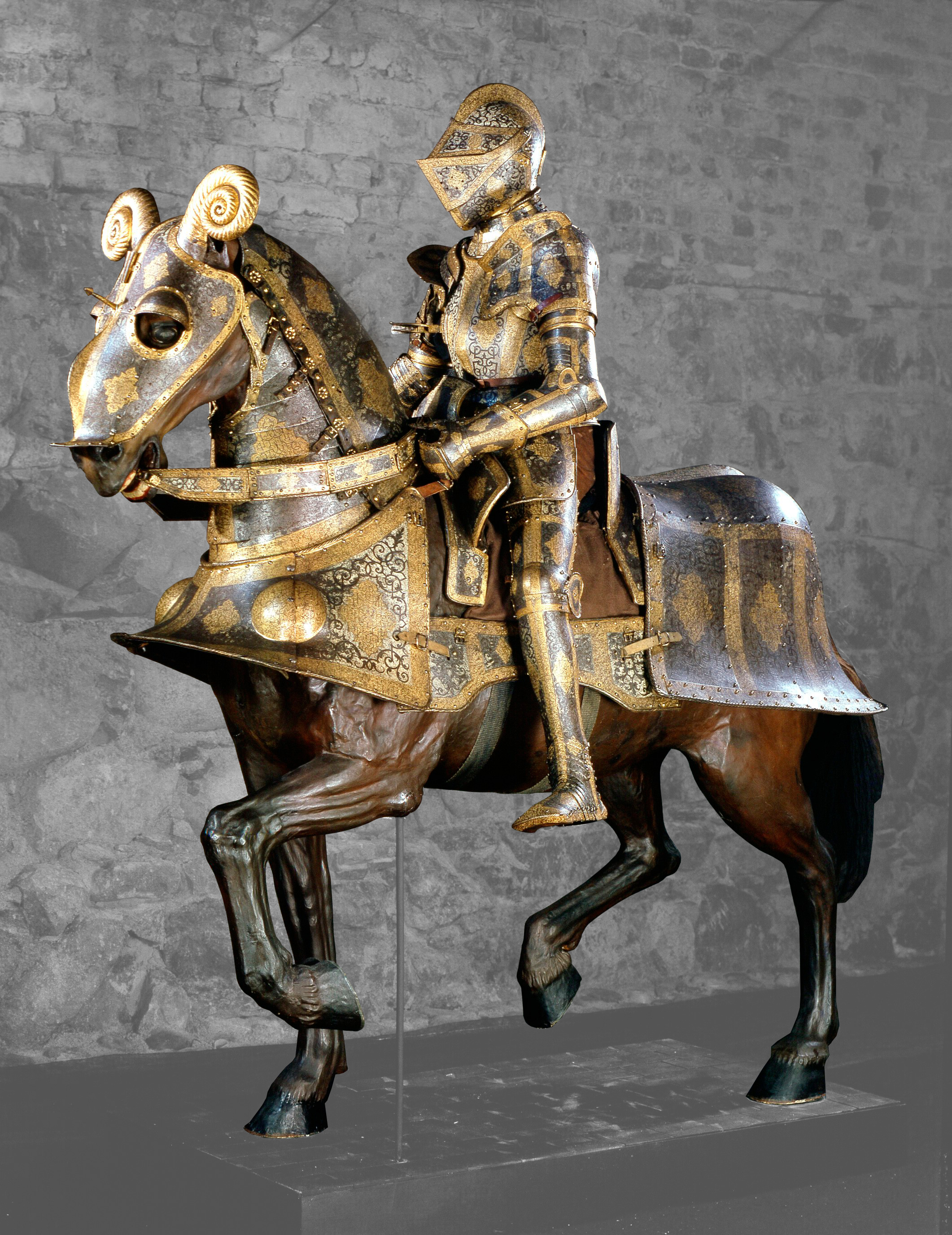
Parade armour for horse and rider of King Sigismund II Augustus

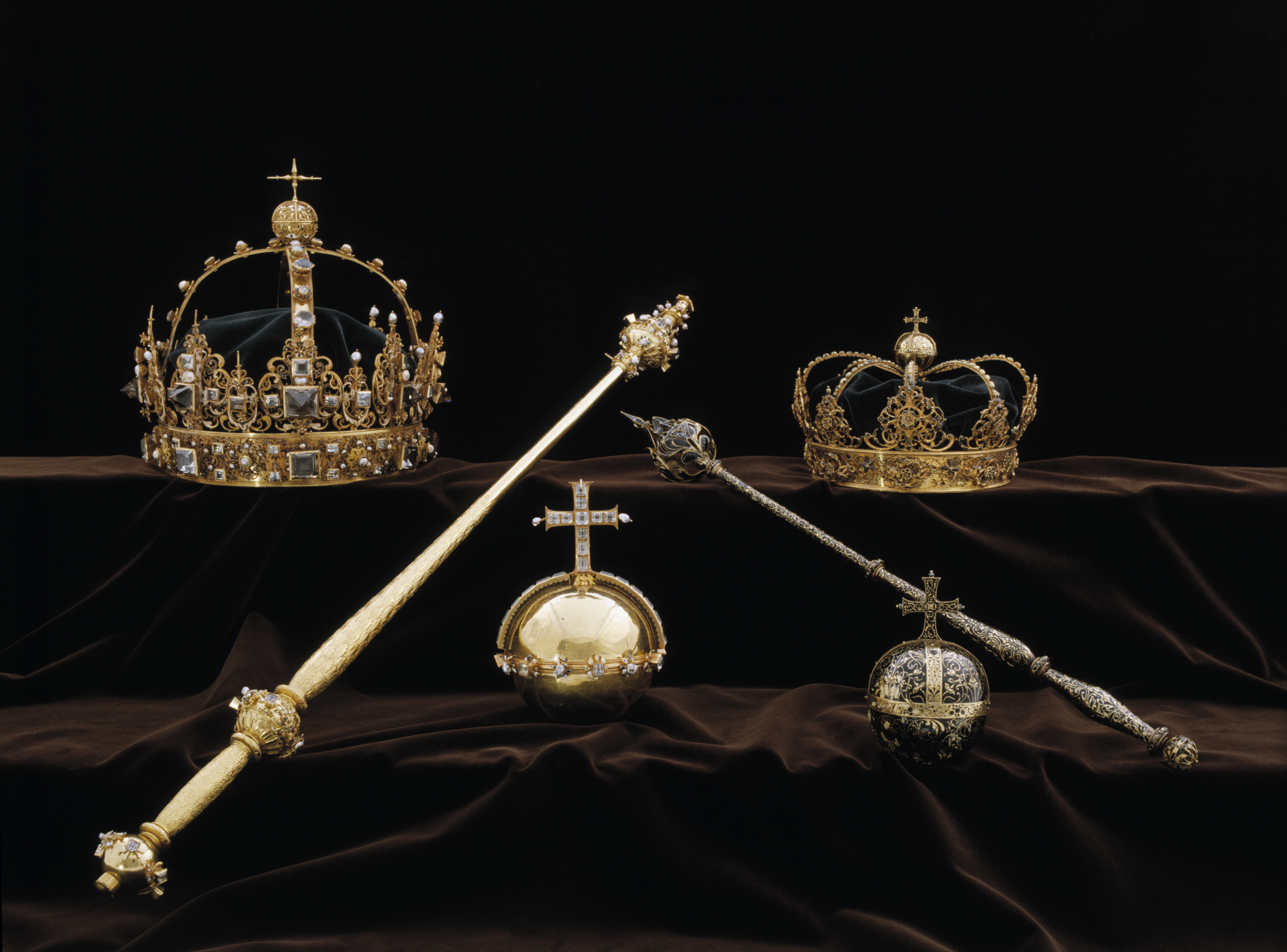
King Charles IX's and Queen Christina's 17th-century funeral regalia were stolen from Strängnäs Cathedral in a daring daytime speedboat heist on July 31, 2018, and later recovered

The gilded ceremonial armor of King Charles X Gustav was crafted for his 1660 funeral procession

Burial Regalia of King Charles X Gustav

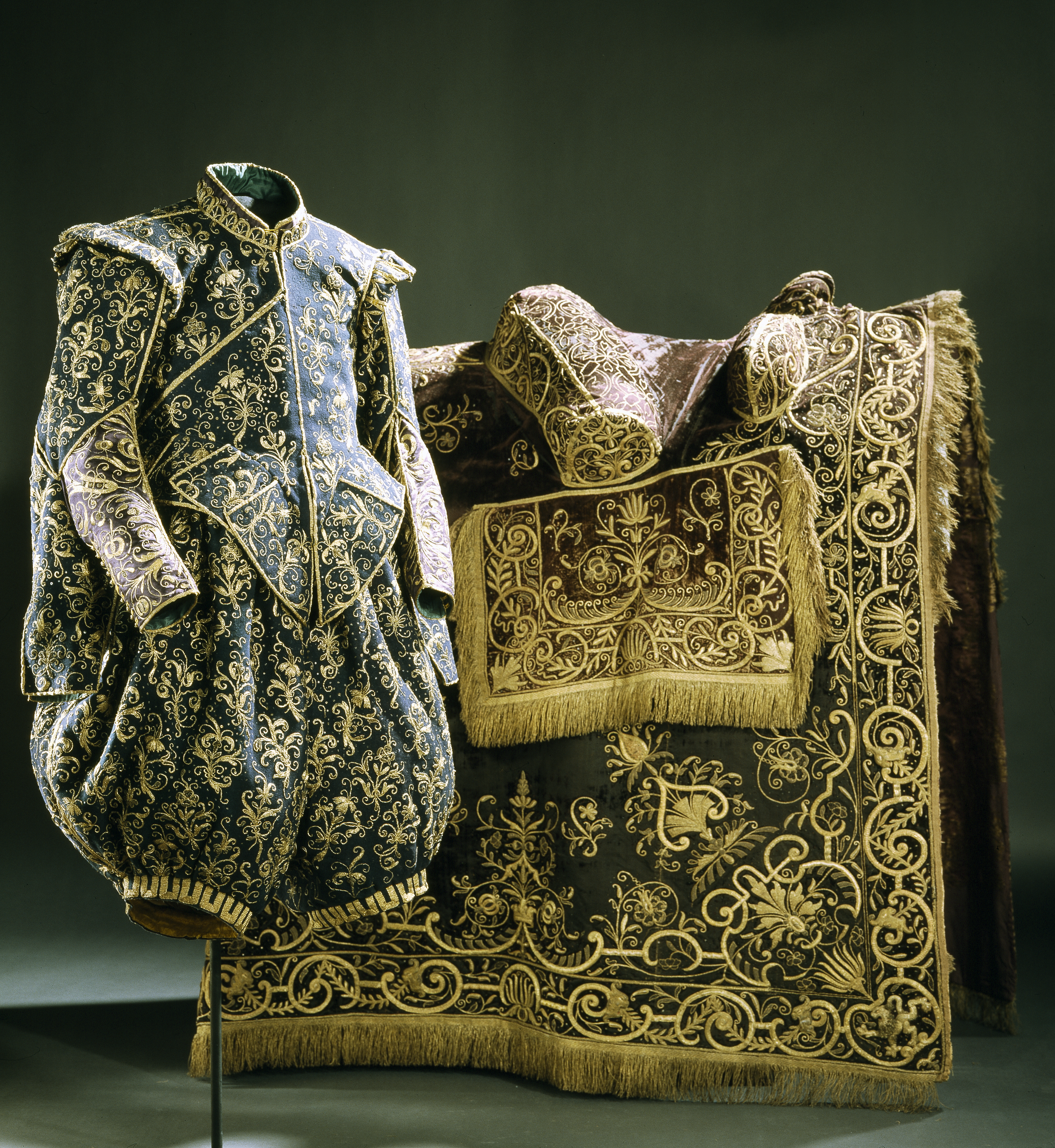
The wedding suit and saddle of King Gustavus Adolphus

Streiff, the royal warhorse of Gustavus Adolphus, which was taxidermied and mounted on a specially crafted wooden frame shortly after succumbing to wounds sustained in the Battle of Lützen (1632)

The coronation carriage (Kröningsvagn) of Queen Christina in 1650

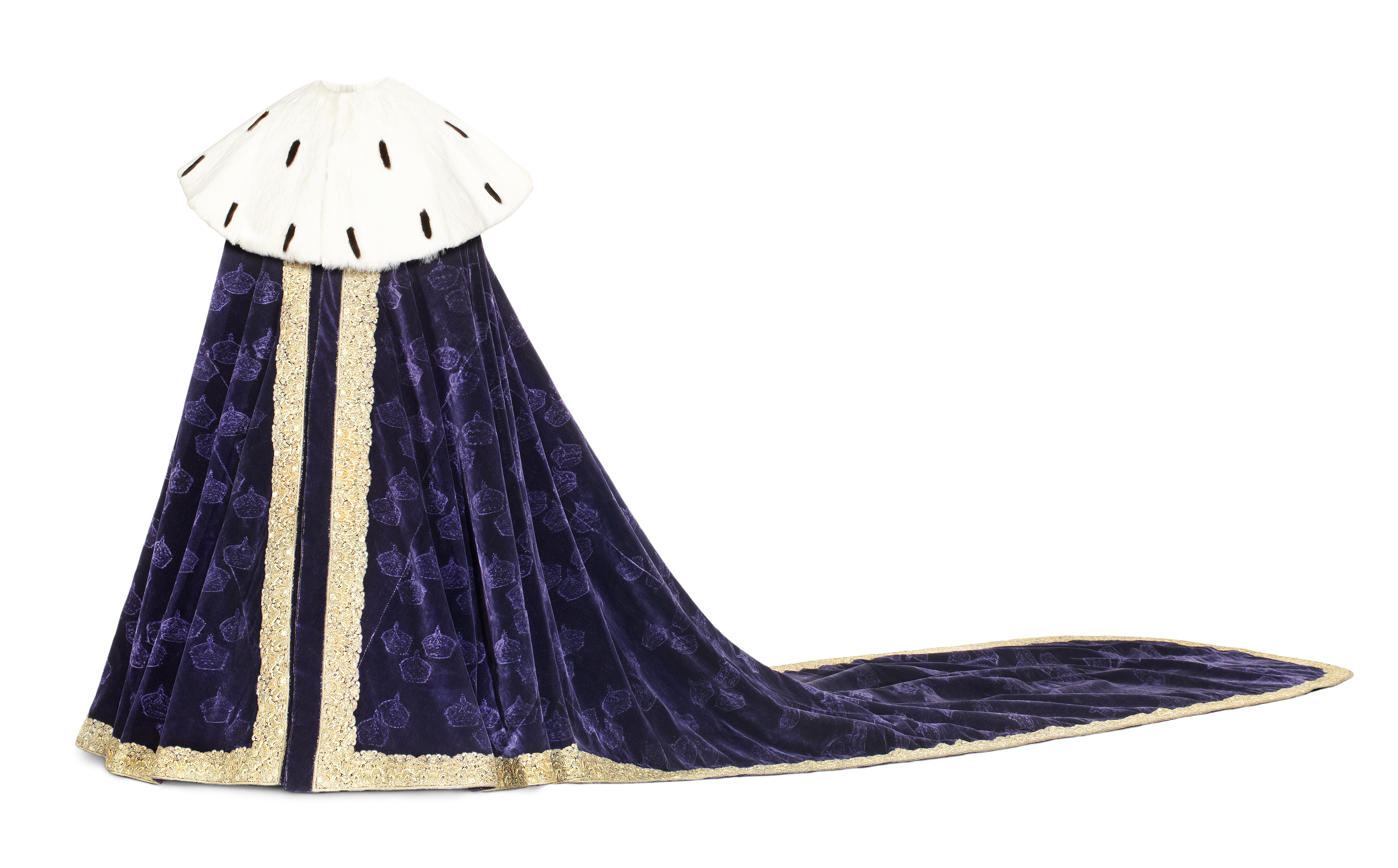
Queen Christina's coronation robe, 1650

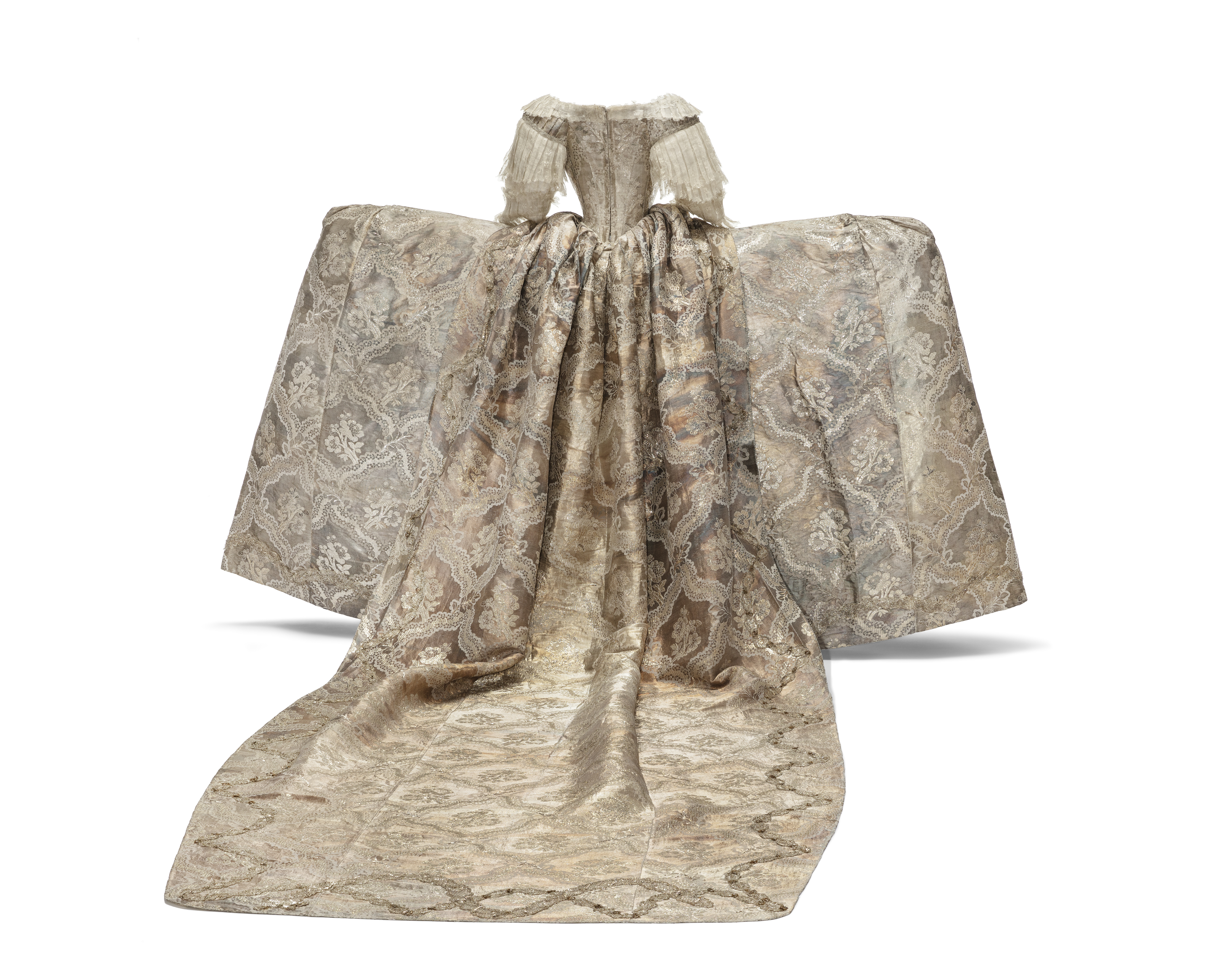
Wedding dress of queen Sophia Magdalena, 1766

The uniform and attire of King Charles XII, worn on the day he was fatally shot at Fredriksten Fortress

Artifacts relating to the 1792 assassination of King Gustav III, including his bloodstained waistcoat, masquerade masks, cuirass, and warning letter

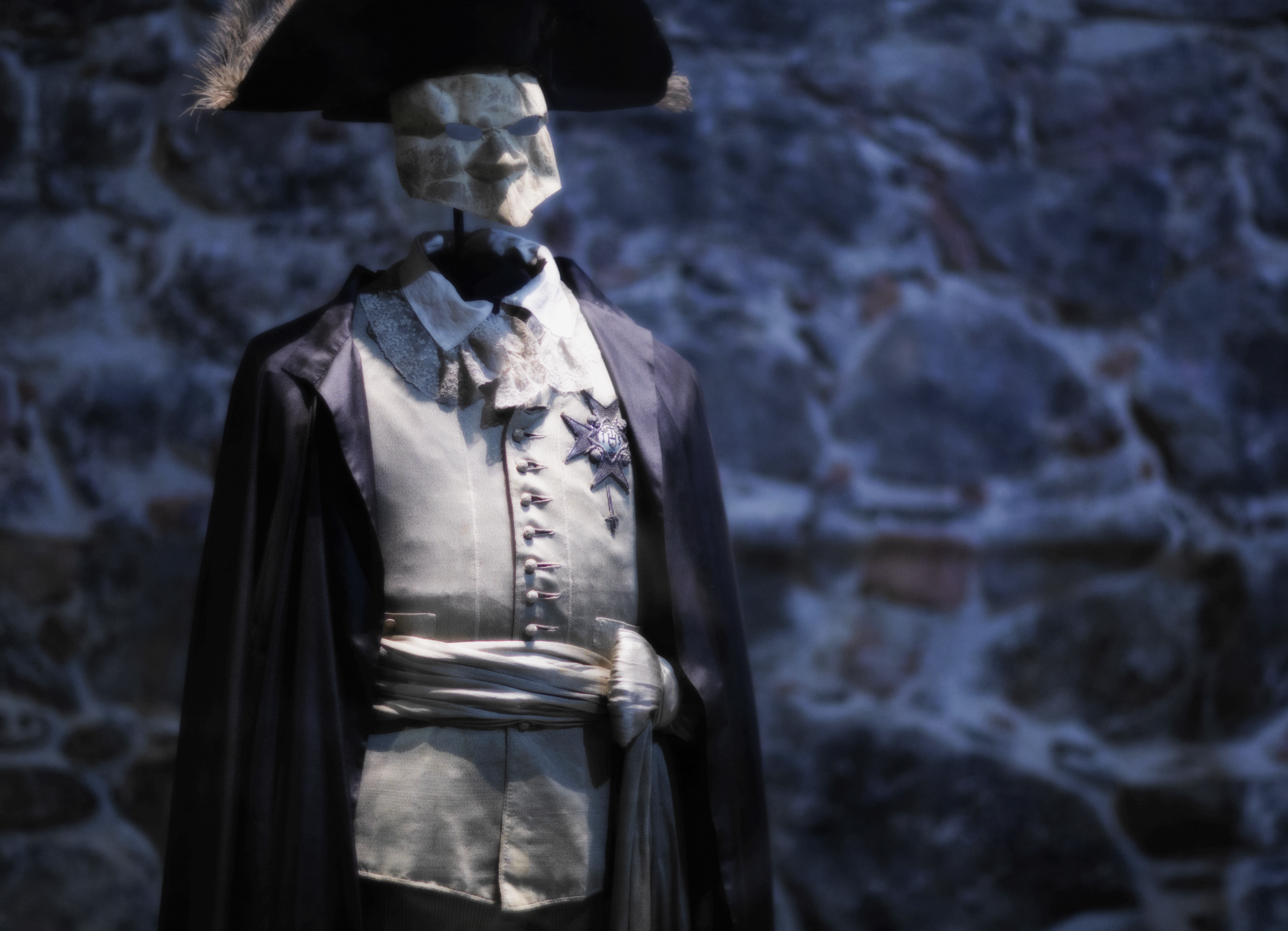
Gustav III's masquerade dress

== See also ==
- List of museums in Stockholm
