= Swedish coronation robes =

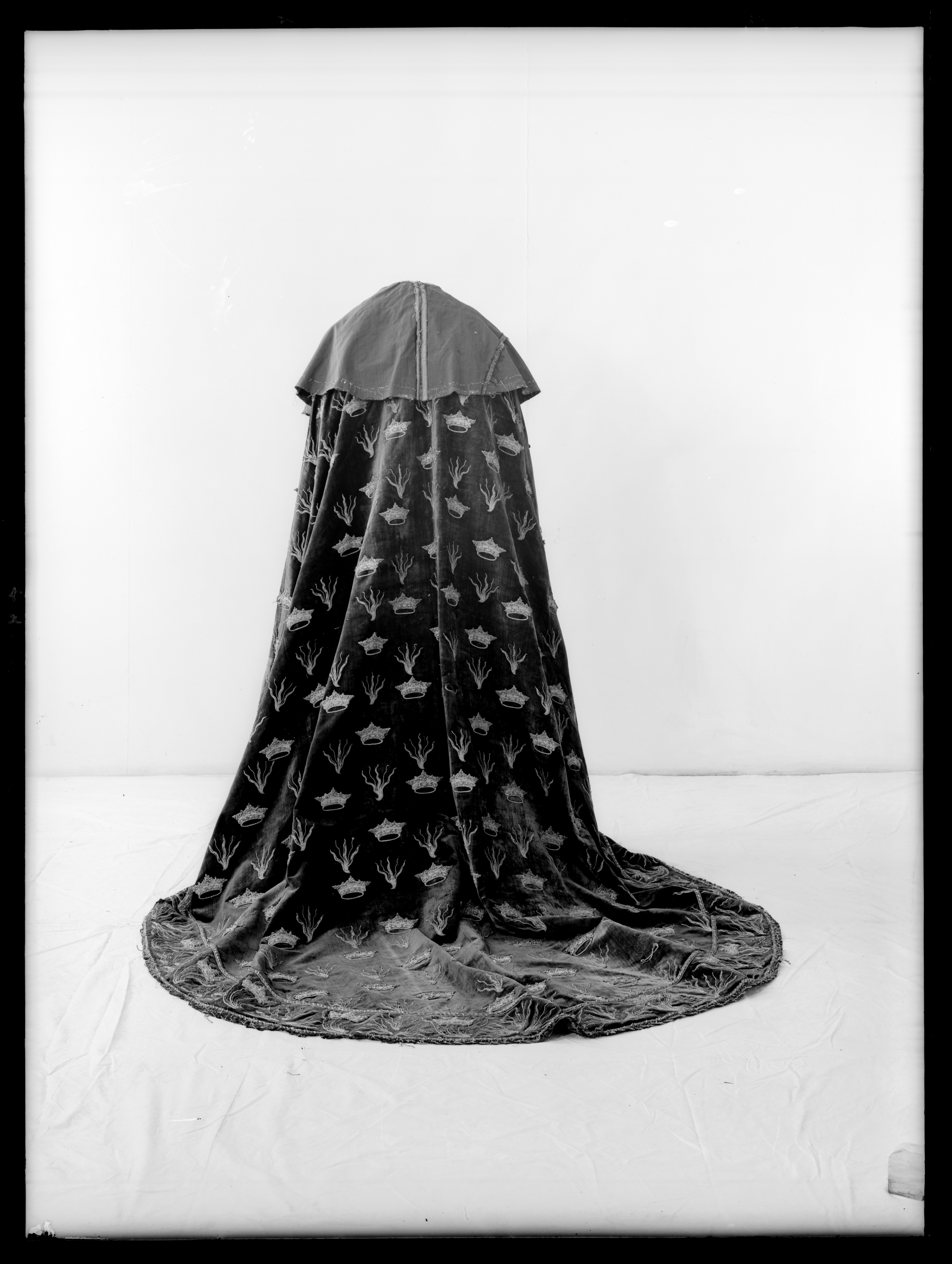
Robe of the Heir apparent with crowns and flames (1650)

Several Swedish coronation robes from the 16th to the 19th century are preserved at The Royal Armoury in Stockholm, Sweden. The youngest one, Oscar II's coronation robe from 1873, is in the Treasury at Stockholm Palace.

The oldest coronation robes are in a deep purple colour, which differers from the more bright red colour that were in fashion from the 18th century and onward. The purple colour was charged with symbolism and reserved for the elite.

The princely mantles, unlike the monarch's, were not purple but blue. This type of mantle has been used by Swedish princes and princesses since at least the 18th century.

== Royal mantles ==
=== Eric XIV of Sweden ===
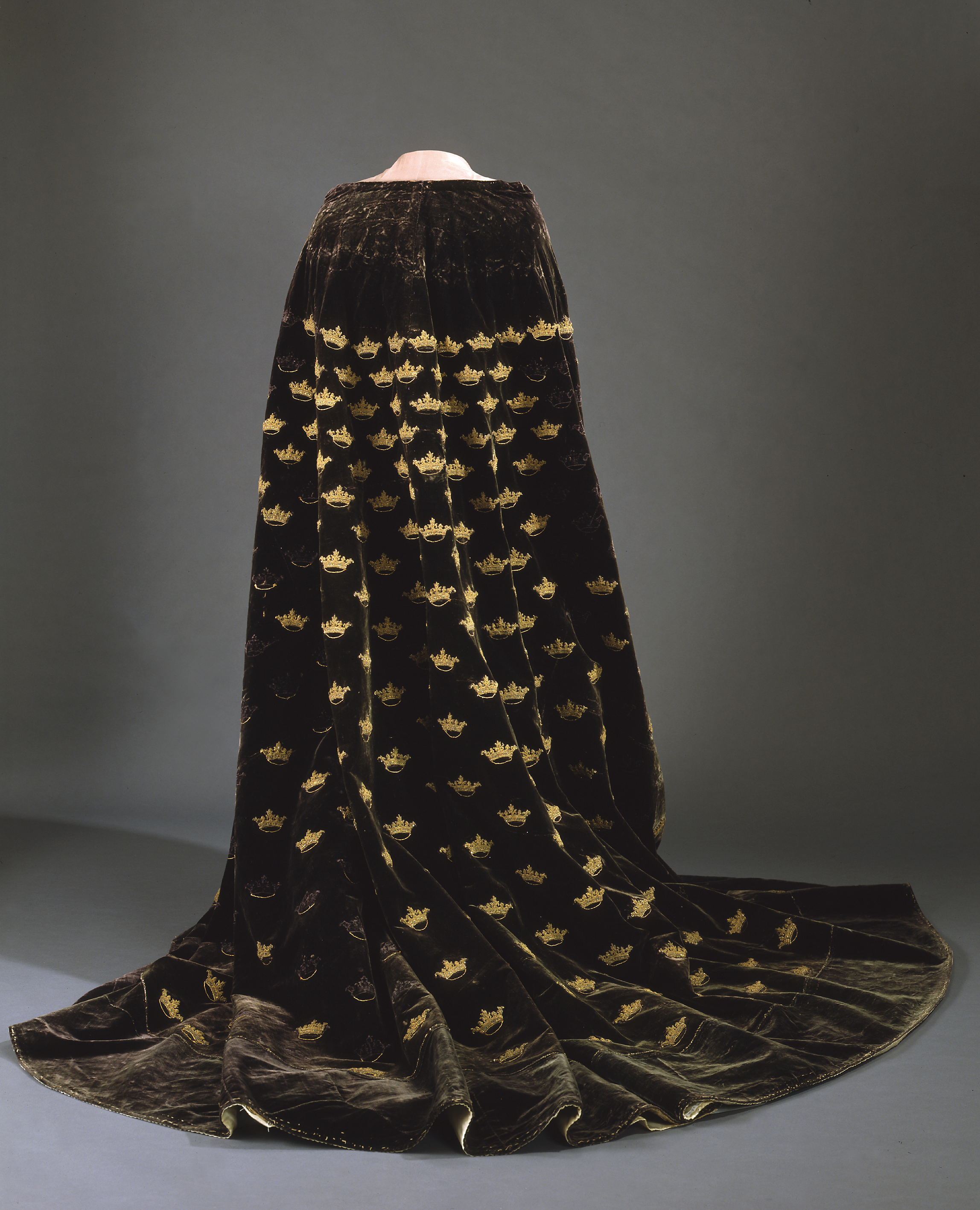
Eric XIV's coronation robe from 1561

Eric XIV's coronation robe is the oldest garment that has been kept from a Swedish coronation. It is a velvet robe in a deep purple colour. Originally the robe was decorated with 455 golden crowns. The crowns are embroidered with golden, white, blue and pink silk, and on each crown ten small pearls were attached. Today only 296 of the crowns remain. When king Eric was crowned the robe also had a trimming and a collar made out of ermine. After Eric XIV, John III, Charles IX and Gustav II Adolf have used the robe during their coronations.

=== Christina of Sweden ===
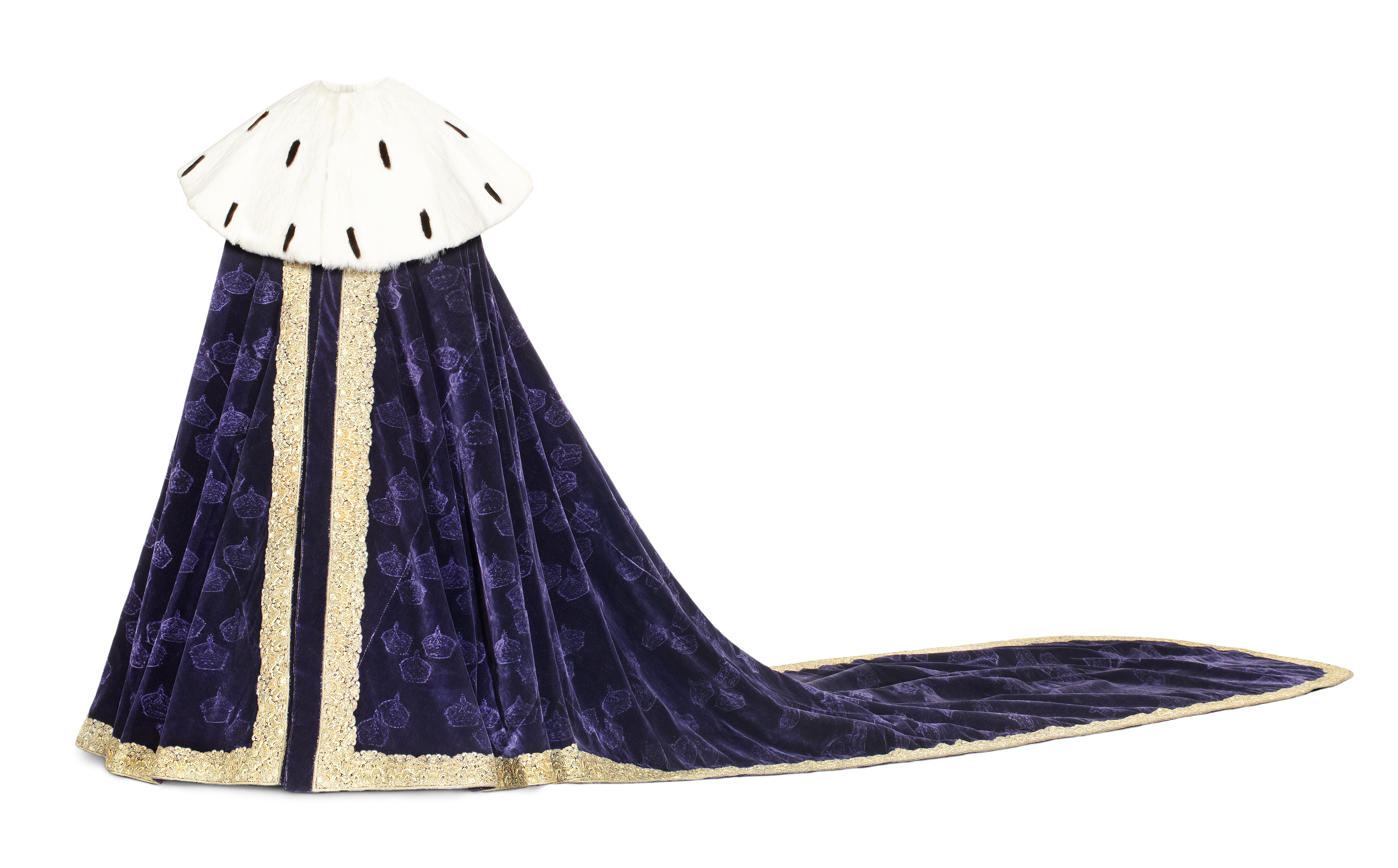
Queen Christina's purple velvet coronation robe (1650)

Queen Christina's coronation robe was ordered in Paris for the coronation in 1650. The blue and violet, purple velvet robe was originally decorated with 764,5 embroidered crowns in gold, and sewn on pearls. Both the crowns and the pearls were ripped out during the 18th century. The ermine collar and trimming is also missing today. The robe has also been worn by Charles XI, Charles X Gustav and Charles XII. The last one to be crowned in Christina's robe was Frederick I in 1720.

=== Ulrika Eleonora of Sweden ===
For Queen Ulrika Eleonora the Younger's coronation in 1718 a blue and violet, purple robe, originally made for Charles X Gustav, was used. The decor consisted of golden flames and crowns. The robe was also worn by Hedwig Eleonora during her son's, Charles XI's, coronation. The ermine lining was removed in 1770.

=== Adolf Frederick of Sweden ===
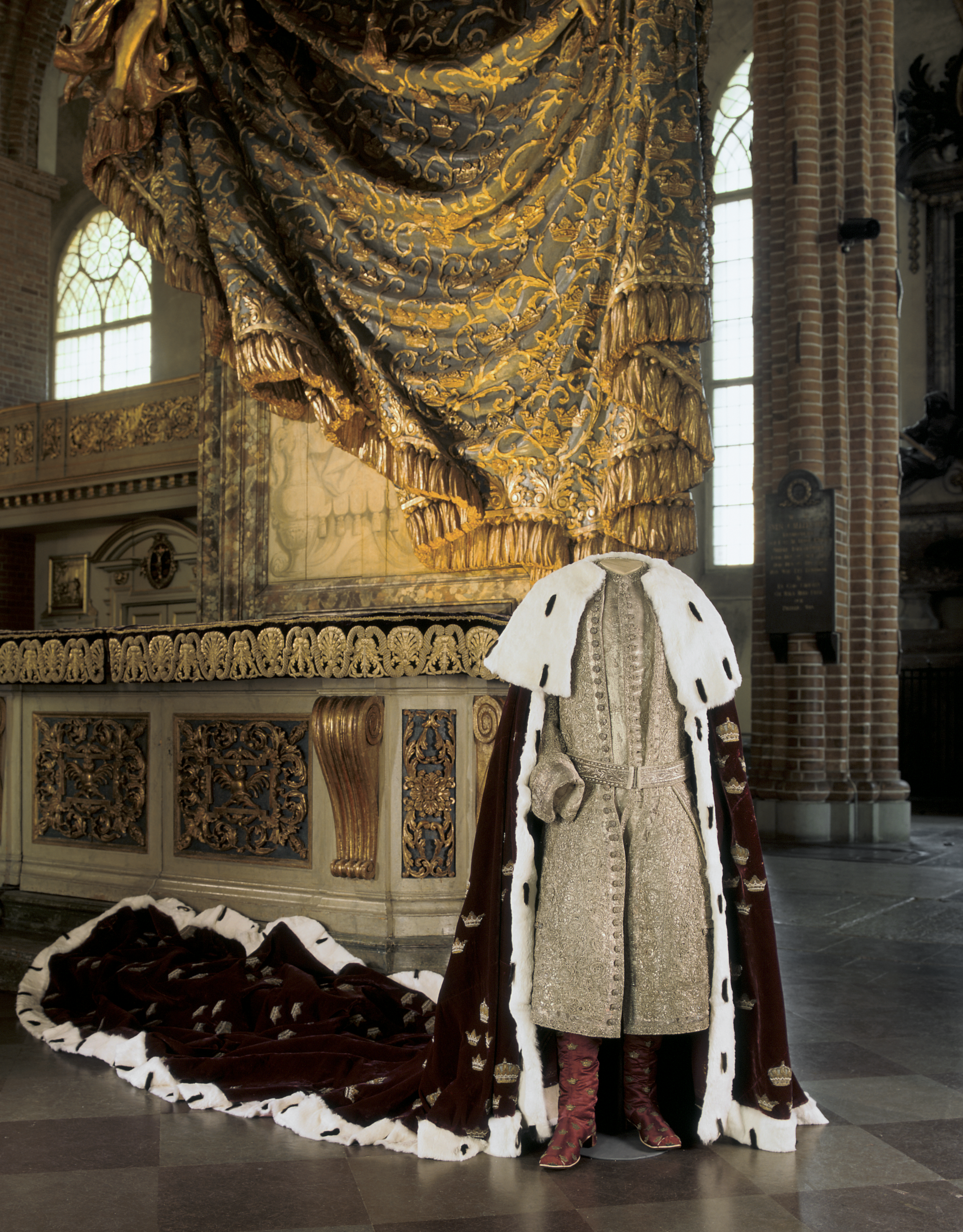
Adolf Frederick's coronation robe from 1751

Adolf Frederick's coronation robe is made out of red and violet, purple velvet and it was bought in Paris in 1751. It is decorated with groups of crowns embroidered with gold and silver threads. The lining is made of ermine, and the robe has been worn by Gustav III, Gustav IV Adolf, Charles XIII and Charles XIV John at their coronations. The train was extended for the coronation of Gustav III in 1772.

== Princely mantles ==
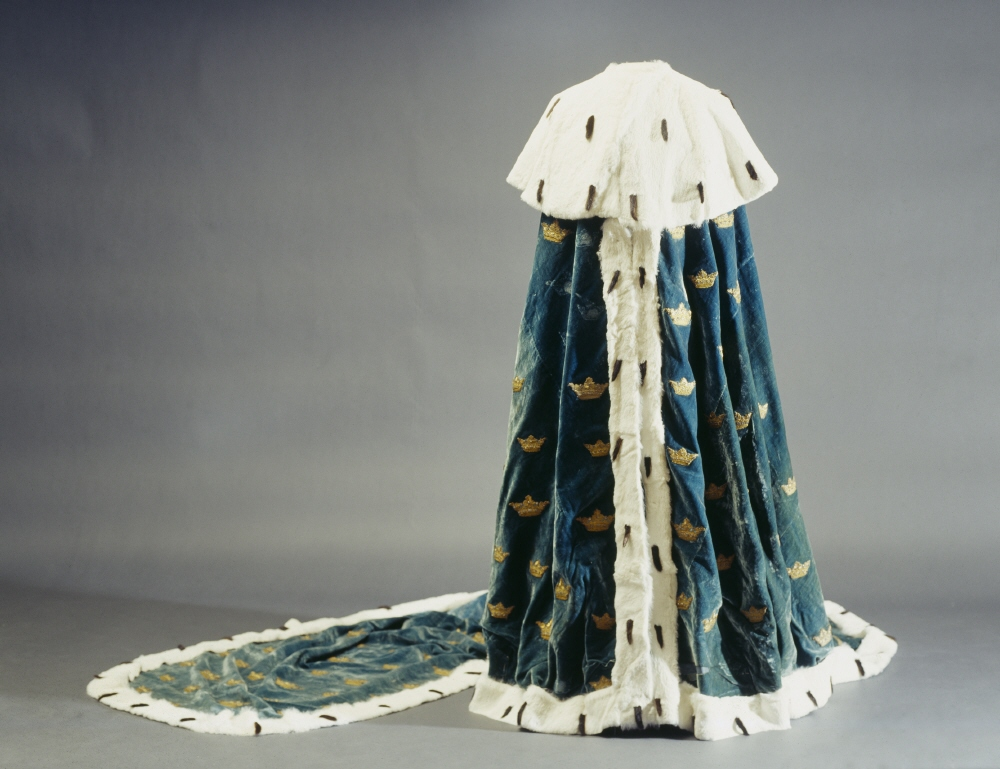
Princely mantle from 1772

At the Swedish court since the 18th century, there emerged the distinction of using blue for princes and purple for the king; mantles, boots and headgear followed this rule. The distinction was observed at the coronation of King Adolf Frederick and Queen Louisa Ulrika in 1751; the King and Queen arrived at the ceremony wearing blue princely mantles and left wearing the purple royal mantles.

The colour used for the mantles is described in the documents as Bleu Royal, i.e. royal blue. The mantles themselves were worn until 1907, during the state opening of the Riksdag. As King Gustaf V would not undergo a coronation, the practice of wearing the mantles, both royal and princely, stopped. However, the royal mantle was still laid out over the silver throne at solemn ceremonies, such as the Riksdag's formal opening, until 1974.

== See also ==
- Regalia of Sweden
