= List of World Heritage Sites in Sweden =

Location of World Heritage Sites within Sweden. Red dots indicate cultural sites, the green dot is the natural site, the yellow dot is the mixed site, and the small blue dots indicate the sites of the Struve Geodetic Arc.

The United Nations Educational, Scientific and Cultural Organization (UNESCO) World Heritage Sites are places of importance to cultural or natural heritage as described in the UNESCO World Heritage Convention, established in 1972. Cultural heritage consists of monuments (such as architectural works, monumental sculptures, or inscriptions), groups of buildings, and sites (including archaeological sites). Natural heritage consists of natural features (physical and biological formations), geological and physiographical formations (including habitats of threatened species of animals and plants), and natural sites which are important from the point of view of science, conservation, or natural beauty. The Kingdom of Sweden accepted the convention on 22 January 1985, making its historical sites eligible for inclusion on the list.

As of 2020, there are fifteen World Heritage Sites in Sweden, including thirteen cultural sites, one natural site and one mixed site. The first Swedish site added to the list was the Royal Domain of Drottningholm, inscribed at the 15th session of the World Heritage Committee, held in Carthage, Tunisia, in 1991. The most recent site added to the current list is the Decorated Farmhouses of Hälsingland, inscribed in 2012.

There are two transnational sites. The High Coast / Kvarken Archipelago is shared with Finland, while the Struve Geodetic Arc is shared with nine other countries. As of 2024, Sweden also has one site on the tentative list.

== World Heritage Sites ==
UNESCO lists sites under ten criteria; each entry must meet at least one of the criteria. Criteria i through vi are cultural, and vii through x are natural.

* Transnational site

World Heritage Sites
Site	Image	Location	Year listed	UNESCO data	Description
Royal Domain of Drottningholm	Palace with a yellow facade and green roof, park in front	Stockholm	1991	559; iv (cultural)	The Drottningholm Palace is the private residence of the Swedish royal family, located on the island of Lovön in Lake Mälaren in a suburb of Stockholm. The property dates back to the 17th century, with modifications in the 18th century, and includes the still-functioning theatre, a Chinese Pavilion, a Canton Village, and surrounding gardens. The rich interiors of the palace reflect the fact that Sweden was one of the strongest powers in 17th century Europe. The architecture of the ensemble was influenced by the Palace of Versailles.
Birka and Hovgården	People observing archaeological excavation	Stockholm	1993	555; iii, iv (cultural)	The two sites make up an architectural complex from the Viking Age. Birka was an important mercantile town and a commercial hub in the Baltic region that reached its peak between 750 and 980 CE. It was also the site of the first Christian congregation in Sweden, established by Saint Ansgar around 830. Birka declined in the 10th century when Sigtuna became the main trading center. The royal residence remained at nearby Hovgården, as demonstrated by the runic inscription and the ruins of Alsnö hus, the venue for the Royal Council of 1280, which established the foundation of the Swedish medieval feudal system.
Engelsberg Ironworks	Some of the buildings of the complex, painted red	Västmanland	1993	556; iv (cultural)	Engelsberg Ironworks is the best preserved and most complete example of a Swedish iron-working estate (järnbruk) of the 17th to 19th centuries, when Sweden was a world leader in the field. The tradition of iron ore mining and smelting in the area dates back to the 12th century. The first blast furnace was built in 1681 to produce pig iron, while the present one was built in 1778–79 and incorporated a number of technological innovations of the era. Additional forges and kilns were built in the 19th century. The ironworks closed down in 1919 as it was no longer economical. Over 50 buildings of various ages and functions have been preserved, including technological, administrative, and residential buildings.
Rock Carvings in Tanum	Carvings representing people and boats, painted red	Västra Götaland	1994	557; i, iii, iv (cultural)	The petroglyphs carved on a granite bedrock originate from the Nordic Bronze Age (from about 1700 to 500 BCE). There are around 1500 known sites with carvings depicting humans, animals, weapons, tools, and other subjects. They provide evidence about the life and beliefs of people who made them, and some settings were interpreted as primary contemporary centers for worship and cult. Some carvings have been painted red to make them more visible for tourists; a practice that has drawn criticism for removing the authenticity and original state of the drawings.
Skogskyrkogården	Cemetery and trees, a path in the right side of the picture	Stockholm	1994	558; ii, iv (cultural)	Skogskyrkogården, "The Woodland Cemetery", is a cemetery located south of central Stockholm, in Gamla Enskede district. It was designed by architects Gunnar Asplund and Sigurd Lewerentz on the site of former gravel pits overgrown with pine trees. It was built in 1917–1920, with additional buildings being added until 1940. Skogskyrkogården is a significant example of how architectural features can be wholly integrated into the environment and has had a profound influence on cemetery design in many countries worldwide.
Hanseatic Town of Visby	Visby fortification walls	Gotland	1995	731; iv, v (cultural)	The town of Visby, on the island of Gotland, was the main centre of the Hanseatic League in the Baltic region from the 12th to the 14th century. Originally a Viking settlement at a strategic location on a shore with a natural harbour, sheltered by steep cliff formations, in the 13th century Visby transformed to an impressive metropolis, surrounded by a strong defensive wall (Visby City Wall). Over 200 warehouses and merchants’ dwellings from medieval times are preserved. Visby's role started declining in the second half of the 14th century due to warfare, piracy, and changes to trade routes. The city declined after it was sacked by an army from Lübeck in 1525.
Church Town of Gammelstad, Luleå	Church, surrounded by red wooden houses	Norrbotten	1996	762; ii, iv, v (cultural)	Gammelstad is the oldest and best preserved "church village", a type of settlement that was once common in north Scandinavia. The town consists of a 15th-century stone church, Nederluleå Church, surrounded by over 400 wooden cottages that were built for the worshippers that came to Gammelstad on Sundays and for religious festivals. As the surrounding area was sparsely populated and the travel to the town was challenging in harsh climatic conditions, the cottages provided overnight housing for worshippers before they returned home.
Laponian Area	River delta, look from above	Norrbotten	1996	774; iii, v, vii, viii, ix (mixed)	The Laponian Area is a vast mountainous wilderness in northern Sweden. Covering 9,400 square kilometres (3,600 sq mi), it is the world's largest unmodified nature area to be still cultured by the indigenous population, namely the Saami people who herd reindeer and follow annual migration paths. There are four national parks and two nature reserves in the area, which is also important for its glacial landforms and biodiversity. The adjacent area in Norway, Tysfjorden, the fjord of Hellemobotn and Rago, is currently being considered for addition to the site.
Naval Port of Karlskrona	A church in the middle of the square, some cars parked in front	Blekinge	1998	871; ii, iv (cultural)	Karlskrona is the only Swedish city in the Baroque style. It was founded in 1680, during the reign of King Charles XI, to replace Stockholm as the new naval base for Swedish Navy, a major naval power of the era. In addition to the city, the site includes the naval infrastructure at the island of Trossö with its inner fortifications, outer fortifications at Drottningskär Citadel and Kungsholms Fort, as well as Skärfva Manor House and the Crown Mill at Lyckeby. Inspired by older naval bases, Karlskrona in turn influenced subsequent naval bases and cities of this type.
Agricultural Landscape of Southern Öland	Grass field, stone enclosures and a fortress in the background	Kalmar	2000	968; iv, v (cultural)	The southern part of the island of Öland in the Baltic Sea is dominated by a vast limestone plateau, Stora Alvaret. The island has been inhabited for about five thousand years. The barren soil presented a constraint to the land use. For millennia, certain areas have been designated as pastures and others for agriculture.
High Coast / Kvarken Archipelago*	A gulf surrounded by forest on both sides	Västernorrland	2000	898; viii (natural)	Both the High Coast (originally listed individually) and the Kvarken Archipelago (in Finland, extended in 2006) are situated in the Gulf of Bothnia and include thousands of islands. The area shows prominent effects of the post-glacial rebound, the rising of the land following the melting of the continental ice sheet after the Last Glacial Maximum (thus removing the weight of the glaciers), 10,000 to 24,000 years ago. The rising, in some places up to almost 300 metres (980 ft), is constantly changing the landscape.
Mining Area of the Great Copper Mountain in Falun	Open pit mine and mining infrastructure in the background	Dalarna	2001	1027; ii, iii, v (cultural)	The Great Copper Mountain was one of the most important mining areas in Europe, especially in dominating the production of copper. Mining operations started in the 9th century and culminated in the 17th century. The most prominent feature of the area is the Great Pit excavation (Stora Stöten). In addition to mining and industrial heritage, numerous small mining settlements bear testimony to the socio-economic development of mining communities.
Grimeton Radio Station, Varberg	White main building and antennas in the background	Halland	2004	1134; ii, iv (cultural)	Grimeton Radio Station is an early longwave transatlantic wireless telegraphy station built in 1922–24. The site comprises the main buildings, designed in the Neoclassical style by the architect Carl Åkerblad, and the antenna towers, which at 127 metres (417 ft) were the tallest structures in Sweden when constructed. The station, which uses the early pre-electronic radio transmitter technology called an Alexanderson alternator, is still fully operational.
Struve Geodetic Arc*	Two people on the top of the hill, covered by flowers	Norrbotten	2005	1187; ii, iii, vi (cultural)	The Struve Geodetic Arc is a series of triangulation points, stretching over a distance of 2,820 kilometres (1,750 mi) from Hammerfest in Norway to the Black Sea. The points were set up in a survey by the astronomer Friedrich Georg Wilhelm von Struve, who first carried out an accurate measurement of a long segment of a meridian, which helped to establish the size and shape of the Earth. Originally, there were 265 station points. The World Heritage Site includes 34 points in ten countries (north to south: Norway, Sweden, Finland, Russia, Estonia, Latvia, Lithuania, Belarus, Moldova, Ukraine), four of which are in Sweden (Jupukka hill, one of the Sweden's station points, pictured).
Decorated Farmhouses of Hälsingland	Farmhouse, painted red with white windows. A fence in front	Gävleborg	2012	1282; v (cultural)	This property includes seven timber farmhouses in Gävleborg County. They were constructed in the 19th century by wealthy independent farmers. The owners commissioned local artists to paint the interiors, with special rooms or separate buildings intended for festivities being the most richly decorated. The paintings represent a fusion of folk styles with influences from Baroque and Rococo. The seven farmhouses are Kristofers farm, Stene, Järvsö, Gästgivars farm, Vallstabyn, Pallars farm, Långhed, Jon-Lars farm, Långhed, Bortom åa farm, Gammelgården, Bommars farm, Letsbo, Ljusdal, and Erik-Anders farm, Askesta village, Söderala.

== Tentative sites ==
In addition to sites inscribed on the World Heritage List, member states can maintain a list of tentative sites that they may consider for nomination. Nominations for the World Heritage List are only accepted if the site was previously listed on the tentative list. As of 2020, Sweden recorded one site on its tentative list.

Tentative sites
Site	Image	Location	Year listed	UNESCO criteria	Description
The Rise of Systematic Biology*	Garden in front, houses and trees in the background	Kronoberg and Uppsala	2009	vi (cultural)	This entry encompasses sites connected to the foundation of modern systematic biology. It is aimed to include 13 sites in eight countries. Swedish components associated with the life and work of Carl Linnaeus include Råshult (his birthplace, pictured), the Linnaean Garden, the Linnaean Museum, Herbationes Upsalienses, Hågadalen-Nåsten Nature Reserve, Fäbodmossen Nature Reserve, Årike Fyris and Linnaeus' Hammarby.

== See also ==
- Tourism in Sweden
- List of national parks of Sweden
