= Listed buildings in Gävleborg County =

There are 101 listed buildings (Swedish: byggnadsminne) in Gävleborg County.

== Bollnäs Municipality ==
Image	Name	Premises	Number of buildings	Year built	Architect	Coordinates	ID
	Gästgivars	Vallsta 1:2	10			61.53231°N 16.36751°E	21000001714750
	Rehnstedts	Ren 30:404	1			61.35391°N 16.44577°E	21300000012226
	Renshammar	Ren 15:11; Previously 15:1	3			61.35499°N 16.42540°E	21300000012225
	Styfstorpet	Voxsätter 4:30	7			61.31041°N 16.43564°E	21300000012466
	Västansjö ullspinneri	Västansjö 4:4	1			61.19555°N 16.45208°E	21300000012341
	Växbo kvarn	Växbo 15:2	4			61.40548°N 16.55529°E	21300000012237

== Gävle Municipality ==
Image	Name	Premises	Number of buildings	Year built	Architect	Coordinates	ID
	Berggrenska gården	Norr 39:3 previously Lyktan	4			60.67343°N 17.14346°E	21300000012264
	Bönans fyr-, lotsplats	Bönan 5:2	1			60.73895°N 17.31907°E	21300000012448
	Bränneridrängarnas hus, Engelska byggningen	Strömsbro 57:7-16	5			60.70068°N 17.15952°E	21300000012312
	Buregården	Söder 17:7	1			60.67307°N 17.15240°E	21300000012447
	Dybeckska gården	Norr 34:4 previously Oxenstjärna 4	4			60.67480°N 17.14674°E	21300000012469
	Forsbacka herrgård	Forsbacka 20:9	7			60.61085°N 16.90601°E	21300000012470
	Frimurarhuset	Norr 43:1 previously Wachtmeister 1	1			60.67470°N 17.14835°E	21300000012266
	Kvarteret Springer 2	Brynäs 9:2	3			60.67472°N 17.15884°E	21300000012252
	Kvarteret Springer 3	Brynäs 9:3	3			60.67467°N 17.15867°E	21300000012253
	Kvarteret Springer 4	Brynäs 9:4	3			60.67469°N 17.15851°E	21300000012256
	Kvarteret Springer 5	Brynäs 9:5	3			60.67469°N 17.15833°E	21300000012160
	Kvarteret Springer 6	Brynäs 9:6	3			60.67465°N 17.15816°E	21300000012258
	Televerkets hus	Norr 25:5	1			60.67615°N 17.14687°E	21300000012460
	Kvarteret Kollegan 1	Norr 4:1	3			60.67625°N 17.13886°E	21300000012261
	Lars-Ors	Oppala 5:42	3			60.76478°N 17.17123°E	21000001444700
	Länsfängelset, Gävle	Söder 6:4	2			60.67149°N 17.14293°E	21300000012260
	Strömsbro textilfabrik	Strömsbro 77:6	7			60.69818°N 17.15973°E	21000001445340
	Gävle slott	Söder 5:1 previously Gefleborg 1	4			60.67218°N 17.14383°E	21300000005658
	Gävle södra station	Norrtull 36:19	1			60.67203°N 17.15523°E	21300000012267
	Gävle Teater	Norrtull 28:2 previously Thalia 2	1			60.67784°N 17.14116°E	21300000012268
	Kronobränneriet, Testebokvarn	Strömsbro 77:6 previously Vävaren1	2			60.69866°N 17.16027°E	21300000012330
	Kronobränneriets magasin	Strömsbro 34:2 previously Korset 2	1			60.70298°N 17.15850°E	21300000012280
	Mackmyra herrgård, stångjärnssmedja	Mackmyra 28:1, 17:2, 13:1	7			60.64004°N 16.96688°E	21300000012409
	Själanderska skolan	Norr 16:1 previously Kustos 1	1			60.67647°N 17.14354°E	21300000012263
	Stenebergs sockerbruk	Pumpmakaren nr 3	1			60.67142°N 17.16005°E	21300000012270
	Strömsbro gamla skola	Skolmästaren 1	1			60.70438°N 17.15894°E	21300000012279
	Strömsbrogården	Strömsbro herrgård; Strömsbro 16:1 - 16:4 previously Strömkarlen 1 Stg 172	3			60.70279°N 17.15765°E	21300000012282
	Tingshuset i Gävle	Väster 32:3 previously Väster 32:1-2; Notarius 3	1			60.67224°N 17.13928°E	21300000012272
	Tolvfors bruk	Tolvfors 2:1	28			60.68071°N 17.11028°E	21300000012334
	Westergrenska stiftelsen	Vallbacken 19:1	1			60.66720°N 17.13962°E	21300000012285
	Åby gård	Åby 4:2	1			60.64718°N 17.03819°E	21300000016406

== Hofors Municipality ==
Image	Name	Premises	Number of buildings	Year built	Architect	Coordinates	ID
	Erkas	Åsmundshyttan 12:7	5			60.47817°N 16.46580°E	21300000012408

== Hudiksvall Municipality ==
Image	Name	Premises	Number of buildings	Year built	Architect	Coordinates	ID
	Brunska gården	Kv. Gamla apoteket 1	4			61.72731°N 17.11338°E	21300000012475
	Byströms	Trogsta 2:2	7			61.71841°N 16.91171°E	21300000012244
	Ede såg	Ede 11:14	3			61.80857°N 16.55101°E	21300000012240
	Oppegården	Halsta 1:1	15			61.77611°N 17.07314°E	21000001651081
	Hudiksvalls stationshus, perrongtak	Strand 3:7 previously 3:1	2			61.72436°N 17.10829°E	21300000012313
	Iggesunds gamla järnverk	Iggesunds bruk 1:1	2			61.63894°N 17.07237°E	21300000012393
	Movikens masugn	Moviken 2:6	2			61.93204°N 16.65655°E	21300000012205
	Norrgården i Flatmo	Flatmo 2:6	5			61.79713°N 16.84616°E	21300000012241
	Rönnebo	Änga 6:15	1			61.85428°N 16.56502°E	21300000012219
	Strömbacka smedja	Strömbacka 1:58, 1:2	2			61.95897°N 16.71885°E	21300000012218
	Ystegårn	Hillsta 6:1-2	11			61.73639°N 16.88123°E	21300000012441

== Ljusdal Municipality ==
Image	Name	Premises	Number of buildings	Year built	Architect	Coordinates	ID
	Digerkölsvallen	Hårva 7:9, 7:5, 1:8-9, 6:11, 6:4-5, 16:2, 5:4, 12:5, 15:1; Svedja 7:29, 5:6, 7:10-11, 8:13-14	27			61.88699°N 15.31777°E	21300000020256
	Fågelsö gammelgård	Fågelsjö 1:1, 1:4	14			61.79644°N 14.63431°E	21300000016686
	Gammellåks	Karsjö 1:46	10			61.63851°N 16.26505°E	21300000012371
	Härbet i Yg	Yg 2:33	1			61.80031°N 15.91155°E	21300000012245
	Härbret i Sandvik	Gärde 1:17	1			61.98688°N 16.04846°E	21300000012389
	Hians	Löräng 11:2	3			61.66770°N 16.14926°E	21300000025717
	Hybo stationshus	Hybo 13:4	1			61.79681°N 16.19229°E	21300000012382
	Järnvägshotellet	Kläppa 25:4	1			61.82724°N 16.09602°E	21300000012387
	Kristofers	Stene 3:19	5			61.70723°N 16.19586°E	21000001742801
	Kvistabäckens flottled	Gräningsvallen 1:4 previously Gäddsjö 1:1; Storhaga 13:2	none			62.14963°N 15.17057°E	21300000012485
	Bommars	Letsbo 2:10	7			61.93071°N 15.87808°E	21000001442760
	Los brynsåg	Storbyn 10:1	1			61.78083°N 15.17874°E	21000001586921
	Nors ångsåg	Nor 4:2	6			61.66131°N 16.32135°E	21300000012375
	Östigården	Storhaga 18:1	1			61.78543°N 15.95310°E	21300000012435
	Stenegården	Stene 9:1 previously Stene 5:1, 6:2	12			61.70839°N 16.18836°E	21300000012379
	Torkelsbo	Ångsäter 6:10, 6:25; Ljusdals-Ede 1:11	15			61.89153°N 16.12481°E	21300000012440
	Vålsjö kvarn	Nordsjö 3:39	3			61.73572°N 16.28423°E	21300000012482

== Nordanstig Municipality ==
Image	Name	Premises	Number of buildings	Year built	Architect	Coordinates	ID
	Ersk-Mats	Lindsjön 1:13	13			62.17356°N 16.51005°E	21300000012295
	Svensgård	Å 3:2	7			61.98167°N 17.26191°E	21300000023807

== Ockelbo Municipality ==
Image	Name	Premises	Number of buildings	Year built	Architect	Coordinates	ID
	Brattfors bruk	Brattfors 1:4, 1:8; Böle S:9, 1:49-50, 1:52-53, 1:55 previously Brattfors bruk 1:1; Åkerby 1:1	10			60.84338°N 16.66597°E	21300000012395
	Wij valsverk	Vi 1:150	1			60.88415°N 16.70617°E	21300000012397

== Ovanåker Municipality ==
Image	Name	Premises	Number of buildings	Year built	Architect	Coordinates	ID
	Bångagården	Alfta kyrkby 6:3	4			61.35003°N 16.15205°E	21300000012164
	Gamla pappershandeln	Norra Edsbyn 37:2	1			61.38315°N 15.81354°E	21300000012296
	Jon-Lars	Långhed 4:11; Långheds by	13			61.39010°N 16.05163°E	21300000000505
	Nygårds	Vängsbo 1:5; Vängsbo by	20			61.38415°N 15.92684°E	21300000000237
	Pallars	Långhed 12:5; Långheds by	11			61.39845°N 16.04583°E	21300000000514
	Skommars	Grängsbo 9:15; Grängsbo by	7			61.33057°N 15.90956°E	21300000023367
	Tutabo	Grängsbo 9:3; Grängsbo by	16			61.32781°N 15.89937°E	21300000023364
	Voxna herrgård	Njupan 1:62	1			61.36665°N 15.50865°E	21300000005153
	Voxna smedja	Njupan 1:1	1			61.36509°N 15.51199°E	21300000012300

== Sandviken Municipality ==
Image	Name	Premises	Number of buildings	Year built	Architect	Coordinates	ID
	Mjölnargården i Gavelhyttan	Nor 10:2	5			60.55954°N 16.61174°E	21300000012400
	Nygårds	Bro 3:7	16			60.60887°N 16.47982°E	21300000020255
	Riksdagsmans	Åsen 1:87	1			60.60795°N 16.60223°E	21300000012403

== Söderhamn Municipality ==
Image	Name	Premises	Number of buildings	Year built	Architect	Coordinates	ID
	Rådhustorget	Rådhuset 1 Fåret 2 Oxen 7 Hunden 1 Elefanten 1-4; Vargen 1–2, Pantern 6 Lejonet 1-2; Ekorren 1, Björnen 4 Hästen 3, 5	none				21300000012323
	Gamla gevärsfaktoriet	Borrhuset; Faktoriet 1	1			61.30106°N 17.04448°E	21300000012404
	Sidenhuset	Fåret 2	1			61.30110°N 17.04964°E	21300000016297
	Västergården i Asta	Askesta 5:2	2			61.27408°N 16.99284°E	21000001450740
	Kvarteret Björnen 4	Björnen 4	3			61.30225°N 17.05129°E	21300000016308
	Centralhotellet	Ekorren 1	2			61.30120°N 17.05168°E	21300000016309
	Rådhuskonditoriet	Elefanten 1	1			61.30149°N 17.05125°E	21300000016299
	Bergstedts	Elefanten 2	1			61.30154°N 17.05202°E	21300000016305
	Kvarteret Elefanten 3	Televerket; Elefanten 3	1			61.30174°N 17.05171°E	21300000016355
	Gamla posten	Elefanten 4	1			61.30171°N 17.05119°E	21300000016311
	Erik-Anders i Asta	Ellne 1:21	2			61.27243°N 16.99355°E	21000001308800
	Kvarteret Hästen 3	Hästen 3	1			61.30200°N 17.04963°E	21300000016310
	Kvarteret Hästen 5	Hästen 5	1			61.30224°N 17.04957°E	21300000016306
	Gamla järnvägsstationen	Hunden 1	1			61.30257°N 17.04964°E	21300000016298
	Förvaltningshuset	Lejonet 1-2	1			61.30028°N 17.05067°E	21300000018078
	Söderhamns station	Öster 3:3	1			61.30365°N 17.06534°E	21300000012442
	Stadshotellet	Oxen 7	1			61.30139°N 17.04978°E	21300000016302
	Odd Fellowlogen	Pantern 6	1			61.30029°N 17.04997°E	21300000016300
	Rådhuset	Rådhuset 1	1			61.30159°N 17.05053°E	21300000016296
	Kvarteret Tigern 5	Tigern 5	1			61.30042°N 17.05205°E	21300000016304
	Prästgården	Vargen 1	1			61.30261°N 17.05099°E	21300000016303
	Kvartetet Vargen 2	Vargen 2	1			61.30263°N 17.05156°E	21300000012486
	Järnvägsviadukten	Västra Berget 3:1; Östra Berget 3:1	1			61.30070°N 17.05082°E	21300000021639
	Storjungfruns fyrplats	Skärgården 2:90; fd stg 1063	1			61.16766°N 17.33444°E	21300000012487
