= Tourism in Sweden =

Tourism in Sweden comprised a relatively small part of the Swedish economy in 2011 at 2.9% of the country's GDP; at this time, tourism generated 264 billion Swedish krona, 98.8 billion of which was foreign-visitor expenditure in Sweden. 7.1% of Swedish household income is spent on domestic tourism.

Tourist arrivals of 2024 in %

One well-known tourist route is via train from southern to northern Sweden, viewing historical, natural and cultural attractions. This route is particularly popular among German tourists.

According to the CIA World Factbook, Sweden was the 21st most-visited country in the world, with 7,627,000 arrivals in 2006.

== Swedish culture ==
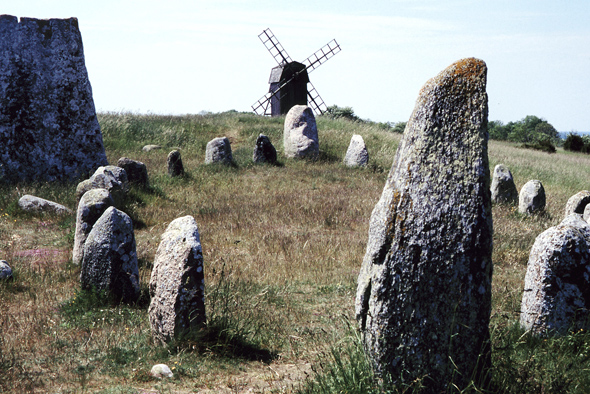
View from southern Öland

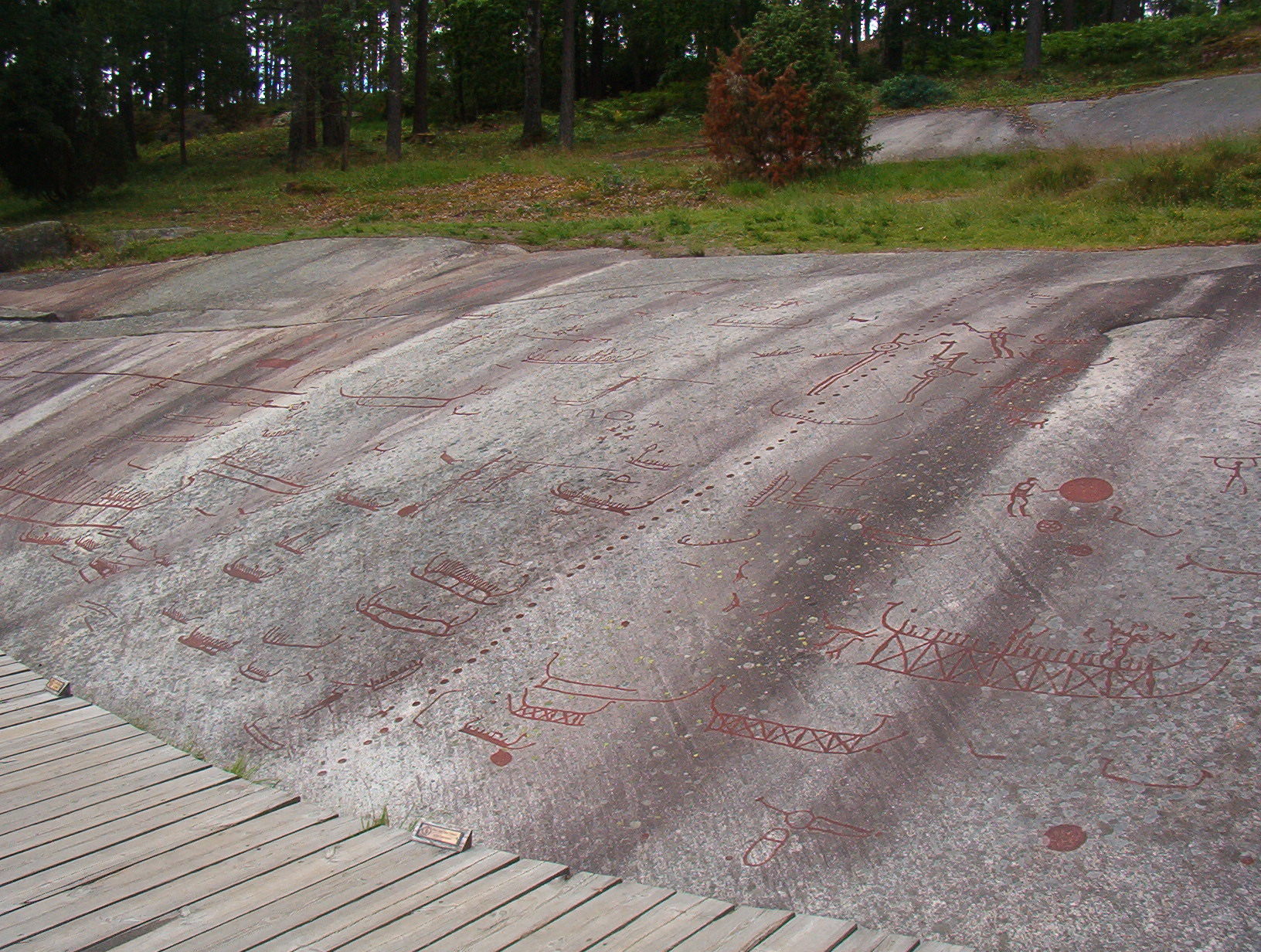
Tanumshede rock carvings

Sweden has a number of World Heritage Sites, which are popular as tourist destinations. These include:

- The agricultural landscape of the island of Öland, visited for its geological and geographical features
- Birka and Hovgården on the islands Björkö and Adelsö in Mälaren near Stockholm
- The church village of Gammelstad, Luleå, in northern Sweden
- Drottningholm Palace, Theatre, and the royal domain
- Engelsberg Ironworks
- The Hanseatic town of Visby
- The "High Coast" of Ångermanland
- Laponian area, Swedish Lapland, in northern Sweden
- The mining area of the Great Copper Mountain in Falun
- The naval port of Karlskrona
- Rock carvings in Tanumshede
- Skogskyrkogården in Stockholm

Swedish horse racing is an unusual attraction, in that many races are actually trotting races. The horses are not allowed to gallop; they pull a small vehicle ridden by the human racer.

== Swedish nature ==
Due to Sweden's northern location, the summer sun sets for only short periods of time (not at all north of the Arctic Circle). This phenomenon allows outdoor activities later in the evening than usual.

Sweden has a large number of lakes and forests; the former are popular for fishing and canoeing. There are several large lakes, including lakes Vättern and Vänern. The Göta Canal from Stockholm to Gothenburg allows for trips in the summer.

Hiking is popular in the summer, both in the forested regions as well as in the alpine landscapes.

Mountain-hiking is limited to the northern and north-western parts of Sweden where a nearly 1000 km long and 50 to 200 km wide mountain range borders to Norway. In the south the Swedish mountains are generally high rolling hills with some occasional pointy peaks, while the middle and particularly northern parts of the range gradually exhibit a more dramatic nature. Sweden, and Scandinavia in general, lacks notably high peaks (the highest mountain in Sweden is Mt. Kebnekaise near Kiruna, which is 2,096.8 metres (6,879 ft) high). Despite this, dramatic areas are found in several places, and the northernmost parts of the Swedish mountain range house a notably large and dramatic wild alpine region, known as Laponia area. This area includes world-famous mountain regions like the Sarek National Park and is sometimes referred to as "Europe's last wilderness" or "Europe's Alaska". Covering about 9400 km^{2}, the Laponia area is the largest wilderness in Europe with vast areas of untouched nature. This attracts many hikers each year, but visiting certain parts of the region requires experience since it is mostly roadless land with huge walking distances, uninhabited, and with a lack of cellphone reception in large parts.

Another popular area for Swedish mountain hiking is Kungsleden, or "The King's Trail". It is a 400 km long trail that reaches through nearly half the Swedish mountain range, from Abisko in the north, to Hemavan in the south. This hike does not require any extreme experience and staffed mountain huts with accommodation and small shops are located along the trail. It is said to be a great nature experience of world class, both for veterans as well as beginners.

An easier and more accessible Hiking route is the Silverleden. It's a 65 or 15 km long hiking trail that starts and ends at Hurtigtorpet in Hällefors. There is also a shorter stretch of 15 km that starts and ends in Sävenfors.

Silverleden is 65 km long and starts and ends at Hurtigtorpet in Hällefors. The trail offers hikers a challenge in hilly terrain with breathtaking views, beautiful forests and plenty of lakes and streams. Along the trail there are nice rest areas and wells where you can fill up with water. The trail gets its name from the silver mining that was extensive in this area during the 17th century.

== Northern Sweden and winter sports ==
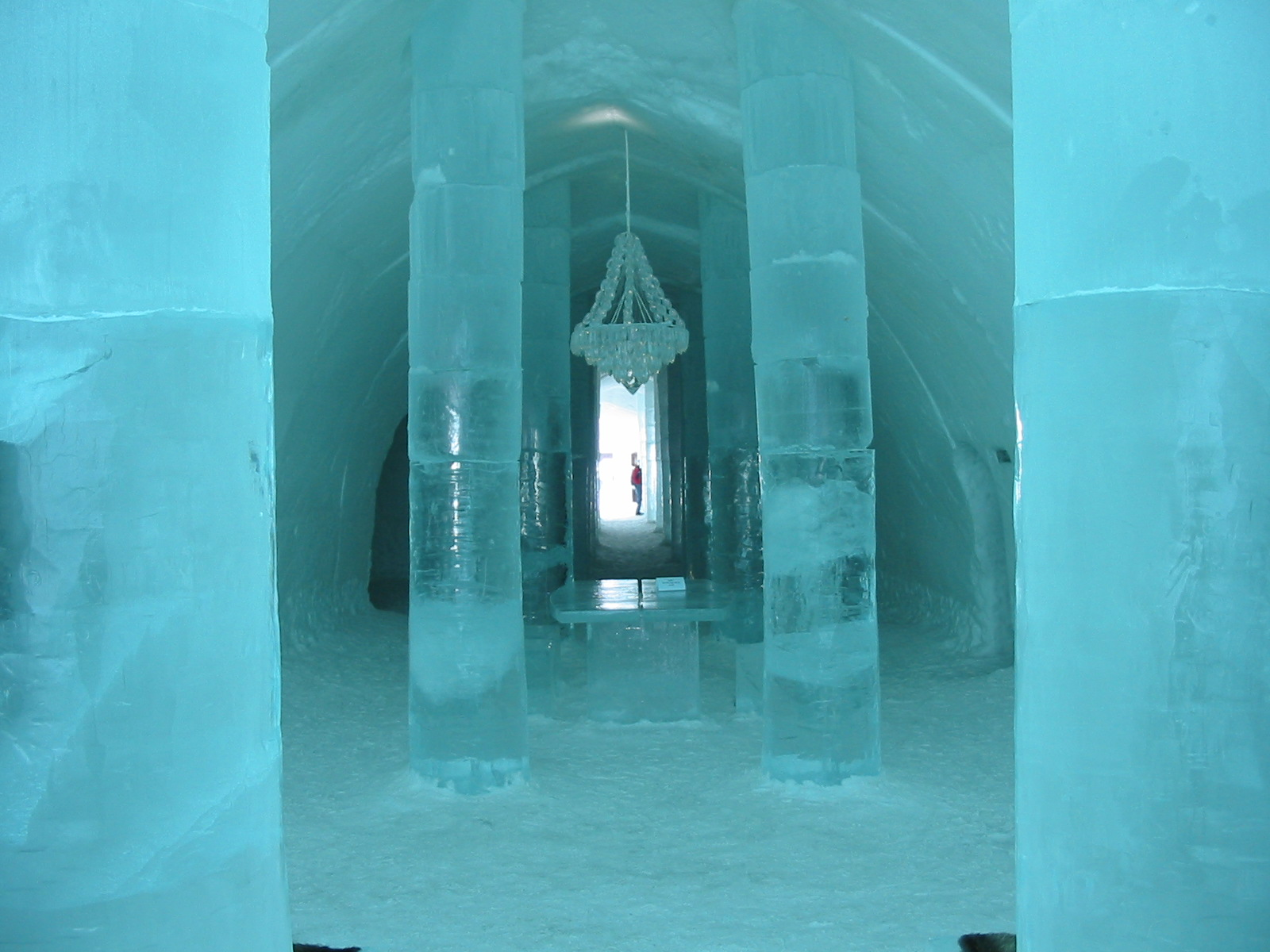
The Ice Hotel in Jukkasjärvi

In the winter, the Jukkasjärvi ice hotel is built every year near the northern town of Kiruna. Kiruna is also frequently used as a place from which to see the Aurora Borealis (Northern lights).

Tourists in Sweden's north in the winter often take trips in reindeer sleighs with Sami drivers, in dog sleighs, or on snowmobiles. It is also possible to ski, with downhill resorts at Åre and Vemdalen, and there are many cross country ski tracks throughout northern Sweden. Vasaloppet (in the beginning of March) is the oldest, longest and largest cross-country ski race in the world. Ice hockey is a popular sport in the winter. Many of the bays in the northern part of the country are frozen in winter, and it is possible to go ice yachting or ice skating on the ice. Many lakes are also frozen, so ice fishing (pimpelfiske) is quite common.

== Cities and towns ==
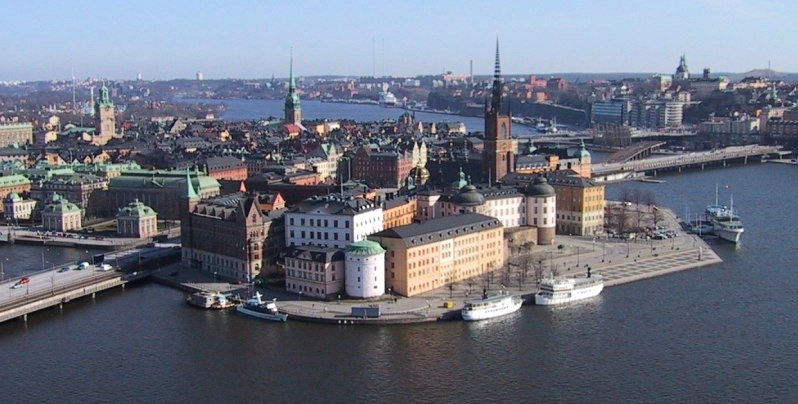
Gamla stan (Old town) in central Stockholm

Most cities and towns in Sweden are small compared to other European cities and towns. The largest city is Stockholm, with close to 900,000 inhabitants, followed by Gothenburg with 493,000 and Malmö with 270,000.

Stockholm has been Sweden's capital since at least the 14th century. It is Sweden's metropolis, the centre of the government and of the media. It has a waterfront adjacent to the Stockholm Archipelago; parts of Stockholm are preserved largely intact from older times.

Gothenburg is a relatively recently built city (dating from the 17th century). It is visited for its attractions and shopping opportunities.

Malmö has recently emerged in the eastern part of the Öresund Region, tied together with Copenhagen, Denmark, via the Öresund Bridge. During the last 15 years, Malmö has put more resources into culture; previously it had a reputation as a working class city. The twisted skyscraper Turning Torso and the main crane at the Kockums shipyard are landmarks, with the first being newer. Both Malmö and Gothenburg hosted the Uefa U21 European Championships during the summer of 2009. Malmö was also the host city of the Eurovision Song Contest 2013 and 2024.

Uppsala was the political and religious centre of Viking Age Sweden. It became the seat of the Archbishop of Sweden in 1167, with Scandinavia's largest church building Uppsala Cathedral inaugurated in the 1440s. In 1477 Uppsala University was founded as the first university in the Nordic countries, thus making Uppsala the center of education in Sweden.

Lund was part of Denmark until 1658, and had been the seat of Denmark's archbishop. In 1666, Lund was granted Sweden's second university, the Lund University; it is Scandinavia's largest.

== Transportation ==
The Swedish rail system is called SJ; it has slower-speed trains throughout the country and faster X 2000 trains connecting the major cities. Connection by rail is possible to Norway and Denmark; connections to Finland are by bus, due to rail gauge differences. It's possible to take Silja and Viking Line boats from Stockholm to Helsinki (Finland), Rostock (Germany) or Mariehamn on the Åland islands or the Wasaline ferry from Holmsund at Umeå to Vasa (Finland). The Scandinavian Airlines System and other airlines provides access by air for longer trips.

== See also ==
- List of museums in Sweden
- Scandinavian Mountains Airport
- Tourism in Denmark
- Tourism in Finland
- Tourism in Iceland
- Tourism in Norway
