= Jon-Lars =

Jon-Lars, Långhed
UNESCO World Heritage Site
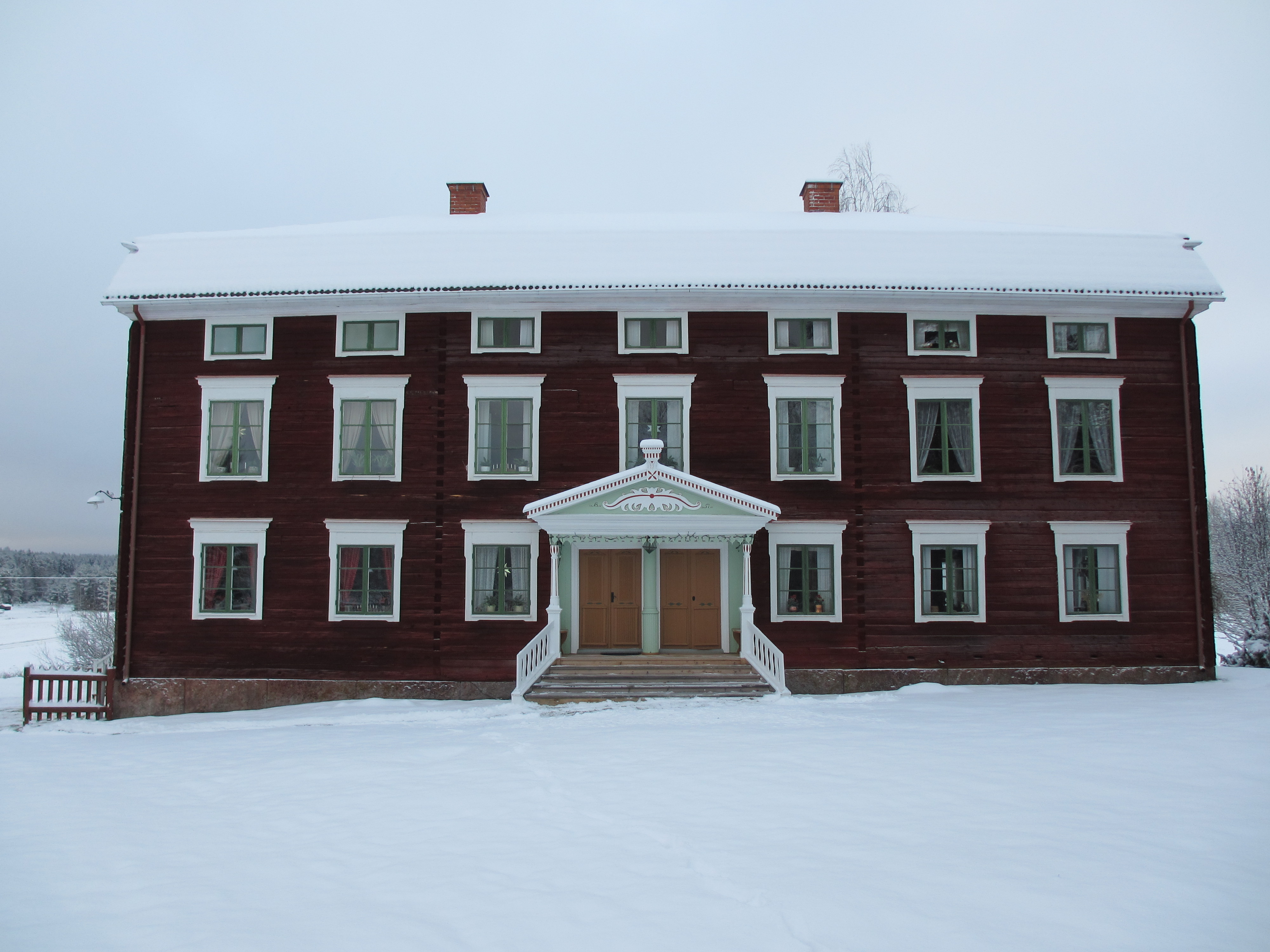

- Location within Sweden Gävleborg
- Location: Långhed, Alfta, Ovanåker Municipality, Gävleborg County, Sweden
- Part of: Decorated Farmhouses of Hälsingland
- Reference: 1282rev-004
- Inscription: 2012 (36th Session)
- Area: 1.97 ha (4.9 acres)
- Buffer zone: 139.4 ha (344 acres)
- Coordinates: 61°23′24″N 16°3′5″E

Jon-Lars is a Swedish farm located in Alfta in Ovanåker Municipality in the province of Hälsingland. It is one of seven decorated farms in Hälsingland that have been listed as UNESCO World Heritage Sites since 2012. It has also been classified as "byggnadsminne" in Sweden since 1994.

== History ==
The Jon-Lars farm has been in the same family since the 17th century. After a fire in 1851, it was completely rebuilt by two brothers, Anders and Olof Andersson. The main building, which has eighteen rooms and over fifty windows, was completed in 1857.

The Jon-Lars farm was designed to accommodate the families of the two brothers. Two separate dwellings share a reception room. The farm underwent renovations and modernization most recently from 1979–1980; however, the buildings were left mainly intact.

== Architecture and decoration ==
Like other decorated farms in Hälsingland, the Jon-Lars farm is built of wood. In addition to the main building, the site also includes a shed, a barn and other utility buildings. Most of these buildings have red-painted walls. The interior decorations of the main building are presumably the work of the traveling painter Dalmatian Svärdes Hans Ersson.

== Gallery ==
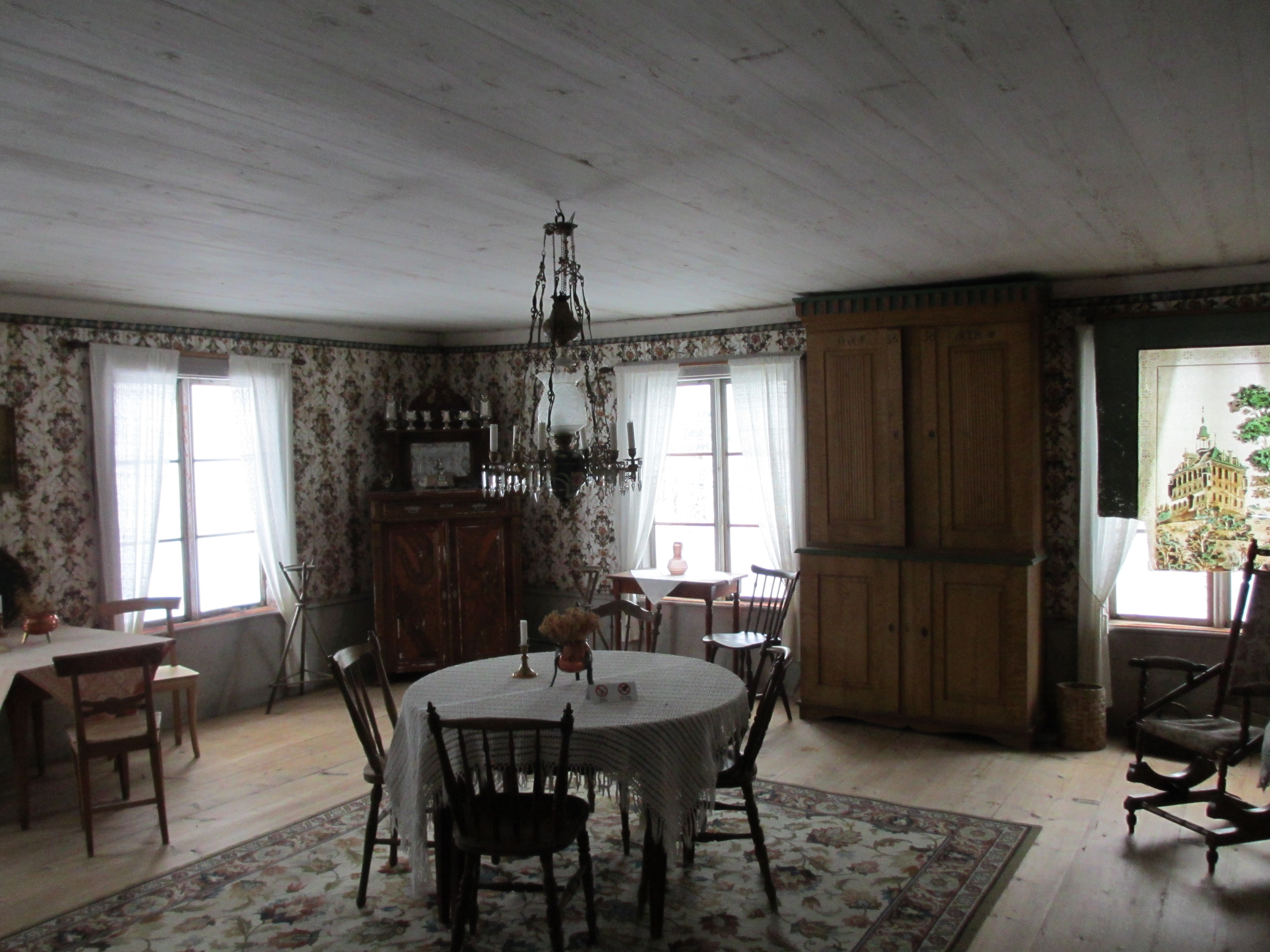
A living room.

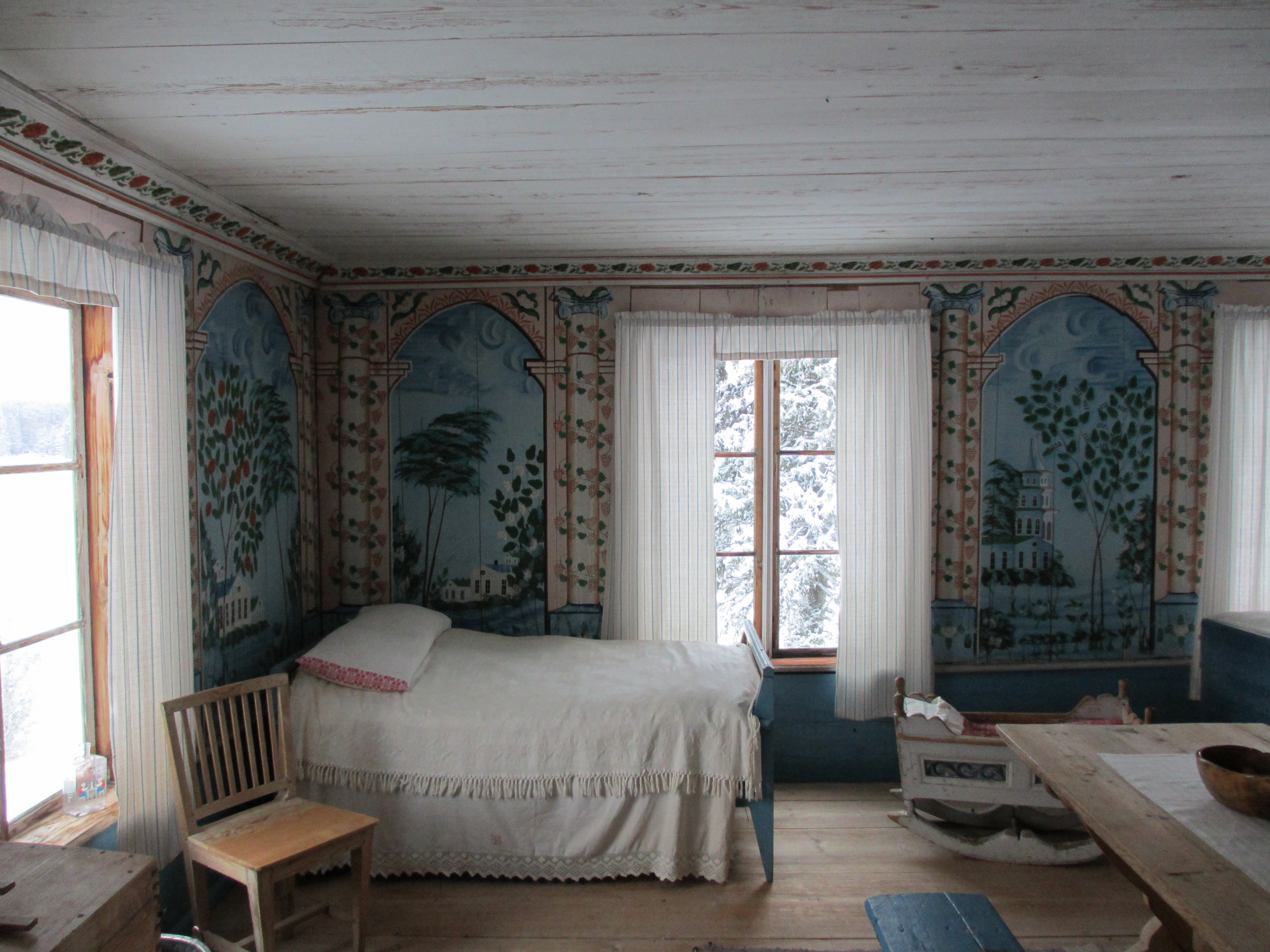
A bedroom.

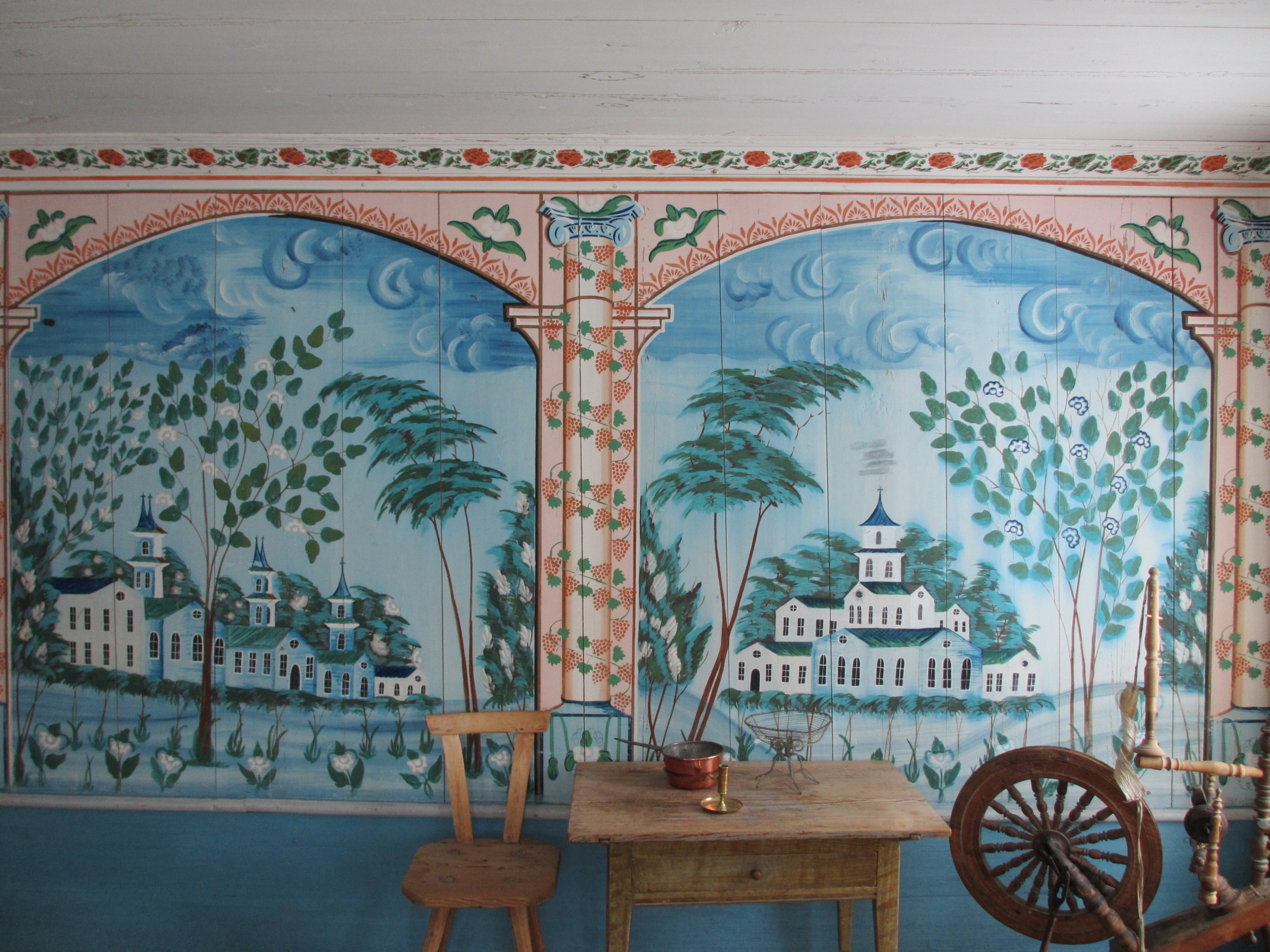
Wall paintings.

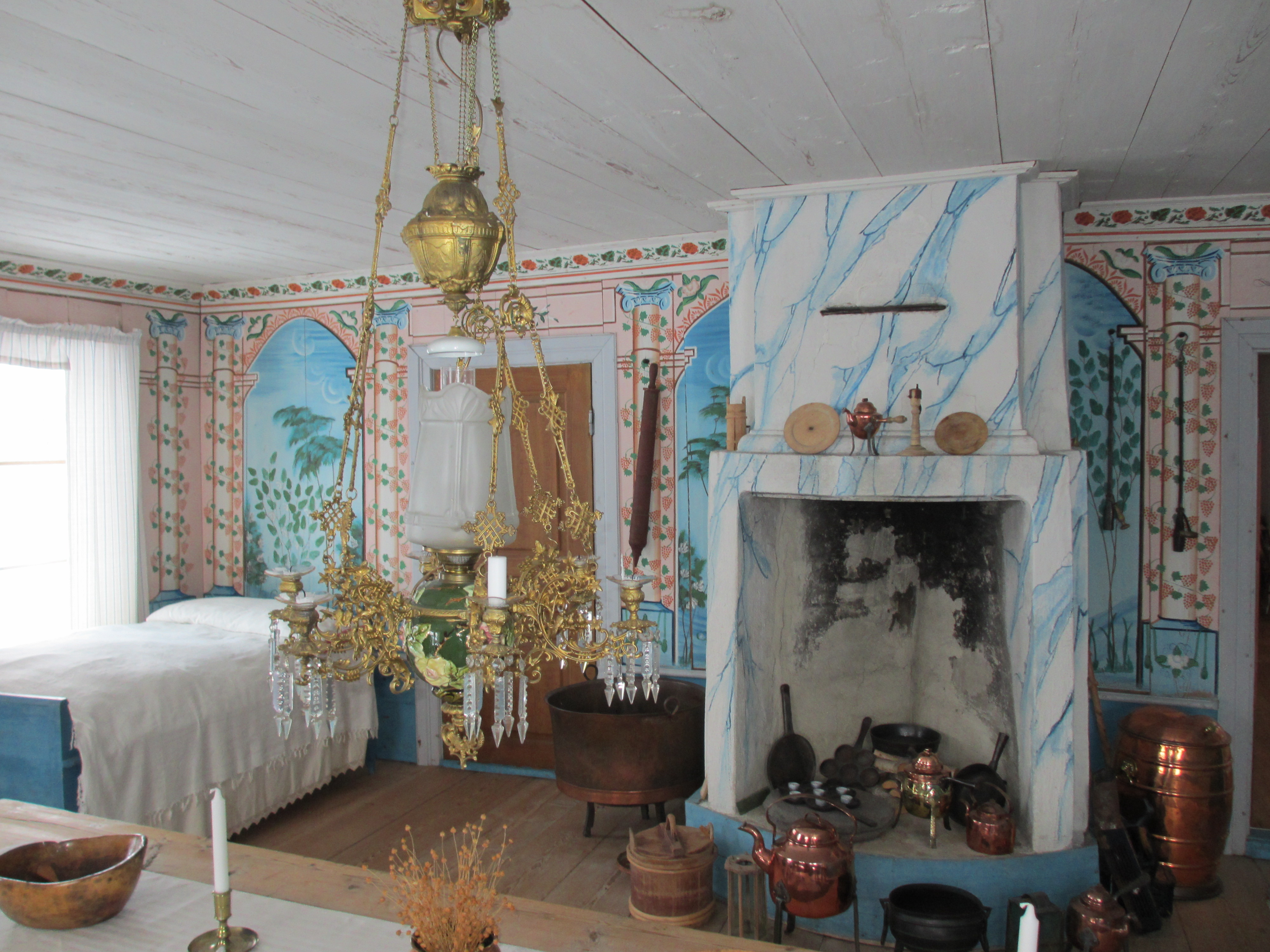
A bedroom.
