= Erik-Anders =

Erik Anders, Askesta
UNESCO World Heritage Site
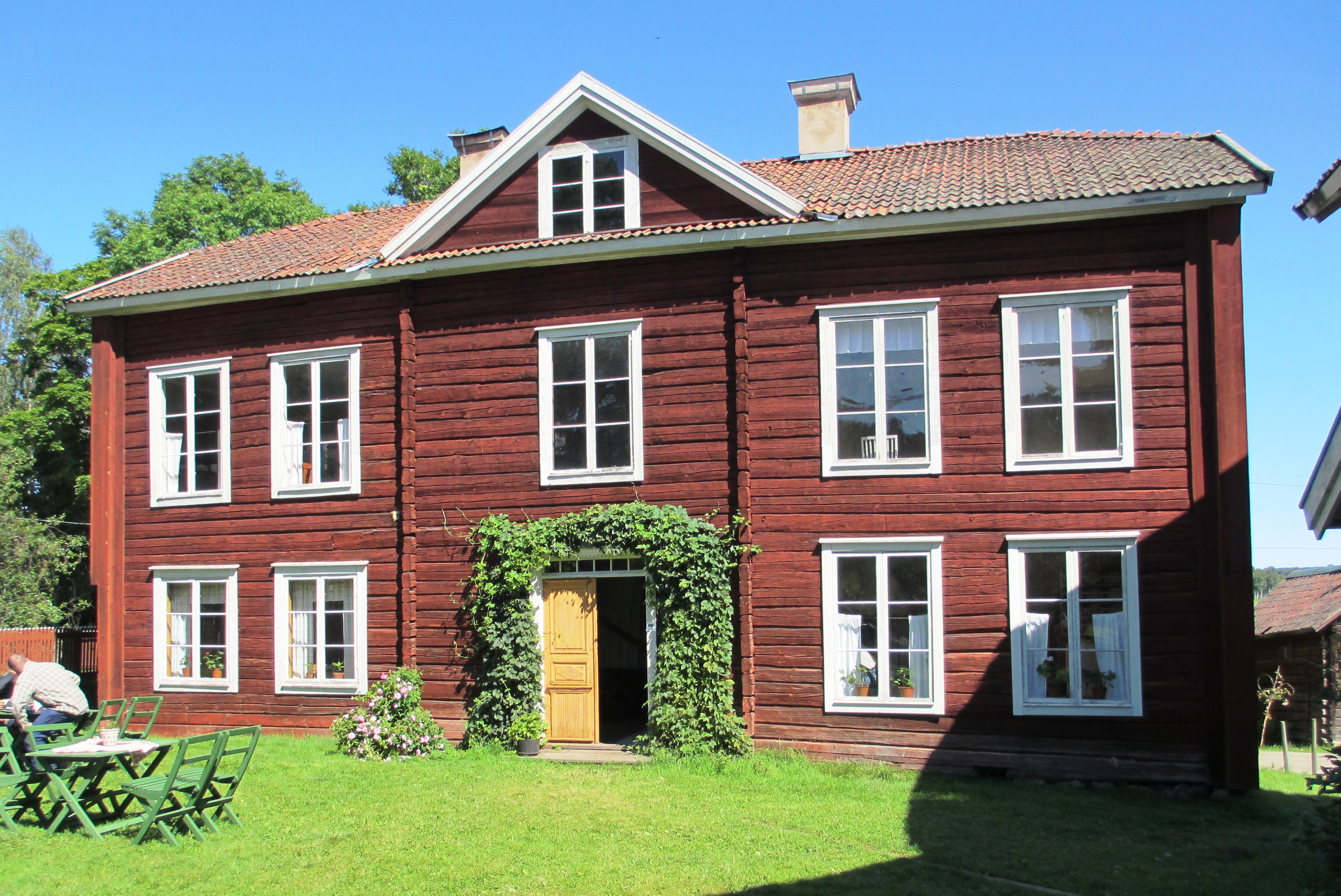

- Location within Sweden Gävleborg
- Location: Askesta, Söderala, Söderhamn Municipality, Gävleborg County, Sweden
- Part of: Decorated Farmhouses of Hälsingland
- Criteria: Cultural: (v)
- Reference: 1282rev-007
- Inscription: 2012 (36th Session)
- Area: 0.24 ha (0.59 acres)
- Buffer zone: 53.04 ha (131.1 acres)
- Website: www.erik-anders.se
- Coordinates: 61°16′20″N 16°59′36″E

Erik-Anders is a Swedish farm located in Söderala, in the municipality of Söderhamn and the province of Hälsingland. It is one of the seven decorated farms of Hälsingland which have been listed as UNESCO World Heritage Sites since 2012. At the national level, it is also ranked byggnadsminne since 2008.

== History ==
The farm owes its name to the peasant Erik Andersson (1788-1874), who rebuilt the main residence between 1813 and 1827. Its large reception room and its decorations testify to the wealth of the owner. The family subsequently suffered setbacks that threatened the maintenance of the farm: of the two sons of Erik Andersson, the elder emigrates to the United States while the cadet remains invalid after a horse accident. The property passed into the hands of several families, who set up several kitchens in the first half of the 20th century. The old ancillary buildings were also replaced in the 1910s by a single stable and barn building, among others. The farm buildings have been restored since 1993, in particular with regard to wall paintings and wallpapers.

== Architecture et decoration ==
With its elegant roof and large yellow painted facade, the main building had the appearance of a manor house. Over time, the yellow turned red. The interior decoration of the reception room, made by a group of Rättvik painters known as "Knutesmålarna", is also typical of the 19th century manor houses, with very clear colors.

== Gallery ==
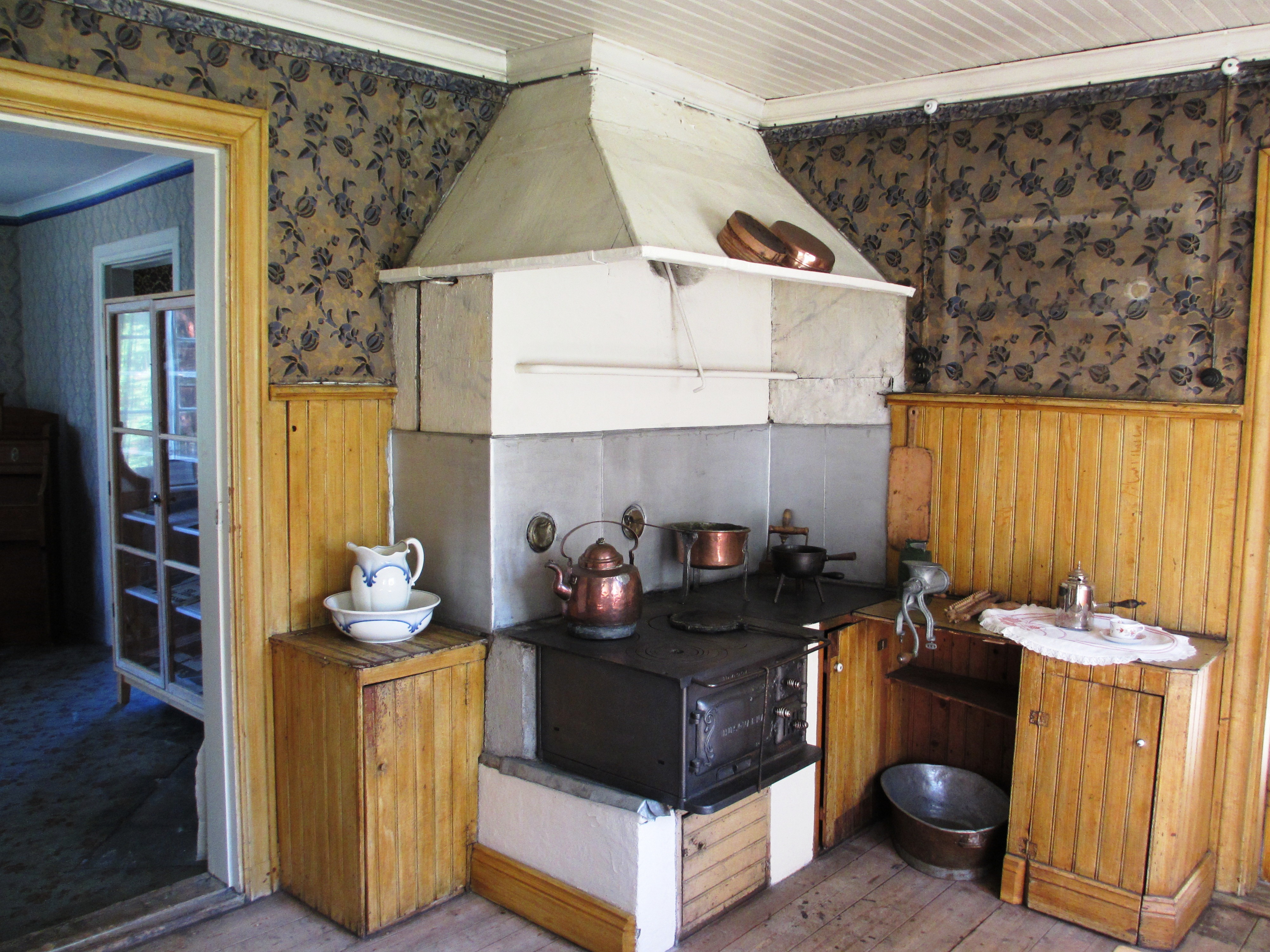
Inside the main building.

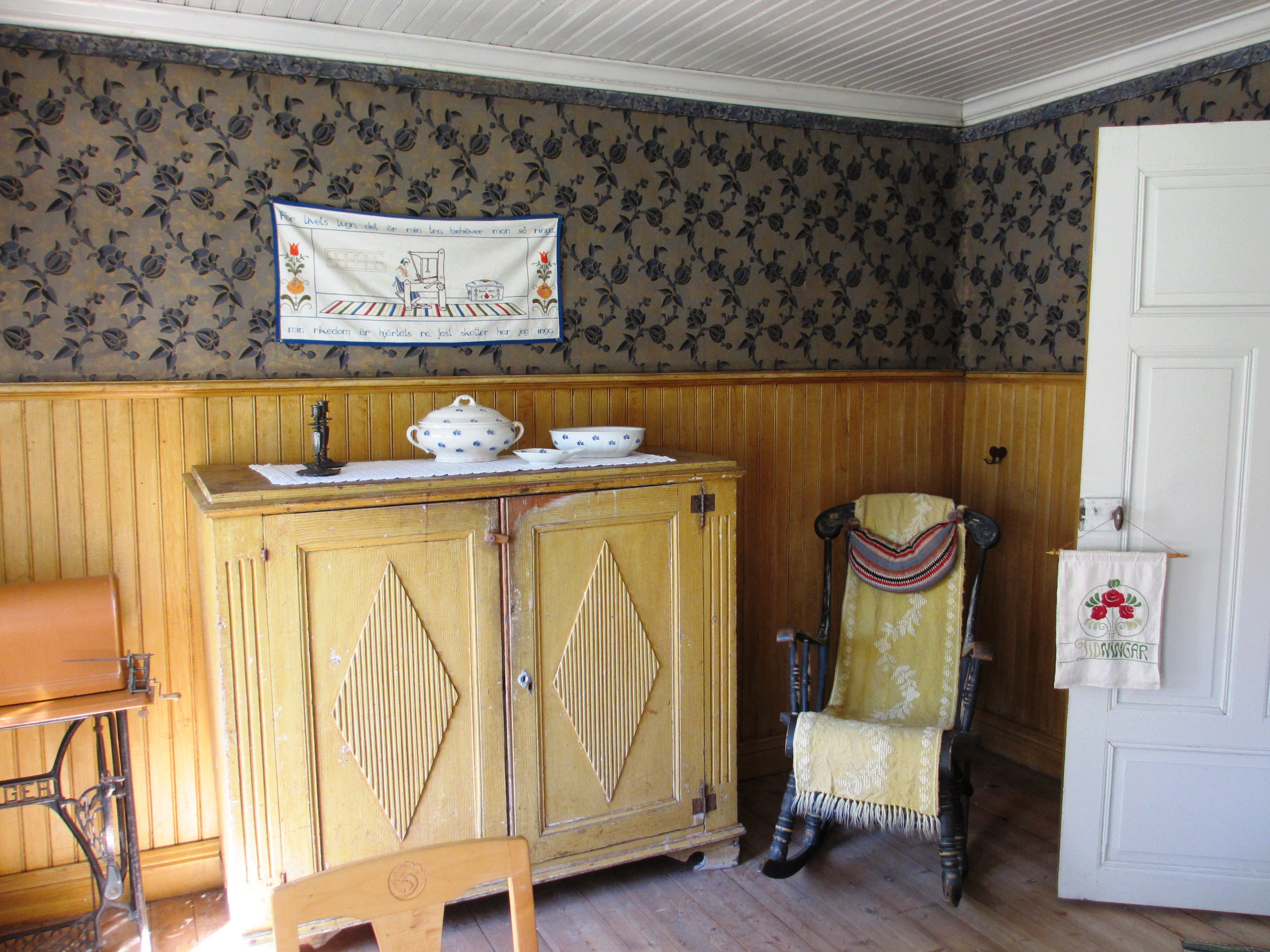
Inside the main building.

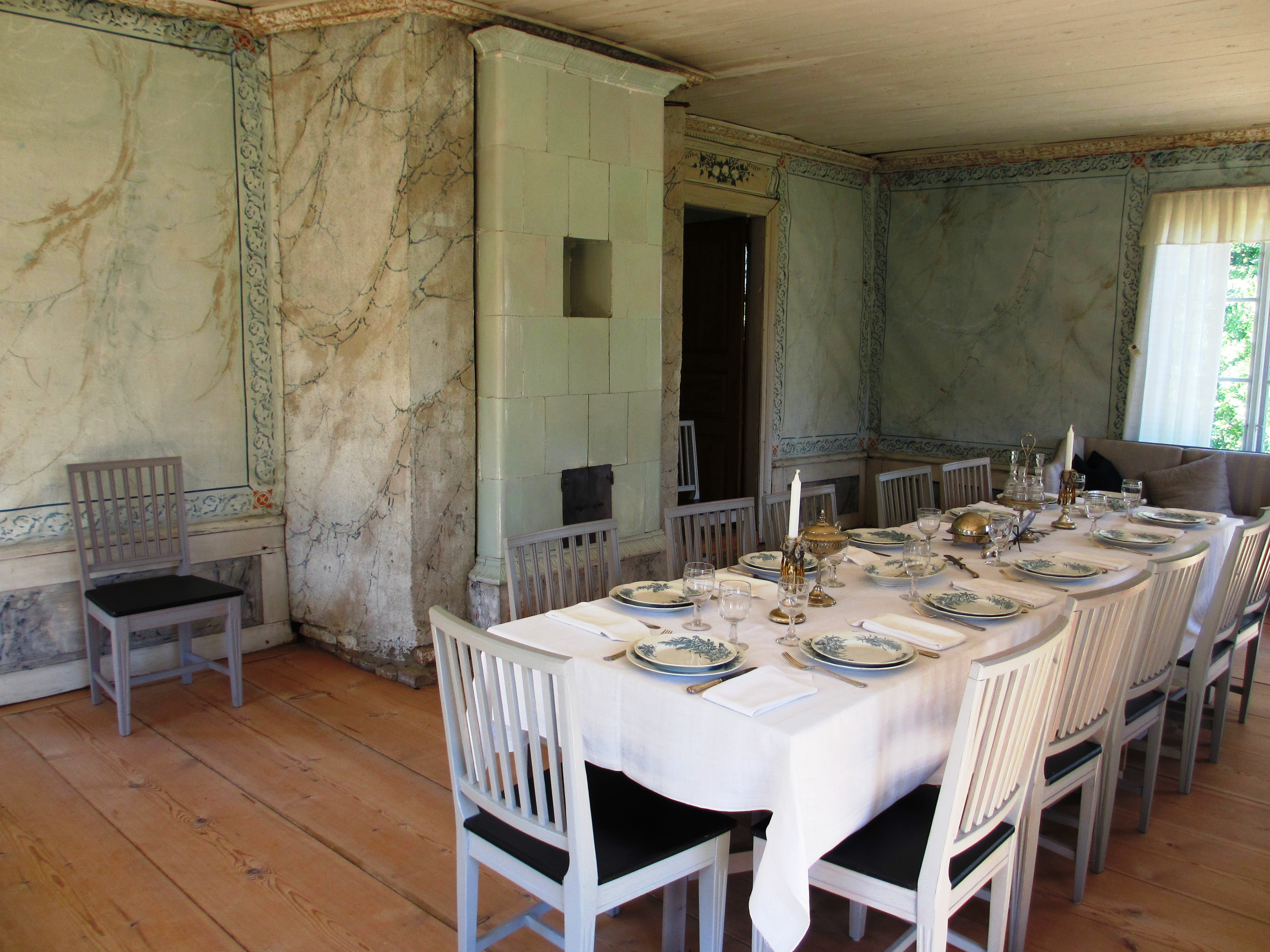
Inside the main building.

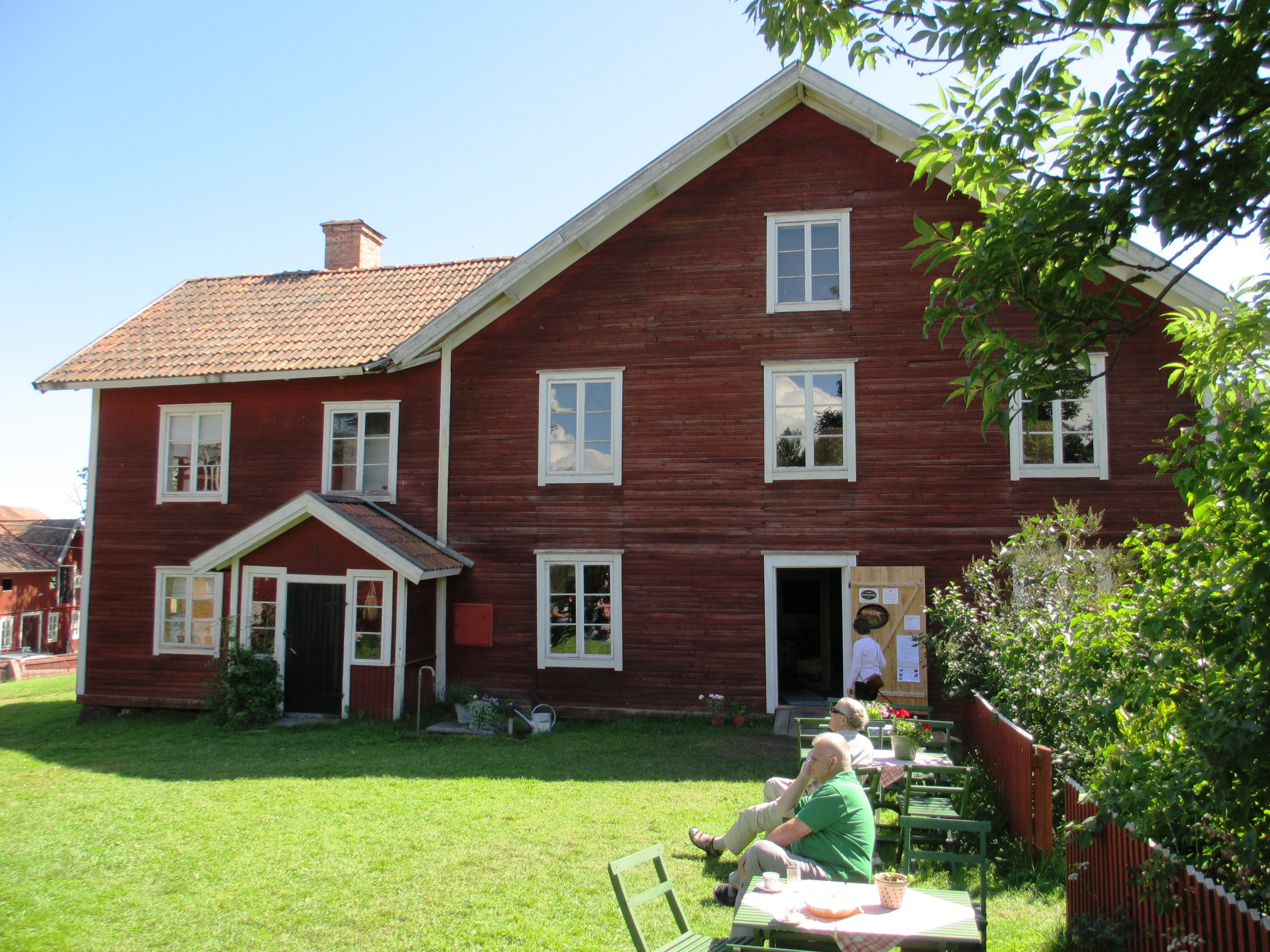
The utility building.

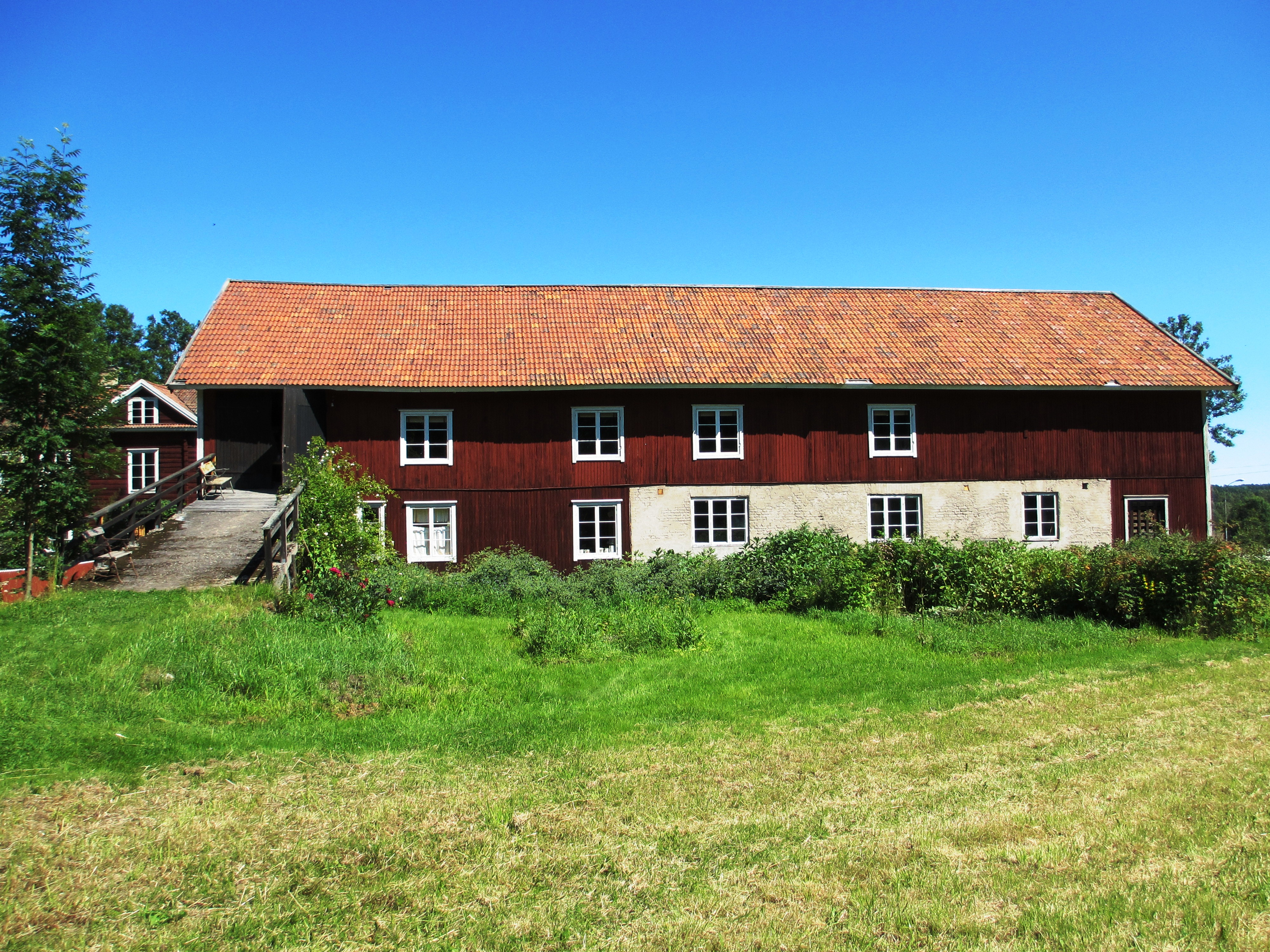
The utility building.
