= Bommars =

Bommars, Letsbo
UNESCO World Heritage Site
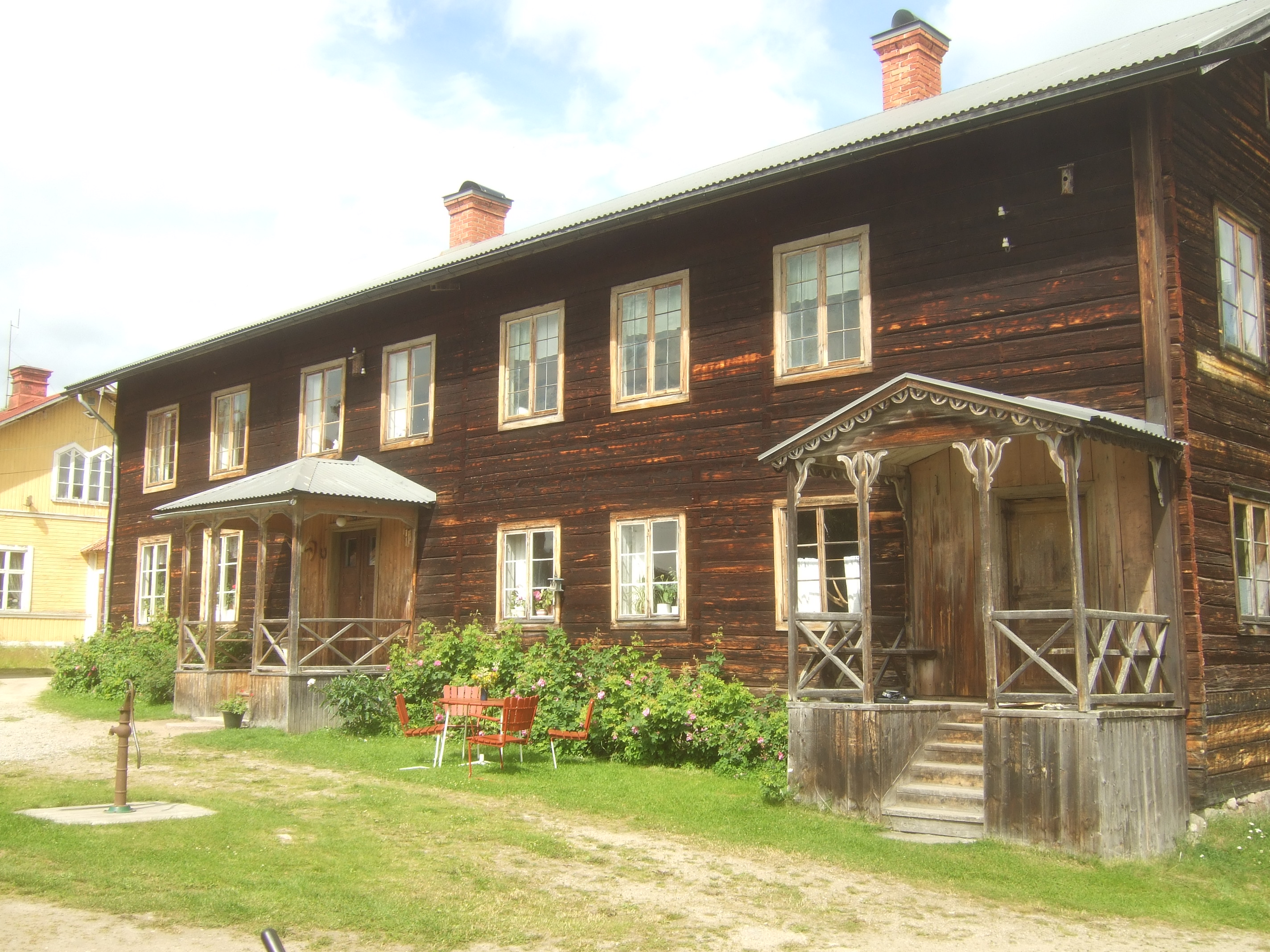

- Location within Sweden Gävleborg
- Location: Letsbo, Ljusdal Municipality, Gävleborg County, Sweden
- Part of: Decorated Farmhouses of Hälsingland
- Reference: 1282rev-006
- Inscription: 2012 (36th Session)
- Area: 1.72 ha (4.3 acres)
- Buffer zone: 3.25 ha (8.0 acres)
- Coordinates: 61°55′49″N 15°52′40″E

Bommars is a Swedish farm located in Letsbo, in the Ljusdal Municipality of Hälsingland. It is one of seven Decorated Farmhouses of Hälsingland which have been listed as UNESCO World Heritage Sites since 2012. At the national level, it has also been classified as a Listed buildings in Sweden since 2008.

== History ==
The farm appeared for the first time in an inventory of the year 1542 under the name of Oppigården, owned by the peasant Påvel Olof Rolfsson, but the buildings acquired their present form in the nineteenth century. The two residential buildings, Sommarstugan ("Summer Residence") and Vinterstugan ("Winter Residence"), were built in 1848 for Sven Johansson and his wife Gölin Jonsdotter, who inherited her father's farm. However, the couple preferred to live at the Sven farm in Sörkämsta. It was not until 1887 that the farm became permanently inhabited by the couple's grandson, Sven Persson. It acquired its current name in the 1930s, when it became the property of the brothers Enno and Lars Johansson who bore the collective nickname "Bommapojkarna". It continues to be a private property.

== Architecture ==
Besides the residential buildings, the farm includes a barn with a shed, an attic and a forge. All these buildings are made of wooden logs. The interior of the residential buildings has wallpaper and painted frescoes depicting castles like Ekebyhov or the Rosersberg Palace.

== Gallery ==
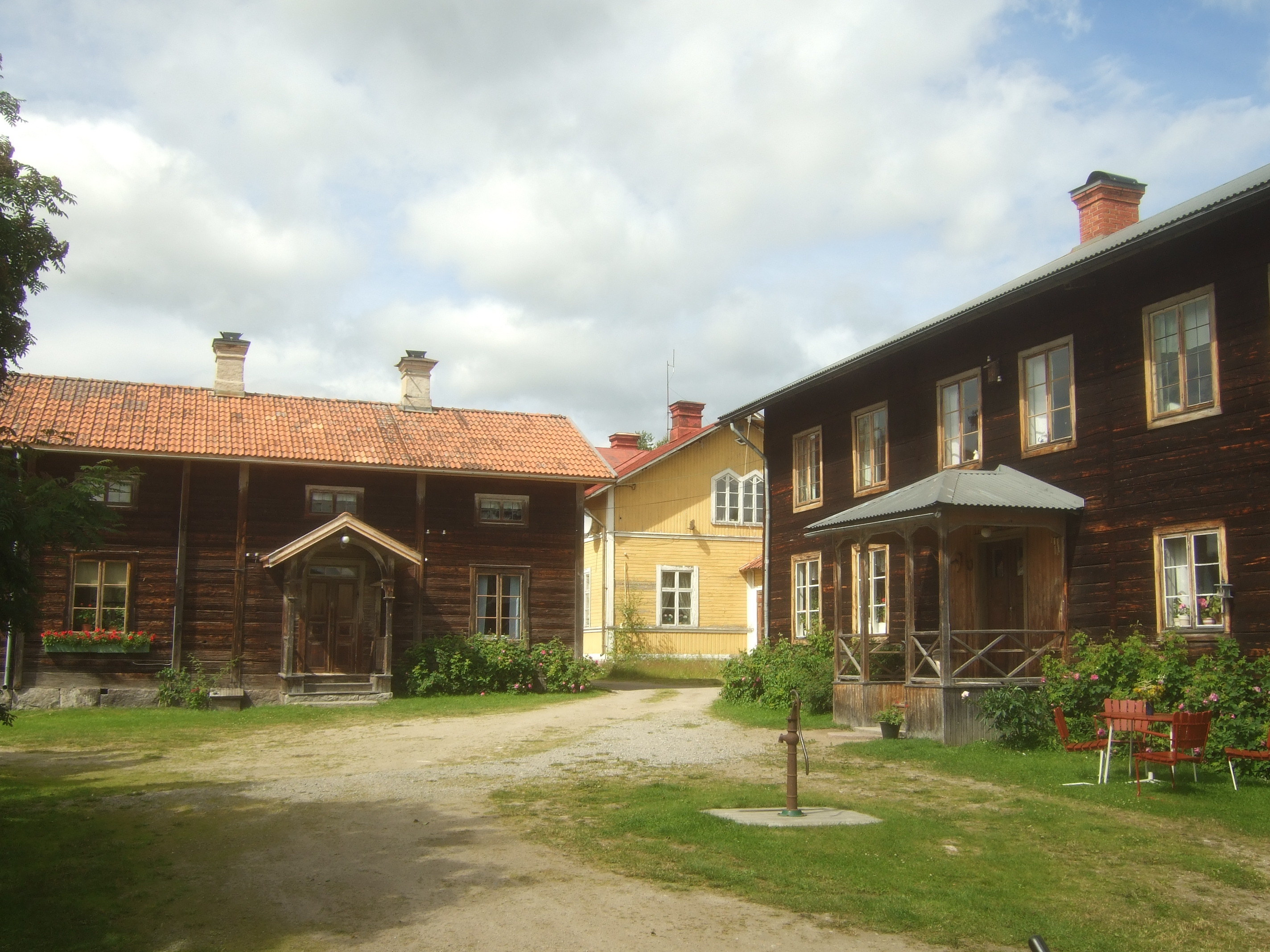
Sommarstugan and Vinterstugan.

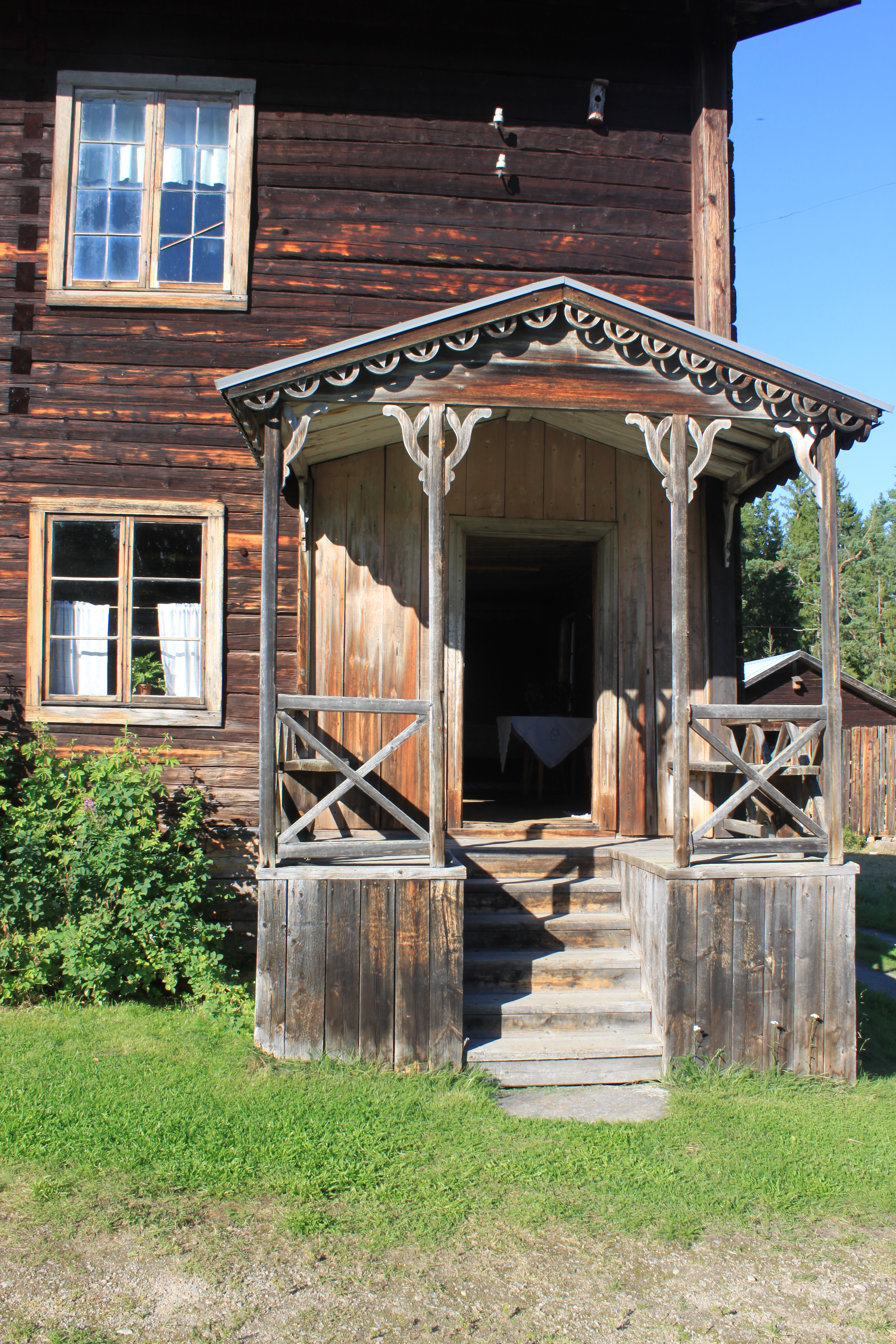
A decorated porch.

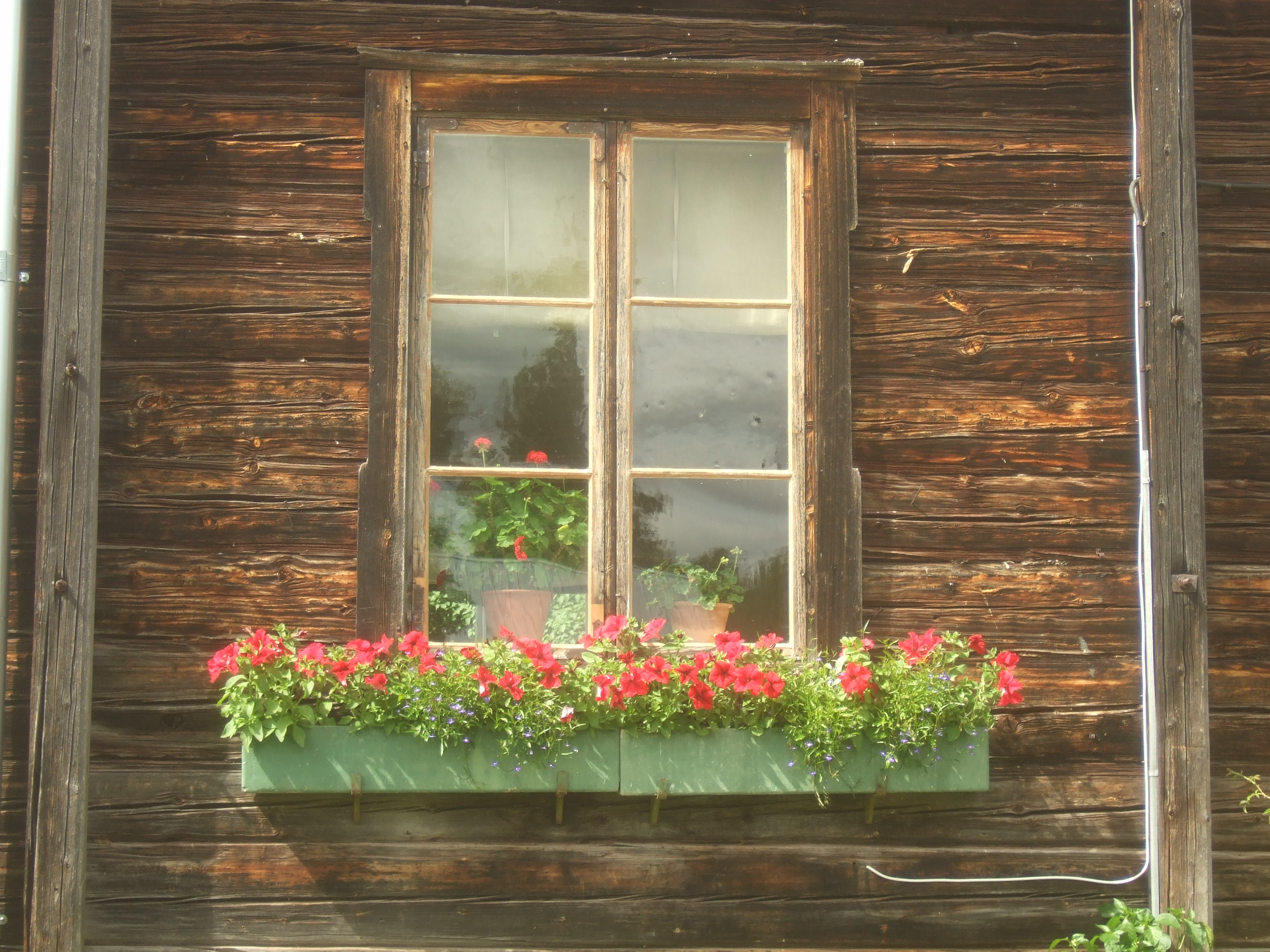
One window of Sommarstugan.

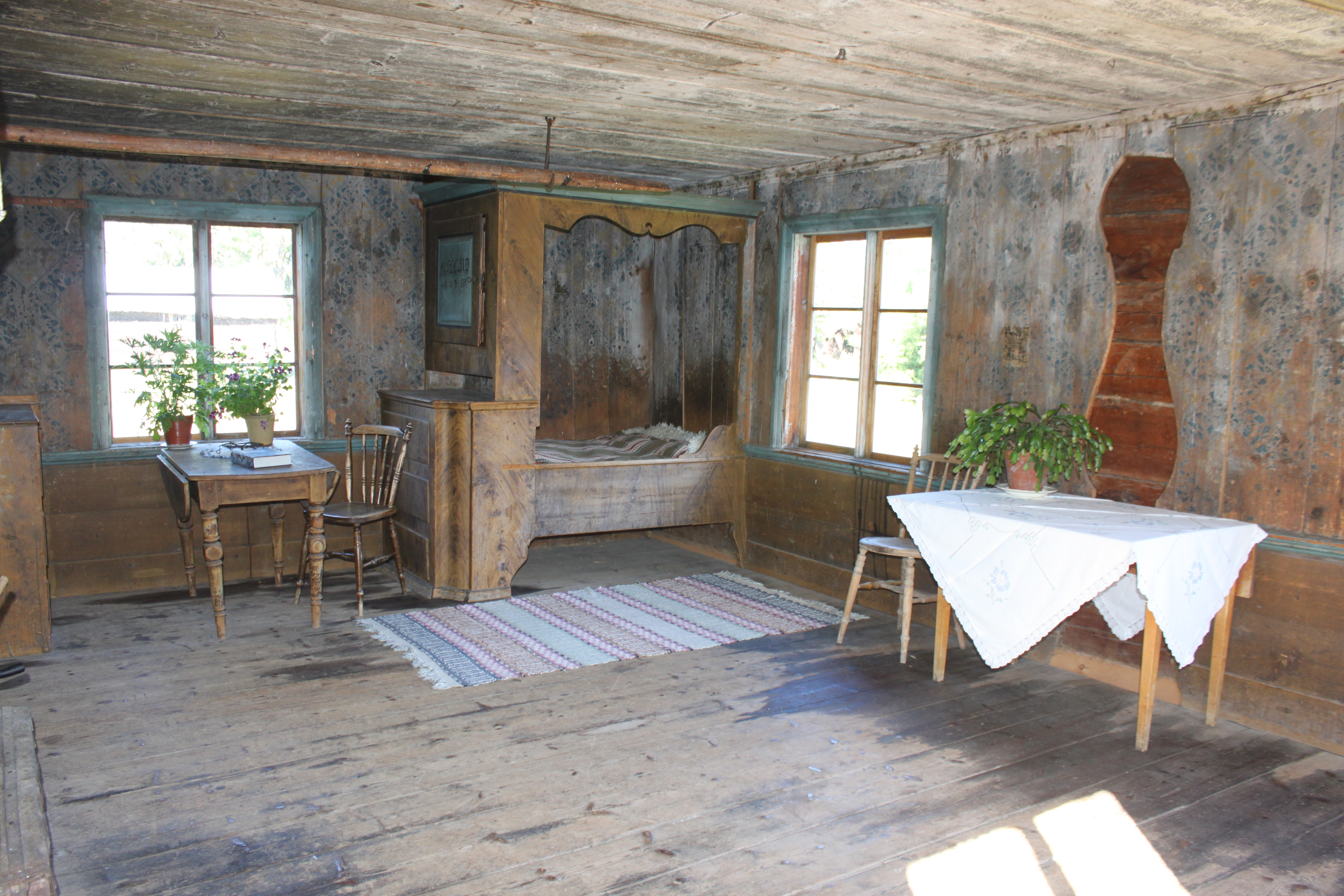
The interior of a kitchen.
