= Fågelsjö =

Village in Sweden

Coordinates: 61°48′N 14°38′E

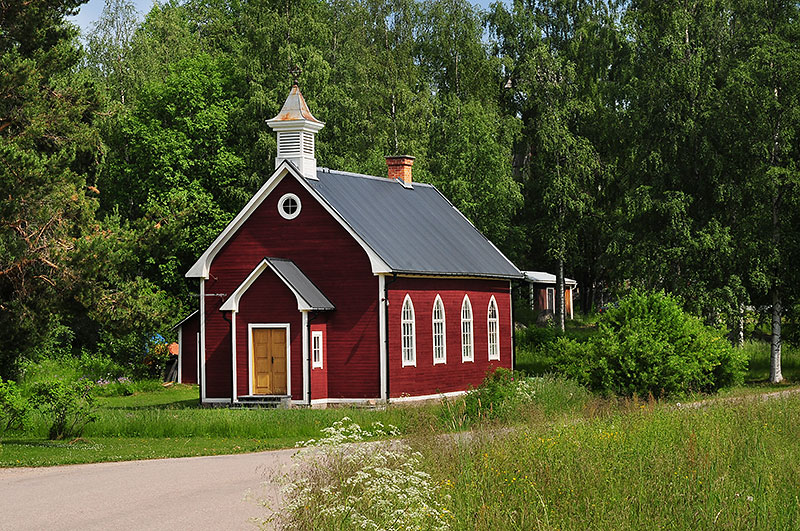
Former Mission Covernant Chapel in Fågelsjö

Fågelsjö is a Swedish village in the Gävleborg County, Dalarna. It is also called Bortom Åa, meaning 'Beyond the river'. Known for its folk museum, Gammelgården, the village was established by second generation immigrants from Finland around 1700. It is one of the UNESCO World Heritage Site farms.
