= Decorative painting in Hälsingland =

Folk art tradition focused on decorative interiors in Hälsingland, Sweden

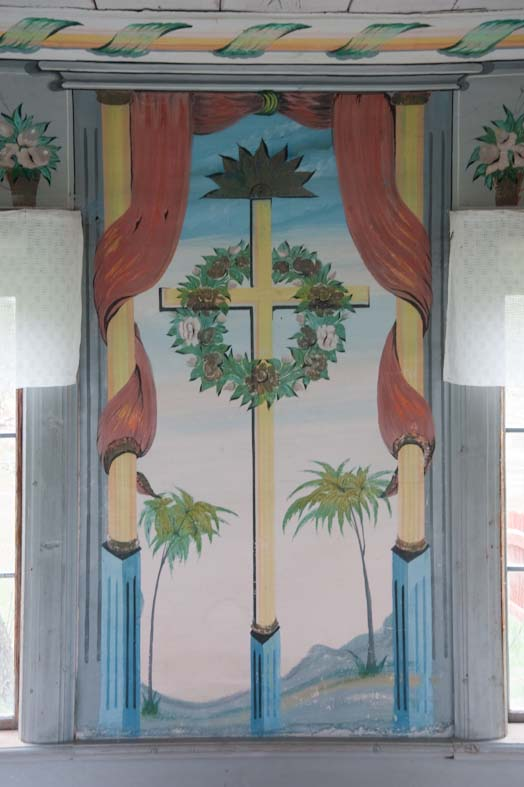
Wall painting at the Kristofers farmhouse in Järvsö, by artist Anders Ädel (1854).

Decorative painting in the Hälsingland region of Sweden (Swedish: Hälsingemålning, "Helsingian painting") has been practiced as a folk art tradition since the 16th century. Employed as a means of interior decoration in Hälsingland farmhouses, the tradition has been practiced by mostly self-taught and now forgotten artists. Wall paintings were usually applied with distemper paint after covering the hard wooden surface with coarse linen. Decorative painting of furniture was also a ubiquitous manifestation of the art style. Religious themes were predominant until the 18th century, after which the selection of motifs became more diverse. The first reliable attributions of preserved interiors to named artists concern works from that time period. During the early 19th century, classically trained artists started participating in, and influencing, the style, while an influx of folk artists skilled in the Dalcarlian tradition made their mark in the region. The practice of decorating walls with the assistance of stencils was also introduced as a more economical alternative to fashionable, but still very expensive, printed wallpaper. By the end of the 19th century, the folk art tradition had degenerated and went into decline.

Hälsingland is considered one of the premier areas for Swedish folk art due to the substantial number of preserved works. Most of the preserved decorations from the period have been found near the Dellen lakes, as well as the river valleys of Ljusnan and Voxnan. The golden era of decorative painting in Hälsingland, between 1800 and 1870, was vital to the designation of the Decorated Farmhouses of Hälsingland as a World Heritage Site.

== History ==
=== Background ===
Hälsingland has an abundance of arable land and has good flax cultivation, linen production, and woodlands that provide quality timber. These economic factors have commonly been given as reasons for the corresponding abundance of richly decorated Hälsingland farmhouses. In contrast, studies of folk art traditions in other areas of Sweden have shown that an abundance of decorative painting is not necessarily dependent on the accumulation of wealth. The oft-cited importance of flax and linen as economic enablers of the art style has also been questioned.

=== The early period ===
Several fragments of 16th-century works painted on linen weave have been preserved. In fact a disproportionally large part of all Nordic painted tapestries stemming from the 16th century have been discovered in Hälsingland. This is mainly because of the Alfta find unearthed in 1964, after the floor boards at the Hans-Ers farmstead were removed during renovation. The find consists of a number of tapestries of different makes and unknown origins. One of the more exquisite pieces retells the story of the Book of Esther with the characters in contemporary 16th-century vestments. On the back side the tapestry displays an older pattern, possibly from the 15th century. Another weave from the middle 16th century depicts women as allegorical representations of mercy, prudence, and justice.

The farmers of Hälsingland would by the end of the 16th century furnish their homes with richly decorated painted furniture. At the time, most Swedish farmers had no painted furniture at all. Archival documents from 1500 to 1601 reveal at least 20 people titled "painter", indicating that their services were in high demand.

=== Decorative painting during the 17th and 18th centuries ===
The bulk of traditional painting done during the 17th century has been lost, with only fragmentary remnants preserved. These fragments display a breadth both in choice of motif and style, with grey, black, and red colors predominating. On a farm in Ljusdal parish, a biblical motif was discovered, in this instance painted in distemper on linen weave. From fragments of text contained on the tapestry, it is the story of king Solomon, but the characters are again dressed in accordance with 16th century Swedish fashion. Wall painters of the era would apply paint directly onto the wooden surface, although preparations, including filling the crevasses between the logs with a specific species of moss and then covering it with scraps of linen, were common. The preparations were completed by covering the wall with a layer of white distemper. After the underpainting had dried, the artist could begin working. Several clergy houses in the province still used traditional tapestries to dress the walls as a means of decoration.

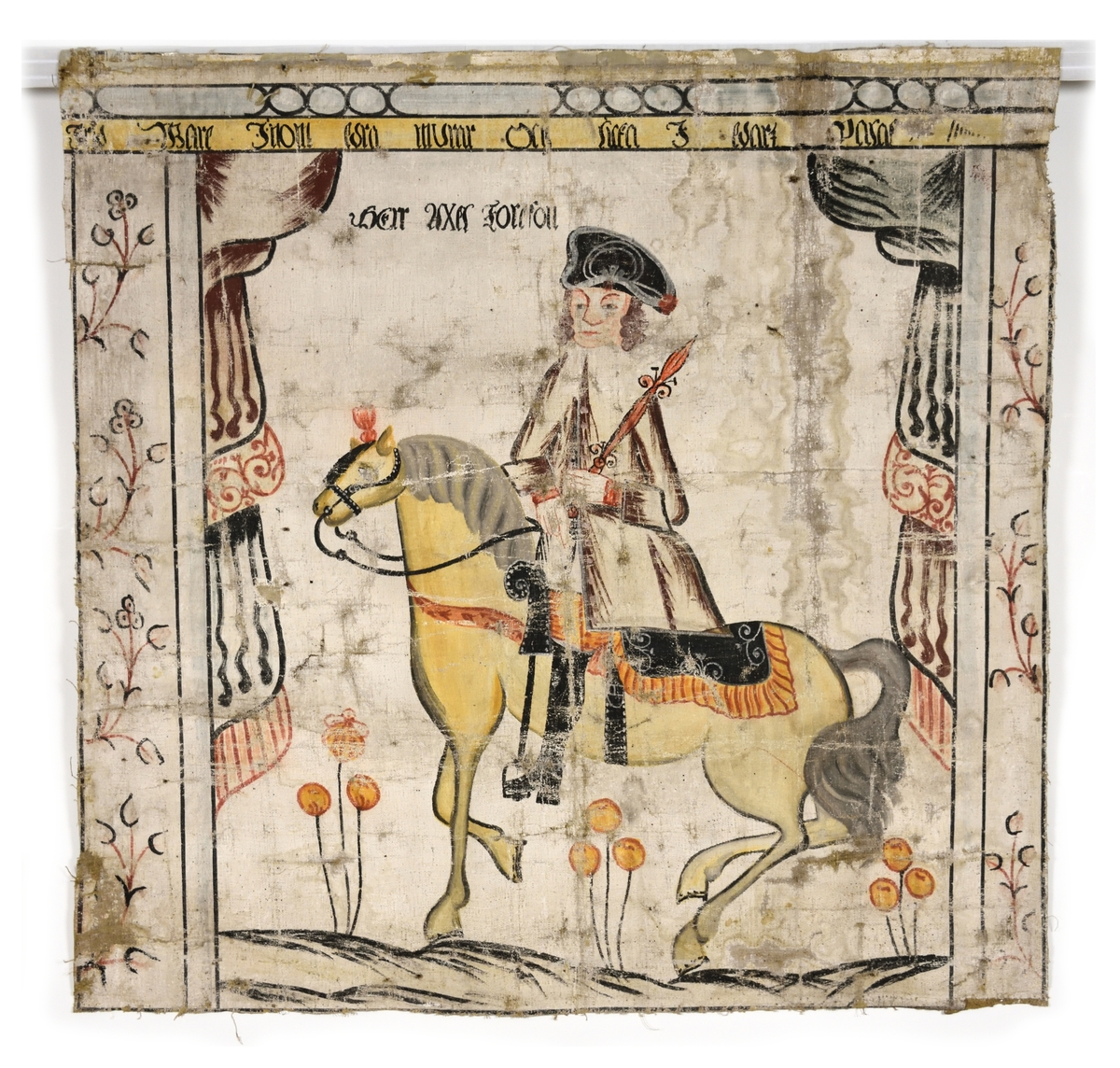
Horseman by Erik Ersson (1768).

The biblical theme was still strong during the 18th century. Alongside people, horses became a favored component of the composition. In the decorated rooms of the homestead, it was customary to paint all surfaces including walls and ceilings. For both, white distemper was still used for the base layer. Wall painters would separate the surface into sections with borders of painted grape wines and columns. Apart from horsemen and other characters, the sections boasted flowers and fruit in grand urns. Ceilings were adorned with grape wines, laurel leaves, and bountiful flower rosettes.

For most of the 18th century the color palette was limited to pigments that could be sourced naturally. Soot or coal for black, chalk or lime for white, ferrous earth for red, and from rare local earth deposits a yellow tint was manufactured. By the middle of the 18th century, Prussian blue was introduced and remained popular throughout the 19th century. The earliest proper attributions connecting various local artists with their works are from the early and middle 18th century. Among these are Gustaf Reuter, a corporal serving in Delsbo company, and Erik Ersson, from Källeräng in Delsbo parish.

=== The golden age of Helsingian painting during the 19th century ===
During the 19th century, the folk-art style came under the influence of formally, classically trained artists for the first time. Both Jonas Wallström and Olof Hofrén were educated artists proficient in landscape painting who drew columns, where especially Hofren's were true to the classical style. In figurative painting there was a migration in the choice of motif away from the omnipresent biblical scenes. Another novelty was the popularization of distemper-based marble imitations in the foyers of the homesteads.

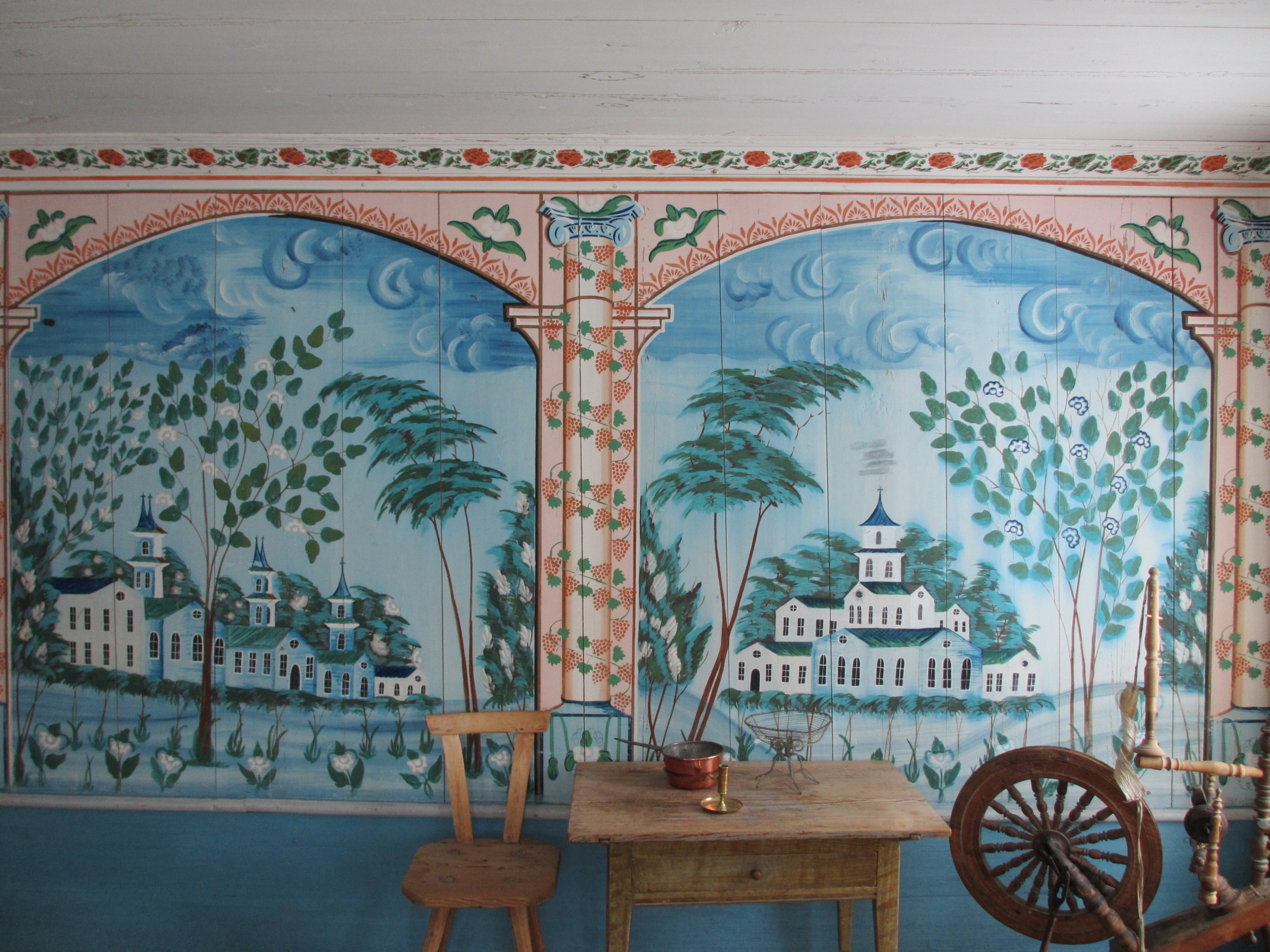
Typically blue wall art at Jon-Lars in Alfta (mid 19th century).

During the early 1770s Dalarna suffered bad harvests, compelling painters from the province to journey eastward in search of work in prospering regions. Several Dalcarlian painters were active in Gästrikland province from the 1770s onward and during the 19th century their colorful style was in high demand among the rich peasants of Hälsingland. As paper became increasingly available in the 19th century the painters could work from home, in Dalarna, and have the works delivered to their buyers, which facilitated the spread of the Dalcarlian style. The Dalcarlian painters who were active in Hälsingland would adjust their choices of both motifs and color palette to some extent, in order to meet the expectations of their new customers. Dalcarlians usually signed their work. Due to this practice their presence in the province has historically been overplayed, compared to the local Helsingians who would often forgo signing their art.

At the turn of the 19th century, printed wallpaper started competing with, and complementing, the folk art tradition. These wallpapers were mostly block printed. Initially, Helsingian farmers were content to confine the use of wallpaper to a single room, usually the small chamber of the "parstuga", and at the beginning of the century even this custom was a rare one. Printed wallpapers are considered to have inspired stencil based wall-painting, which was introduced during the 1830s by Jonas Wallström. Contracting a stencil painter was considerably cheaper than purchasing actual printed wallpaper. The Helsingian tradition was relatively advanced in terms of both stencil-based patterns and their combination with figurative motifs, in comparison to other Swedish folk-art traditions.

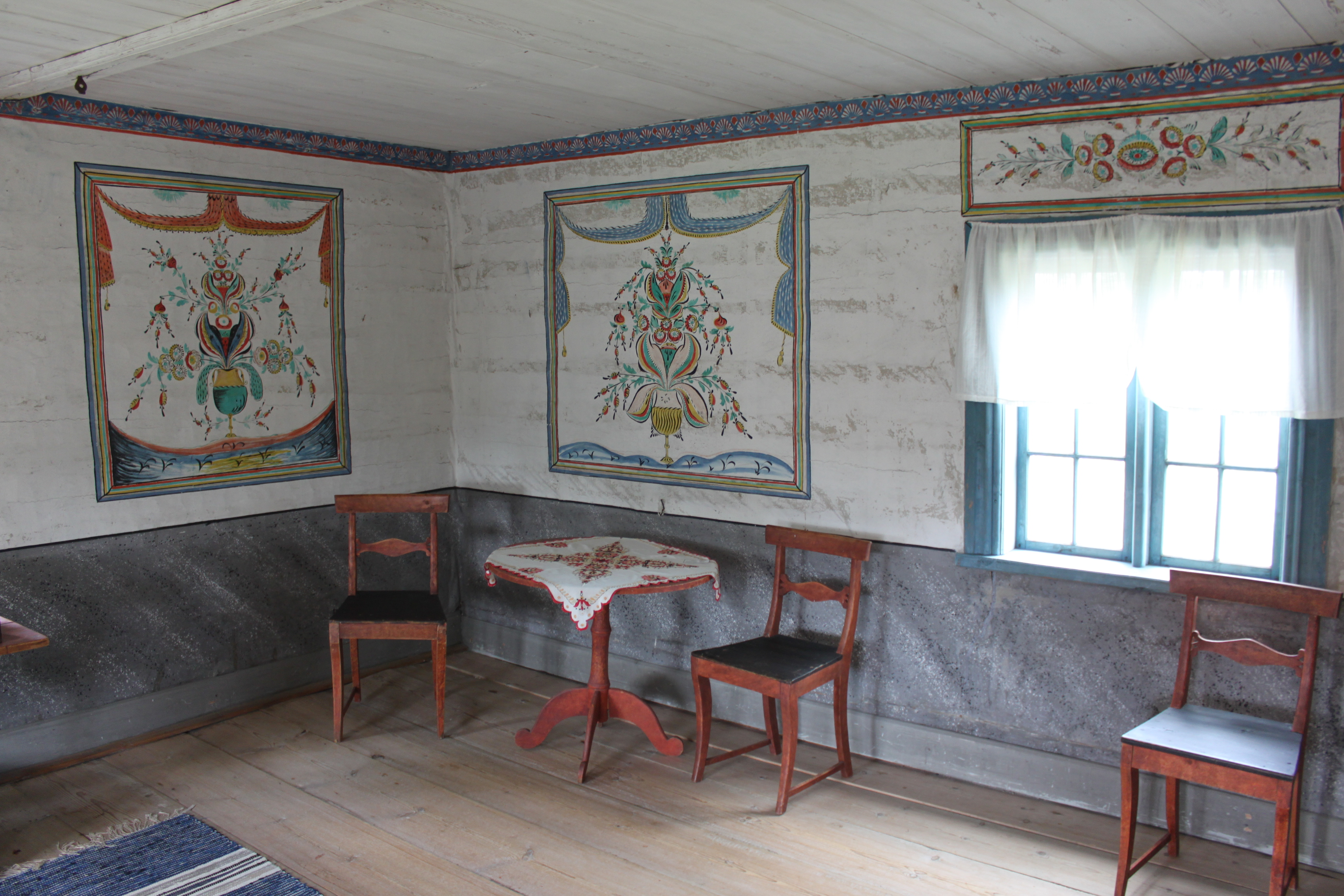
Dalcarlian artist Bäck Anders Hanssons works at Fågelsjö Gammelgård (1856).

As access to wallpaper improved during the 1840s and 50s, its use became widespread and more than one room was commonly decorated with printed wallpaper. In spite of this, there was a corresponding increase in demand for decorative painting. It was not until the latter half of the 19th century that printed wallpaper would supplant painted decorations, and the use of framed paintings also became usual. The replacement of open fires with cast-iron stoves during the 1860s allowed for the use of wallpaper in the farmhouse kitchens. From the 1870s onward, falling prices enabled even the lower classes to afford wallpaper. From a broader perspective, increasing industrialization and influences from modernism had been eroding local traditional customs. Toward the end of the 19th century the tradition of Helsingian painting had degenerated and went into decline.

== The artists ==
The names of most Helsingian painters, as well as the creators of most preserved interiors, have been lost to history, as a result of the tradition of their not signing their work. Still, a number of artists from the 18th and 19th centuries are known by name. The lack of signatures has led to many of the earlier attributions coming into question, due to dubious analysis and having too keenly favored well-known painters. Scientific investigations have demonstrated that cooperation between artists was exceedingly common, which further complicates later attributions.

Several known painters were soldiers or at least fathered by soldiers. Until 1846 guild membership was mandatory, but only for painters active in towns and cities. In the countryside the socken council was authorized to approve local craftsmen. Church records indicate that many painters were poor and died with hardly a penny to their name. Most known painters are men, but there are documented examples of women participating, such as Gustaf Reuter's wife and son working on Delsbo church, while Gustaf himself was away on a military campaign. Some of the Dalcarlian painters' wives contributed, among them Anna Hansdotter, the wife of Bäck Anders Hansson.

Decorative painting as a trade was frequently passed down within families; the know-how could also be acquired by marrying into a family of artists. Some recurring patterns, such as acanthus ornaments and techniques for marbleizing, seem to have been informed by the tastes of the nobility, and the sacral ornaments of church interiors. Many a church painter had in turn adapted their style from the decorations of churches on the European continent, where they had travelled in search of employment. Painters fraternized, cooperated, and learned from each other as they plied their trade, and, in conjunction with their customers' expectations, local styles, and variations of such, arose and prevailed. These styles have in modern times been described using common art history terms: the Karl Johan-style of Arbrå parish, the Gustavian style of Ljusdal parish, and the Baroque of Forsa and Delsbo parishes. Over prolonged periods, prominent individuals or groups of painters would influence the local style. Traveling painters could in turn be inspired by such peculiarities, widening their influence as they wandered the countryside in search of employment.

=== Gustaf Reuter (1699–1783) ===
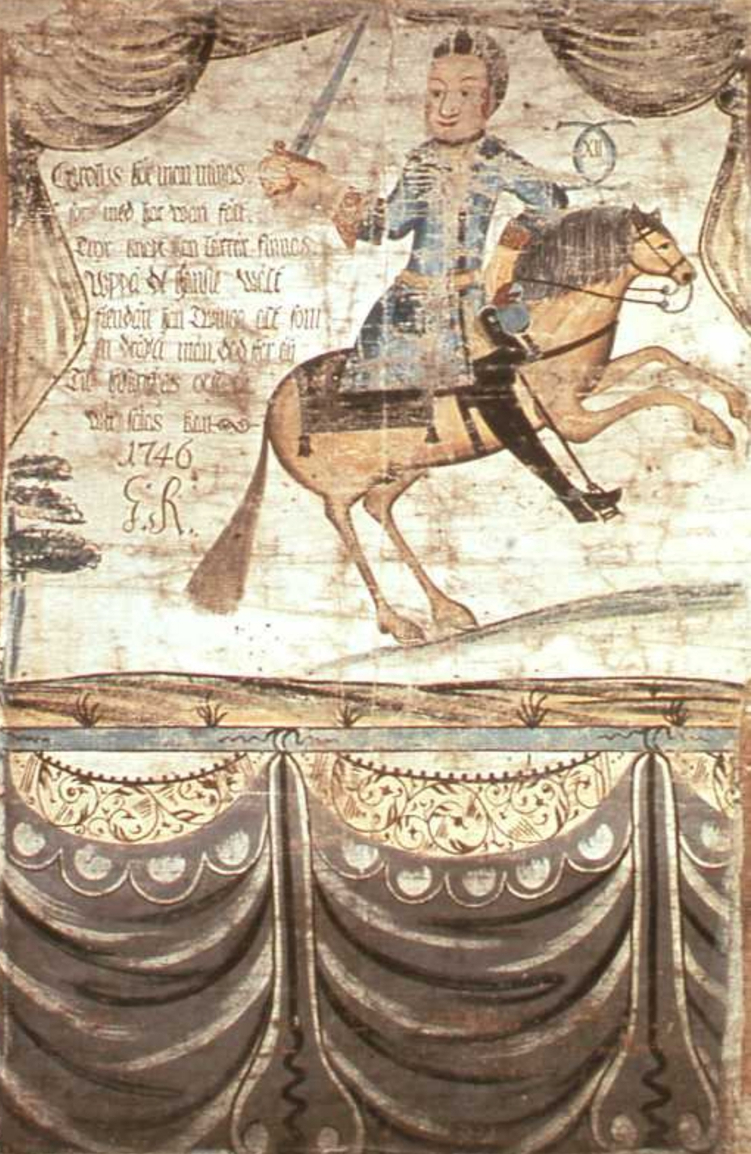
Charles XII by Gustaf Reuter (1746).

Reuter was the man behind the stylized decorative painting style popularized in the Dellen area during the 18th century. As a soldier of the Hälsinge Regiment he was frequently away on military campaigns. The style has been characterized as Baroque with elements of renaissance. He would depict both biblical characters and military leaders on horseback. His usual method for composing wall sections used painted frames of vines, draperies, flowers, and fruits. Yellow, red, and brown dominate the palette, and the contours of his characters are sharply demarcated in black. Throughout his career, Reuter would associate with a number of younger painters, retroactively dubbed the "Delsbo School", for safeguarding the stylistic choices of their local tradition. In contrast to many others, Reuter would regularly sign his production, significantly facilitating discernment between the works of the master and his students. Preserved interiors by Reuter are kept at Delsbo Forngård, Bjuråker Forngård, the Hälsingland Museum in Hudiksvall, the Ljusdal museum, and in the Delsbo homestead at the Skansen open-air museum in Stockholm.

=== Paul Hallberg (1734–1789) ===
Hallberg was one of the earliest artists with formal training. After attending art school in Stockholm he moved north to Hudiksvall, where he made a name for himself, primarily as a church painter, but he would also decorate farmhouse interiors, Vallingården in Växbo is a prominent example. Dominated by shades of brown and red, Hallberg's color palette is a somber one. His many church interiors were based on iconic designs by great masters. His most famous pupil, Jonas Åkerström, would begin his career as an interior painter of farmhouses, and end up as a court painter to Gustav III. Hallberg himself worked on at least a dozen churches in northern Hälsingland, including the altarpiece in Delsbo church, finished in 1764.

=== Jonas Hertman (1755–1804) ===
Hertman was born and raised in Bollnäs and, according to oral tradition, was an apprentice of local artist Sven Hult in Söderhamn. His wife would come along for Hertman's journeys and paint with him. Hertman's religious motifs include the baptism, the passion, and the ascension of Jesus, which according to antiquarian Ingemar Svensson contains elements influenced by cultural shifts that presaged the 19th century christian revival. (Note: Specifically pietism and the Moravian revival.) Through the course of his career he would move from Naïve Baroque towards Rococo. Many paintings include details from copper engravings reproduced in a Swedish edition of Heinrich Müller's Himmlischer Liebeskuss. Hertman also earned his keep as a watchmaker. His works have been preserved in farmhouses in the parishes of Alfta, Arbrå, Bollnäs, Mo, Ovanåker, and Rengsjö. Hertmans interpretation of the Lebenstreppe is displayed at Schols farmhouse in Näsbyn and his passion of Jesus is shown on the walls of the Bollnäs cabin at Skansen.

=== Jonas Wallström (1798–1862) ===
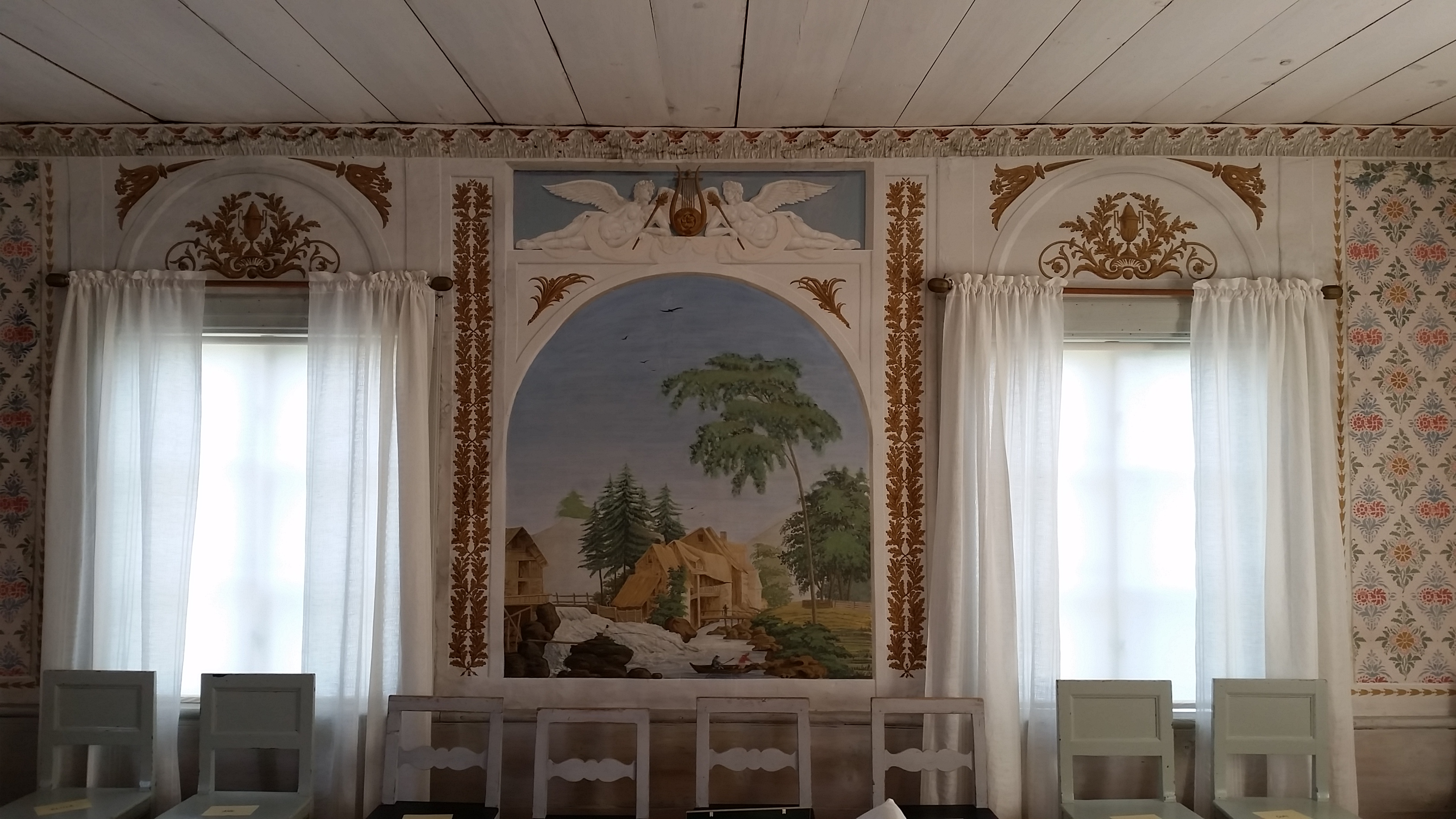
Gästgivars main hall by Jonas Wallström (1840s).

Wallström was born in Vallsta and took a new surname, after his birthplace. Between 1814 and 1821 he lived in Hudiksvall working as an apprentice of artist Anders Winberg. He continued as a journeyman at Gustaf Söderberg's workshop in Stockholm (1823–1831) and most likely received tutoring from tapestry painter Carl Fredric Torsselius. As he returned to the Vallsta area in the 1830s he quickly became the most distinguished stencil painter in the middle Ljusnan river valley. Wallström completed several interiors consisting of free-hand motifs and stencil painting. His typical style includes gilded frames, colonnettes, and ornamentation in Karl Johan style, with expertly-drawn and rich stencil patterns. The motifs between these ornaments are usually romantic landscapes or pastorals. The decorated interiors of Gästgivars in Vallsta, completed by Wallström, have attained World Heritage status. Other works by him are kept at the Hälsingland Museum, Renshammar in Bollnäs, Wallins in Växbo, Lars-Pers in Hov and at Arbrå Fornhem.

=== Other prominent Helsingian artists ===
- Erik Ersson (1730–1800) – who painted Delsbo Forngård, Forsa Forngård, the Hög church, and whose interiors are on display at the Hälsingland Museum in Hudiksvall, and the Delsbo homestead at Skansen.
- Jöns Månsson (1769–1867) – carpenter and furniture painter active in Forsa parish, with preserved works on display at Ystegårn in Hillsta and in the Hälsingland Museum's collections.
- Björ Anders Hansson (1775–1837) – who painted at Ystegårn in Hillsta and at Mårtes in Edsbyn.
- Anders Ädel (1809–1888) – whose works are on display at the Ljusdal Museum, and the farmhouses of Kristofers (Note: Part of the World Heritage Decorated Farmhouses of Hälsingland.) in Järvsö and Engbergs in Stavsäter.
- Olof Hofrén (1813–1856) – who was mostly active as a church painter in Ångermanland, but also decorated Hälsingland farmhouses, including, most likely, interiors at Renshammar in Bollnäs.
- The Knutes family – who decorated the Erik-Anders farm in Asta and Västerby in Rengsjö.
- Blåmålarn ("The blue-painter") – who painted at Pallars in Långhed.

== Furniture ==
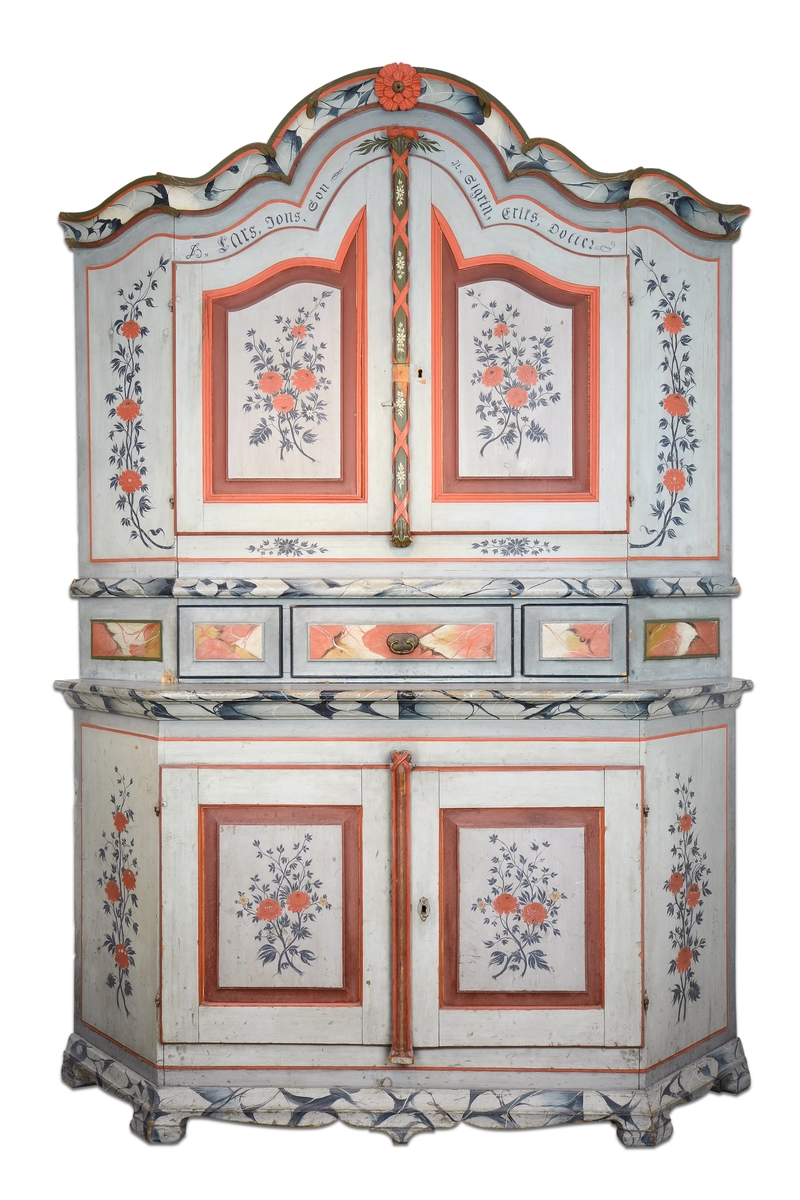
Armoire from Forsa parish by Jöns Månsson (1800).

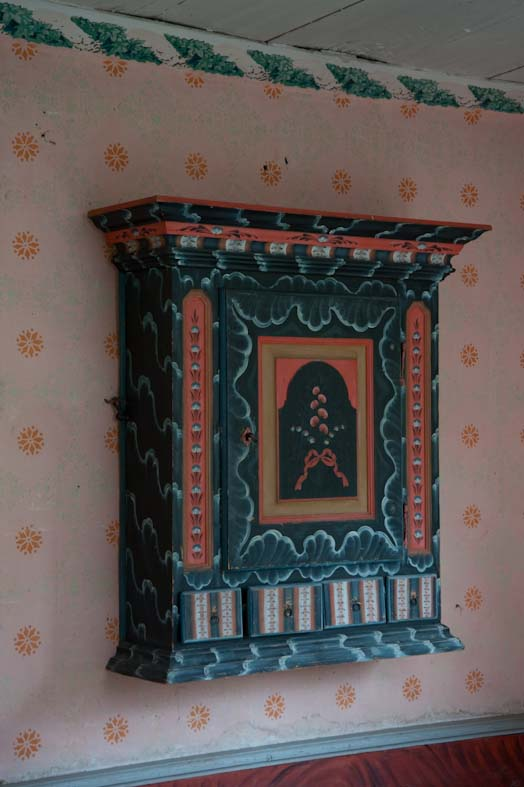
Järvsö style hanging cupboard with "cloud marbleizing" at Kristofers (19th century).

The creation and decorative painting of free standing furniture was customary among the peasantry in Hälsingland at an earlier date than in other parts of the country, and became increasingly established during the 17th century. The origin of individual pieces of furniture is usually evident from both carpentry and painting styles particular to the various parishes of the region. Far from every piece of furniture was elaborately decorated. Important objects, including chests and strongboxes, as well as armories and longcase clocks, were prioritized for beautification. The armoires were status objects not only due to their often intricate ornaments, but because of them containing the homestead's more expensive objects, including metalware. Longcase clocks were popular among the wealthier peasants by the end of the 18th century. While the style in Hälsingland was unique, the same valued pieces were eventually decoratively painted in many provinces of Sweden.

Uniquely Helsingian was the tradition of decorating the surface of the tables furnishing the great halls, the oldest examples are from the late 16th century. The custom was especially common in Delsbo parish, where numerous painted tabletops, chests, and cupboards from the 16th and 17th centuries have been preserved. Many artists from Dalarna were active as furniture painters in Hälsingland province. It was not unusual for the artist who decorated walls and ceilings to also decorate the furniture. The result would differ slightly, even when the same painter had been contracted. Different materials and the durability required of furniture demanded different pigments and binding agents, which in term dictated the decorative outcome.

== Colors and techniques ==
=== Pigments ===
A wide selection of colors are used in the Helsingian style. During the 18th and 19th centuries the colors were commonly mixed by the painters themselves. There are reports of painters gathering pigments from local earth deposits, but the usual method was to purchase them from merchants. Pigment analyses from 18th-century works have revealed different yellow and red pigments, and the presence of indigo dye, chalk, carbon black, and Ocher (red and yellow). Ocher was fashionable during the 19th century and was joined by red and yellow lead oxides, Prussian blue, chrome yellow, cinnabar, verdigris, and Paris green. Availability improved during the early and middle 19th century as trade laws were relaxed, and a number of merchants opened new shops in the province. These improvements, in conjunction with the release of industrially produced synthetic pigments during the 1860s, offered new opportunities.

=== Paints ===
Powdered pigments were mixed with water or alcohol, whereupon thickeners such as egg, glue, or flax oil were added. These natural products were procured from local farmers. Glue-based distemper was ubiquitous for decorating walls and ceilings. Wax bars made from boiling animal glue were heated and mixed with chalk to create white paint for the base layer. Distemper-covered walls are sensitive to both moisture and wear, but are otherwise resistant to degeneration. Furniture and household items—such as chests, armories, and doors, that were expected to endure wear and tear—were decorated using tempera or oil paint. Furniture painting was performed on untreated wood, with an underpainting of chalk and glue only occasionally utilized. The egg-based tempera in use was a mixture of eggs, flax oil, pigments, and water. Pure oil paint, using flax oil, was used for exterior walls.

=== Techniques ===
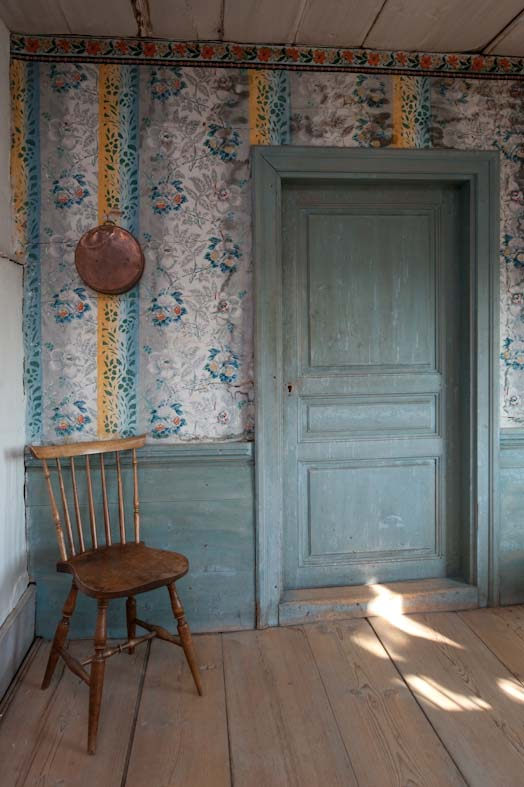
Bommars hall combines printed wallpaper with painted yellow and blue sections with ornate stencil patterns (middle 19th century).

Wall paint was applied directly on a wooden surface, on thin linen weave, or, from the 19th century onward, on heavy paper. Work was rarely performed on wattle and daub, since this was sparingly used as a means for insulation in Hälsingland province. Decorations on wood were done on flat wooden panels covering lumber, or on the lumber surface itself.

Painters were proficient in various techniques, employing spatter painting, marbleizing, stencil painting, and combinations with printed wallpaper, to create diverse expressions.

==== Marbleizing ====
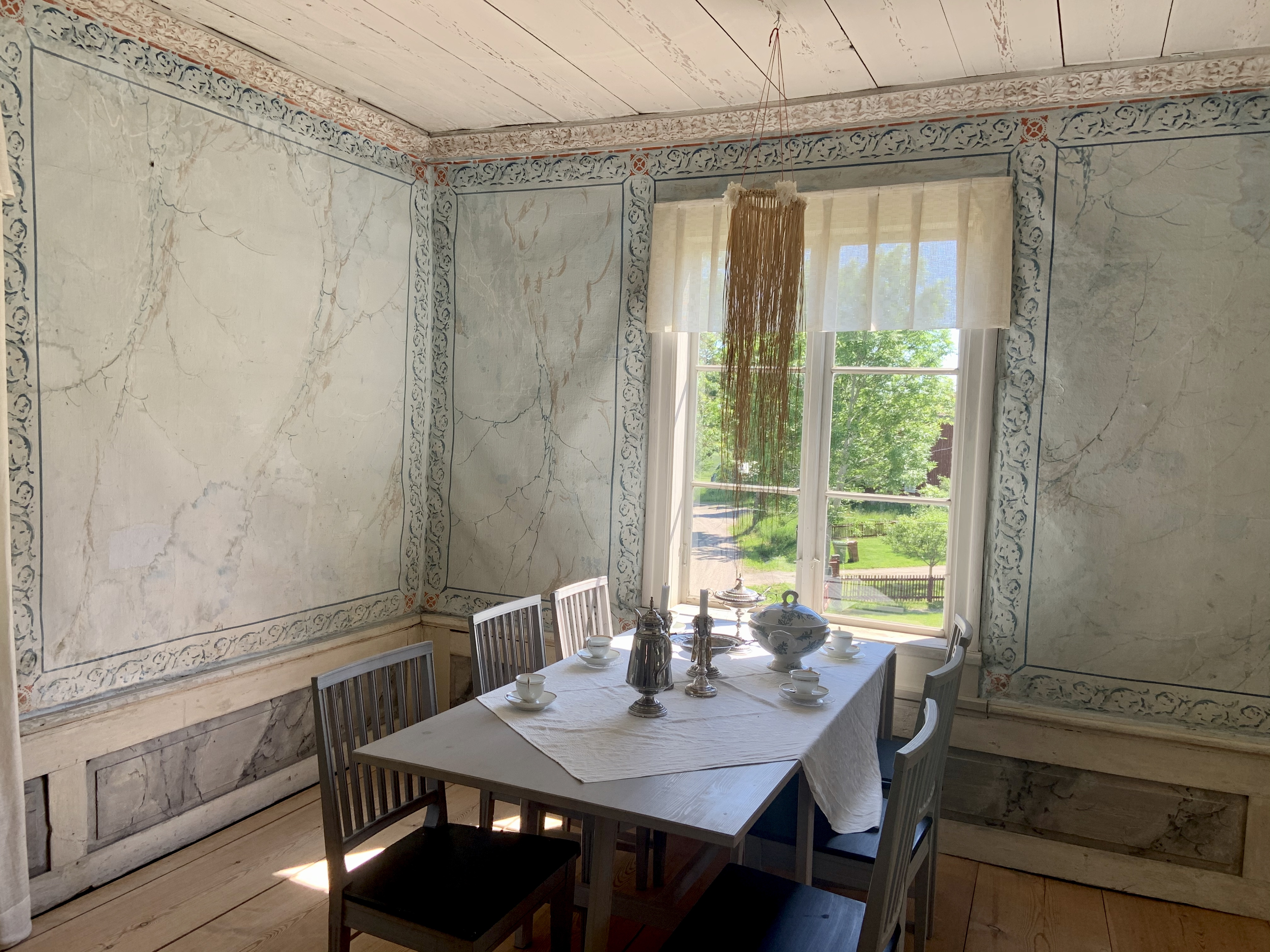
Marbleized sections framed by stencil painting by the Knutes family in the main hall at Erik-Anders (1850s).

Distinct marbleizing and flowing-wood imitations were more common in the Helsingian style compared to other Swedish folk art traditions. The Helsingian level of craftsmanship was also higher, likely through direct inspiration from artisanal imitations in local churches. Since the folk artists had most probably never observed real marble, there was a tendency over time for these imitations to become increasingly stylized. Gray-background imitations were prevalent, but marbleizing was also done on red backgrounds. In the Ljusdal area various styles of blue-background marbleizing were popularized. In Järvsö parish a certain way of painting furniture, called "cloud marbleizing", took hold in the late 18th century. The style uses dark-blue backgrounds achieved with carbon black and Prussian blue, with cloud lines in white lead. At the same time, a lighter version of blue marbleizing became favored for furniture painting by Ljusdal's artists. The pattern had previously been used for interior decoration in local churches.

==== Spattering ====
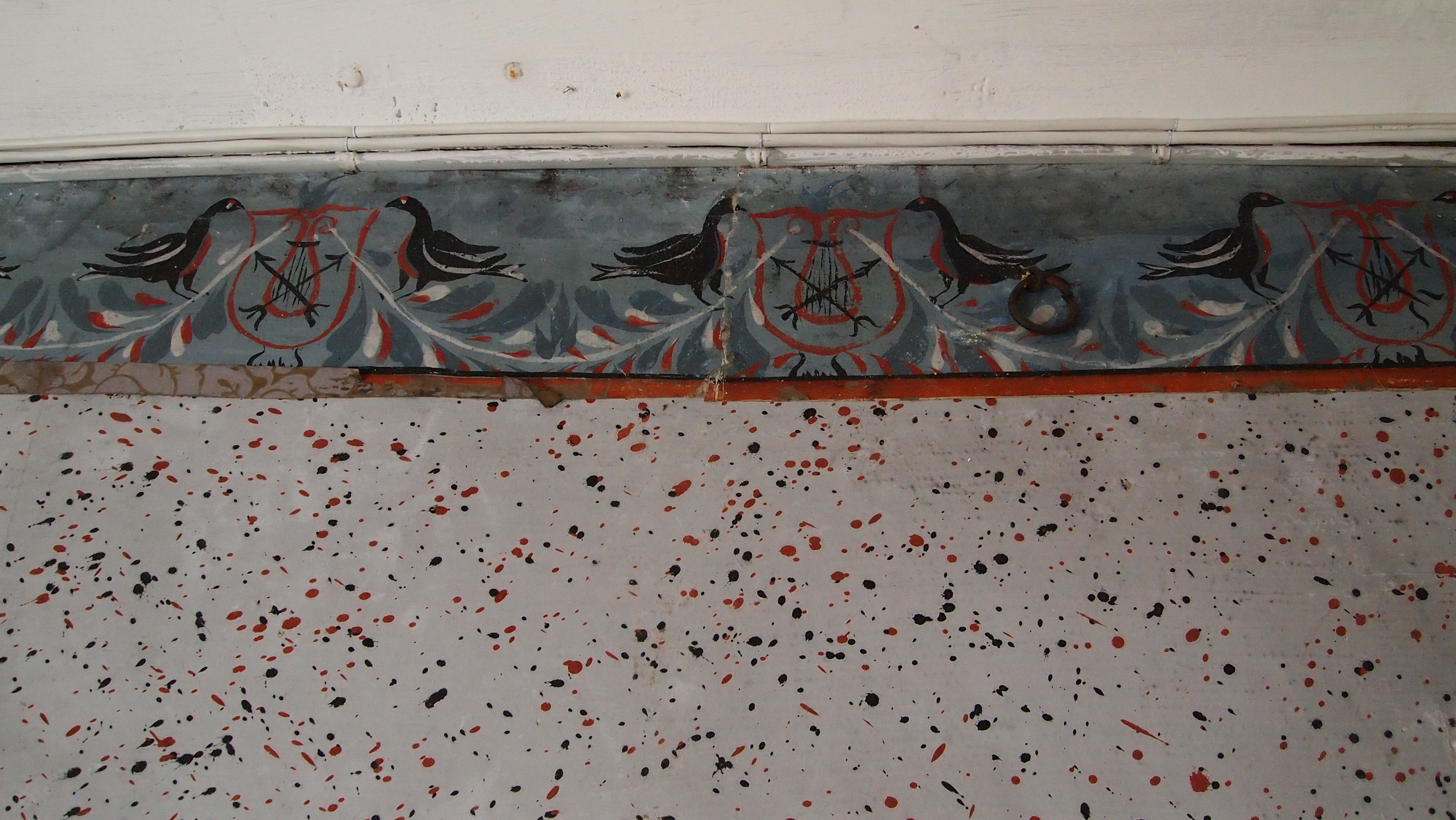
Spattered wall at Arbrå Fornhem.

Spattering was favored by the Swedish elite during the 17th and 18th centuries as a means to imitate expensive stone. Increasingly used by common folk during the 18th and 19th centuries, it became a staple technique of Helsingian painters. Due to its resilient nature it was widely used in the foyers and kitchens of Hälsingland farmhouses. Stains and wear would disappear in the general clutter of the spotted surface. Many versions of spattering were performed, always on a base layer of distemper. When the distemper had dried spots were scattered onto the wall with birch twigs. The artists used contrasting pigments on a red base to imitate exclusive porphyry.

==== Stencils ====
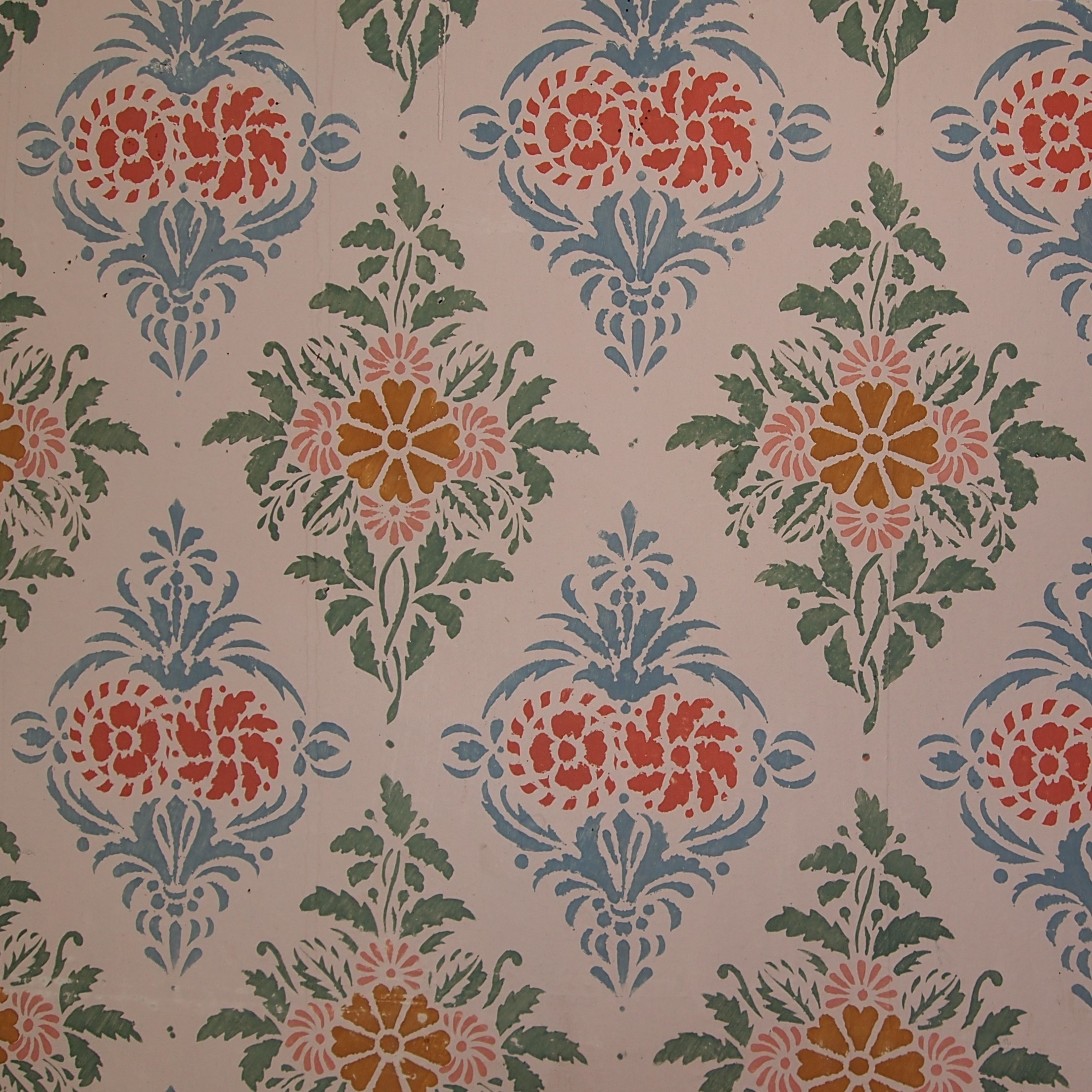
Stencil painted wall with flower ornaments by Jonas Wallström at Gästgivars (1840s).

The use of stencils to create complex patterns imitating printed wallpaper was popularized in Hälsingland during the early 19th century. Artists had been using stencils already, but these were "positive stencils" and paint was applied around their contours to create characters and various shapes. The novel style used "negative stencils" where the artists painted within the carved out shapes of these stencils. Simple geometric shapes and plant structures were combined to create intricate patterns. The artists worked on paper or paperboard, applied either to a layer of textile or directly on the wall timber. Similarly, stencils were made from paper and paperboard treated with shellac to improve stiffness and durability. Other materials used for stencil-making were blackplate, sheet metal, leather, and birch bark.

Stencil painters favored the use of distemper. The base layer was left for several hours to dry, after which the stencils were filled in with either a pig's hair brush or a stippling brush. For more complex patterns, series of stencils were used in sequence with fiducial markers to achieve synchronization. The artist would proceed step-wise across the surface and create a semblance of depth by varying tints. Stencils were seemingly popularized by Jonas Wallström, but they were soon adopted by many Helsingian and Dalcarlian artists active in the province. By the middle 19th century, the cost of printed wallpaper decreased, which contributed to the decline of stencil painting.

==== Graining ====
Carpentry pieces, including doors and panels, were sometimes subject to graining techniques imitating nobler species of wood. Just like marbleizing, Helsingian graining was quite stylized, but in many cases closer to the actual thing than usual in Swedish folk art. The artists used cloth, fingers, and the palms of their hands, or occasionally custom-made combs of various materials, often leather. The special properties required of graining paint were ensured by using unconventional binding agents, such as beer, syrup, or dairy products.

== As World Heritage Sites ==
Since 1 July 2012, seven Hälsingland farmhouses have been listed as a World Heritage Sites. The farmhouses have been selected to represent the decorative painting style of the 19th century golden era. The first nomination included a diverse selection of 15 homesteads and environments, including entire villages and a fäbod (a site for transhumance). The nomination was rejected at the UNESCO conference in Sevilla in June 2009, asking for a more concentrated selection of sites. Subsequently, five homesteads from the original nomination were kept and two more, recognized for their elaborate interiors, were added. In 2024, Helsingian stencil painting was recognized as a UNESCO intangible cultural heritage.

== Restoration and preservation ==
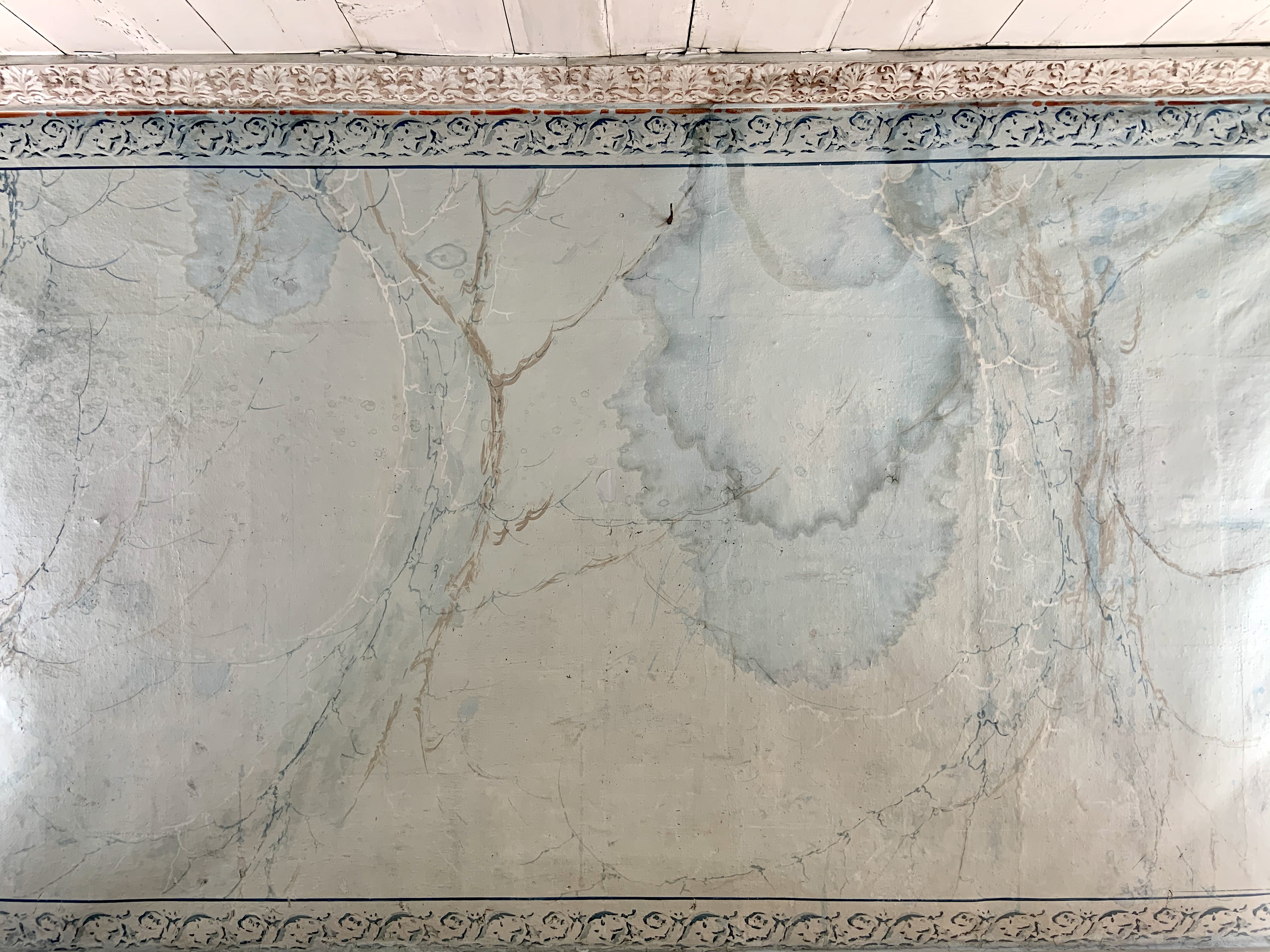
Damage from leakage at Erik-Anders.

A disregard for the traditional style would become a threat to its preservation. By the end of the 19th century, the old designs were derided, and there are numerous reports from the early 20th century of hundreds of years-old tapestries cut into pieces for washcloth, while old richly painted furniture was chopped into firewood, signs that these artifacts were considered usual and domestic, and not important to preserve for future generations. Many painted interiors would disappear as interest in renovating peaked during the 1940s and 50s. However, unlike Dalcarlian painting, there was no surge in demand during the late 19th century, which prevented the dissipation of works to willing buyers and museums. Therefore, more works have been preserved in their original location, as compared to other Swedish folk art traditions. Most of what has been preserved are on fragments of weave, heavy paper, and wooden planks. Complete interiors in their original location are mostly from the golden era of the 19th century.

Preservation has also been facilitated by inheritance customs that kept farmhouse ownership within the same family for generations. By tradition the great halls were only used on rare occasions and mostly stood empty, reducing the risk of, and need to, undertake renovations. Most homesteads consisted of numerous small buildings, which passively aided conservation, since not all of them were made subject to renovations over the years. Rooms and buildings that went out of use were apt to be left untouched as they were used for storage.

=== Academic interest ===
There was a surge of interest in folk art traditions at universities and museums at the turn of the 20th century. Helsingian painting was identified as one of three major traditions, alongside Dalcarlian painting and southern tapestry painting. Sigurd Erixon at the Nordic Museum in Stockholm authored several articles on Helsingian painting during the 1920s and 1930s. As academic interest mellowed during the latter part of the 20th century, work on collecting and inventorying was continued by local museums and heritage associations. Ingemar Svensson and Hilding Mickelsson conducted a large-scale investigation during the 1960s, with support from the Gävleborg Regional Museum and the Gästrike-Hälsinge Heritage Association. The results of their efforts was published in the book Hälsingemålningar (1968). Additional inventories were conducted during the late 20th century under the supervision of Kerstin Sinha at the Ljusdal Museum, in cooperation with local heritage associations. During the decades before and after the year 2000, there was once again an increase in academic interest, on this occasion from art history scholars. Several dissertations and theses on the topic of Helsingian painting were published.
