= David Johansson =

David Johansson may refer to:

- David Johansson (skier) (1926–2005), Swedish cross-country skier
- David Johansson (footballer) (born 1982), Swedish football defender
- David Johansson (diplomat) (born 1935), Finnish diplomat and ambassador

== See also ==
- David Johansen (born 1950), American musician also known by the stage name "Buster Poindexter"
- David Monrad Johansen (1888–1970), Norwegian composer
- David S. Johanson, a member of the United States International Trade Commission since 2011, and its vice-chairman for a 2016–2018 term
