= Jonas Wallström =

Swedish decorative painter

Jonas Wallström, born Andersson (6 April 1798 – 26 April 1862) was a Swedish decorative painter. He is known for the use of stencils to create elaborate patterns and for decorating the interiors of World Heritage Site Gästgivars in Vallsta, Hälsingland.

== Biography ==
Wallström was born in Vallsta village in Hälsingland. He was the son of soldier and lumberjack Anders Krok (1768–1837) and Greta Jonsdotter (1770–1853), and the second oldest among four children. Between 1814 and 1821 he lived in Hudiksvall while working as a apprentice of master painter Anders Winberg. He would later move back to Vallsta. At some point during or after his apprenticeship he adopted the surname Wallström after his home village. He continued his studies as a journeyman at Gustaf Söderbergs workshop in Stockholm between 1823 and 1831. Wallström is also believed to have studied under Carl Fredric Torsselius, a renowned designer of wallpapers. In the 1830s he returned to Vallsta once more and popularised the elaborate use of stencils for decorative painting in the region. Wallström would throughout his career remain a journeyman.

Wallström married Karin Jonsdotter from Hudiksvall in 1831. They had five daughters together. He was a close friend of painter Olof Hofrén who was appointed godfather to one of Wallströms daughters. Wallström died at home in Arbrå socken 26 April 1862, at the age of 64.

== Works ==
Wallström has painted several farmhouses in the central part of the Ljusnan valley, mostly in the regions of Bollnäs and Arbrå. Some of his works were signed, while others have been attributed to Wallström based on their style, including choice of motif and colours. His works are of various natures, a few pieces of furniture and paintings, but mostly complete interiors. The use of painted golden frames, columns and other ornaments in empire style is prominent. The painted motifs that the ornaments frame are usually pastoral or romantic landscapes. It is likely that he used german catalogues as inspiration or models.

The painted interiors of World Heritage Site Gästgivars in Vallsta are well preserved examples of Wallströms skill. A printed version of his "Gästgivars-wallpaper" was launched by Duro Sweden during the 1960s. The landscapes in the great hall are believed to have been drawn or copied from an unknown source.

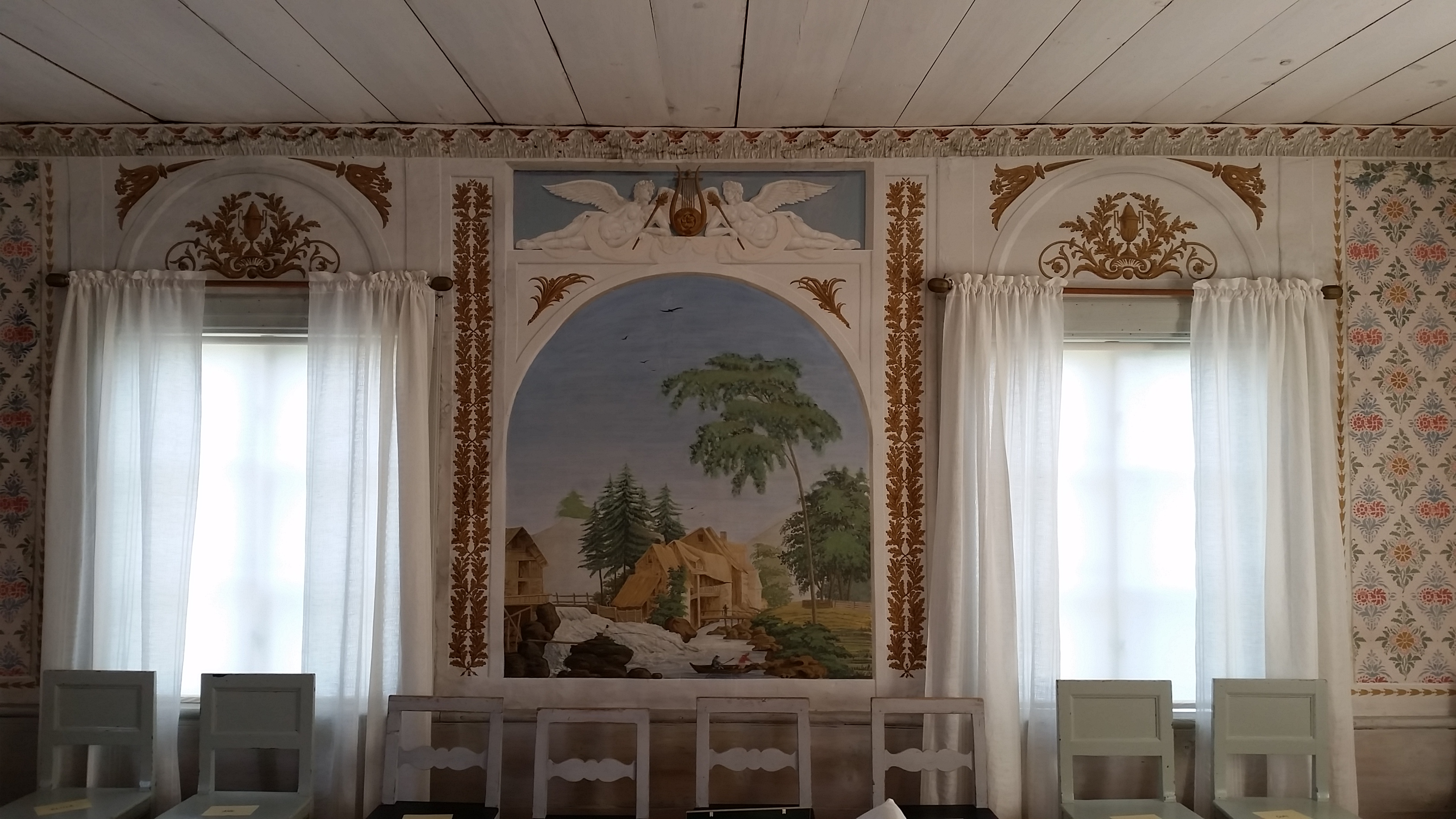
The great hall at Gästgivars

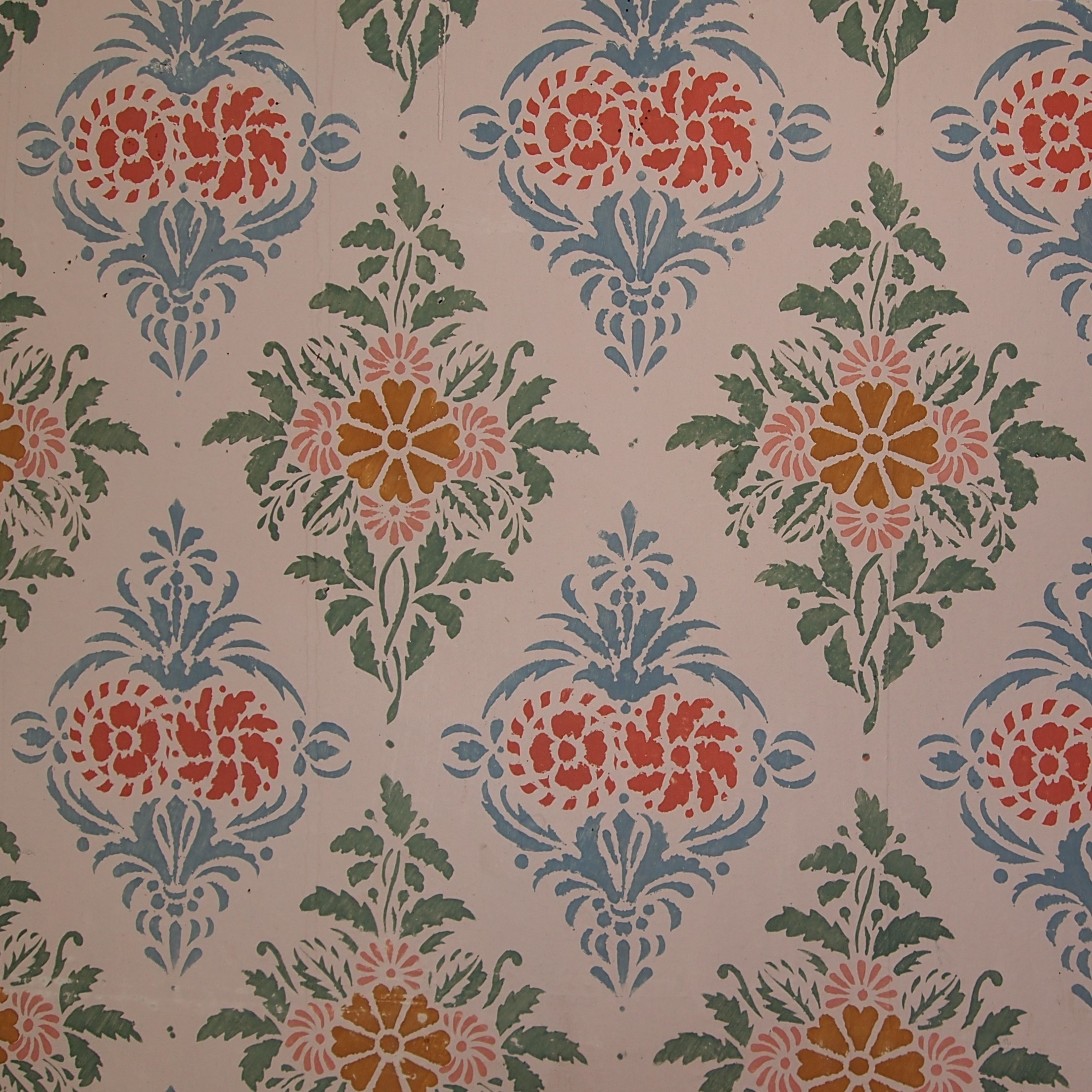
Close up of the "Gästgivars-wallpaper"

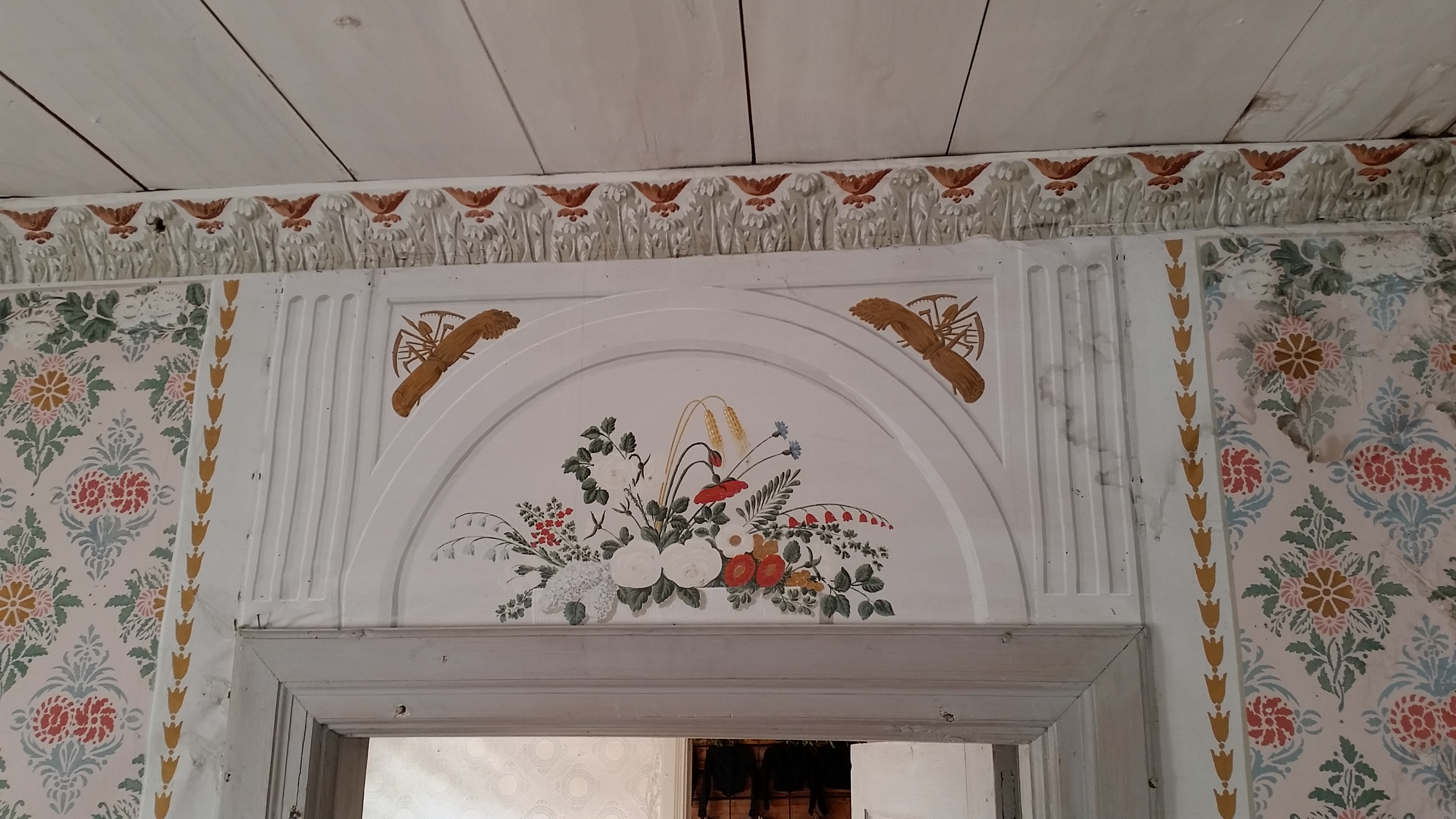
Close up of ornamentations at Gästgivars

Other works attributed to Wallström are exhibited at Hälsinglands museum, Renshammar in Bollnäs, Wallins in Växbo, Lars-Pers in Hov, Träslottet in Koldemo and Arbrå Fornhem. Though whether Wallström actually painted at Träslottet has been questioned. At Wallins he restored decorative painting performed by Paul Hallberg and completed a few works of his own in other rooms on the lower floor. He initiated work on the altar piece of Norrbo church in 1838, but had to give up due to failing health, after which the altar piece was completed by Albert Blombergsson. As the tradition of Helsingian painting was degenerating Wallström gradually shifted his work to paintings. A few of these paintings from the early 1860s have been preserved.
