= Hans Brask =

Swedish Catholic bishop (1464–1538)

The Most Reverend Hans Brask
- Bishop of Linköping
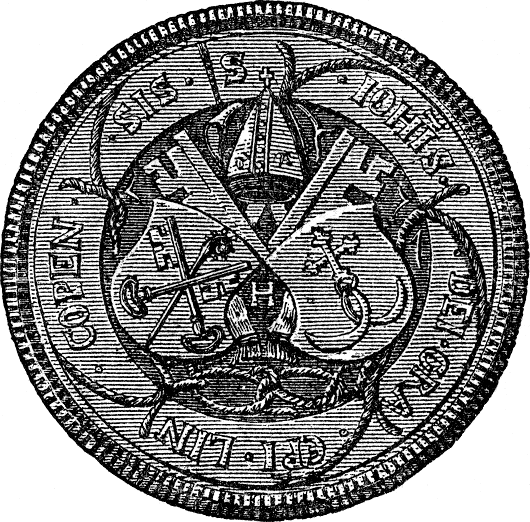
- Seal of Bishop Brask. Bears the inscription: S[IGILLVM] IOH[ANN]IS DEI GRA[CIA] EPI[SCOPI] LINCOPENSIS
- Church: Roman Catholic
- Diocese: Diocese of Linköping
- In office: 1513–1527
- Predecessor: Hemming Gadh
- Successor: Jöns Månsson

Orders
- Consecration: 7 August 1513 by Vincent Henningsson

Personal details
- Born: 1464 Linköping, Kalmar Union
- Died: 1538 (aged 73–74) Ląd, Poland

Hans Brask (1464–1538) was a Swedish Bishop of Linköping.

== Biography ==
Brask was born in Linköping in 1464 to a bourgeois family. He studied philosophy and law at German universities, e.g. Rostock, and around 1500 he received a doctoral degree in civil and canon law from Rome. Upon his return to Sweden he first worked as canon and was later, in 1505, appointed cathedral dean in the cathedral of Linköping. He also became a member of the council of the realm (Privy Council of Sweden) and worked for a reconciliation with Denmark, with which Sweden has been at war for some years as part of the ongoing conflicts in the Kalmar Union. In 1513 he was appointed bishop in Linköping. Brask was opposed to Sten Sture's struggle with archbishop Gustav Trolle, but signed a document at the 1517 diet to remove the bishop. According to Olaus Petri's Swedish chronicles, Brask was forced to sign the document. Under his seal he is supposed to have put a note saying "Härtill är jag nödd och tvungen" - "To this I am forced and compelled".

This legend has birthed the term in modern Swedish of Brasklapp ("Brask note"), meaning a hidden or oblique reservation to an otherwise spotless or obsequious acceptance. The word can by extension have several other meanings, including explanation, excuse, warning, parenthesis, or question mark. It is unrelated to braska, which is onomatopoeic and roughly means to bang or to rustle. Upon the fall of Stockholm and the Kalmar Union's restoration in 1520, Brask was - according to legend - allowed to leave and thus escaped the Stockholm Bloodbath by virtue of the note.

In fact Brask supported the Danish king Christian II, but was not part of the events that led to the infamous massacre in Stockholm 1520. After Gustav Vasa's rebellion, he was forced to join the new king's side, but he would become an opponent of the king's politics. The events of 1527 diet in Västerås led to Brask fleeing the country to Poland.

Brask was an active man with many ideas. He was the first man to plan a canal between the two large Swedish lakes, Vänern and Vättern. He was running a printing house in Söderköping. The correspondence between Brask and others is an important source of history in a country where not much was written down.

Bishop Brask is believed to have died in Ląd (Swedish Landa) monastery (the Cistercian Trail, Poland) in 1538, where his tombstone is seen to this day.

Catholic Church titles
Preceded by Hemming Gadh	Bishop of Linköping; 1513–1527	Succeeded by Jöns Månsson
