= Paul Hallberg =

Paul Hallberg (1734–1789) was a decorative painter based in Hudiksvall, active in Hälsingland province.

Hallberg was among the first of the Helsingian painters who had undergone a formal arts education. He purportedly began his training in Stockholm, became a journeyman in 1760 and was granted permission to work in Hudiksvall from 1763. He completed several altarpieces in the area, with relatively proficient use of perspective. Many were copied from or heavily inspired by earlier works and Hallberg regularly copied illustrations from Christopher Weigel's Histriae Calebriores (1712).

Hallberg decorated the Färila chapel in 1776, painted the altarpiece as well as sculptures ornaments of the Ljusdal church, and the altarpiece of Delsbo church in 1764. Among his best preserved profane works is a painted linen tapestry from 1768 at the number 10 homestead in Växbo north-east of Bollnäs.
