= Gustaf Reuter =

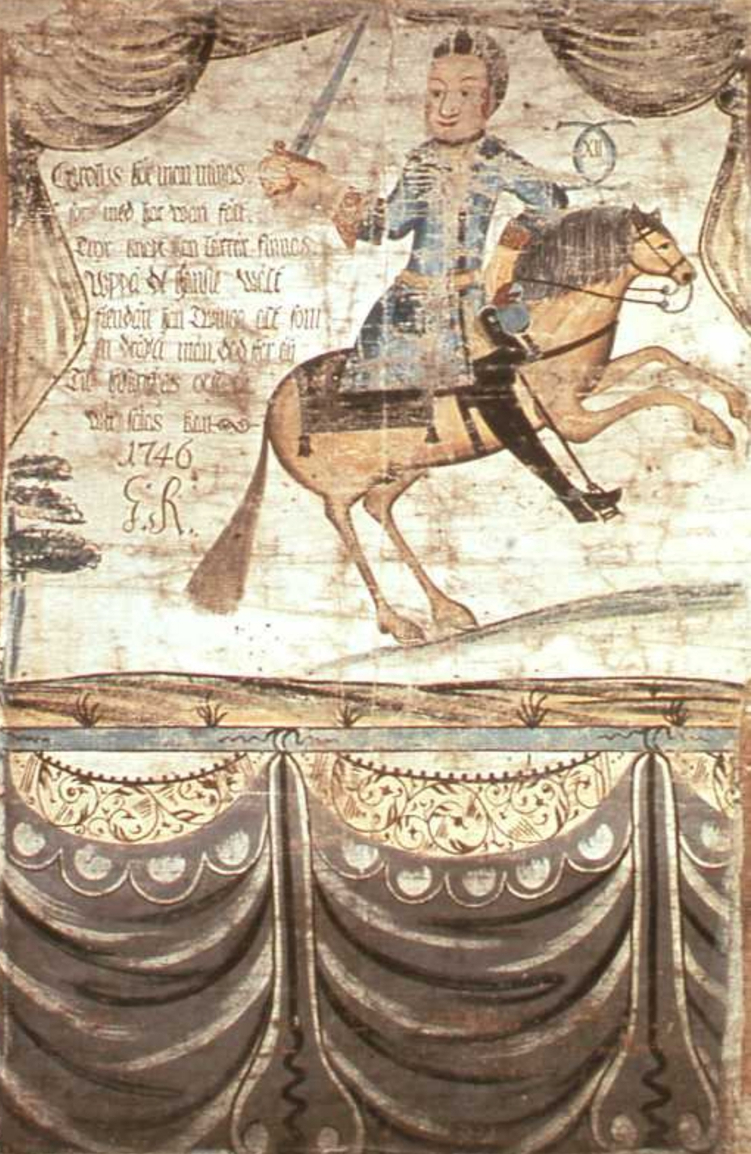
Charles XII by Reuter (1746).

Gustaf Reuter (30 January 1699 – 27 April 1783) was a Swedish soldier and folk artist.

Reuter was known for the decorative painting of entire room interiors, usually with biblical motifs or horsemen, in Delsbo and surrounding parishes. He was also a church painter, employing colorful Baroque patterns and flower ornaments. Considered among the foremost folk artists in the country, he is the most well known artist of the Helsingian style. He is represented at Skansen in Stockholm and the Hälsingland Museum in Hudiksvall.

== Biography ==
Since 1935 Reuters birthplace has wrongly been traced to Värmland. Court records show that he was the son of priest's daughter Margareta Andersdotter Lebestadia in Himmeta, Västmanland (born 1677). Lieutenant Gustaf Gustafsson Reuter af Skälboö (1669–1732), who was claimed to be the father was already married and denied fatherhood, but eventually lost the case in November 1699 at the municipal court in Köping.

According to church records Gustaf Reuter would spend some of his early years at the clergy house in Himmeta, and stayed in Delsbo parish from around 1718. He became a resident of Delsbo and entered military service in the Delsbo company in 1721. Reuter would participate in several military campaigns, foreign and domestic, throughout his career. He served in Finland between 1739 and 1741. In 1742 he was promoted to corporal and eventually retired in 1757. As a folk artist he remained active until at least 80 years old.

Reuter married Brita Johansdotter Klingström from Fellingsbro (1697–1784) in 1722. They had nine children together. Their oldest son, Carl, followed in his fathers footsteps, both as an artist and a soldier, before dying in combat in Pomerania in 1758.

== Career ==
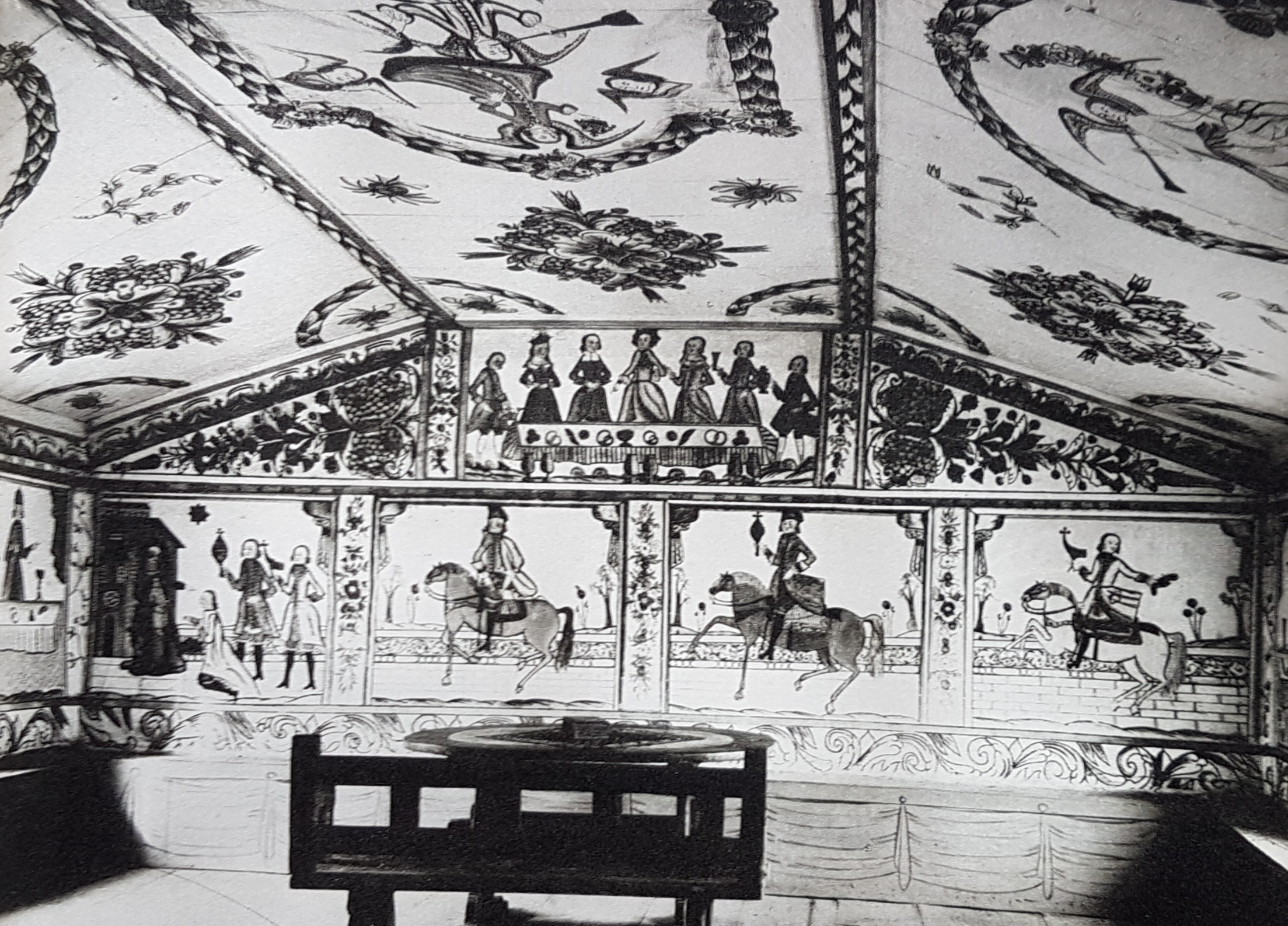
Interior in 'Norrgården' by Reuter.

Reuters career as a soldier likely influenced his choice of motifs, where horsemen, especially military commanders like Charles XII, were ever-present. At the same time, horsemen were a common motif during the Carolingian era. He also performed the customary biblical motifs. Drawing images of baby jesus and the three kings, but in Reuters work the three kings were usually replaced with contemporary monarchs or other celebrities unrelated to the biblical tale. Sometimes, the likeness of his patrons and their families were included in the composition.

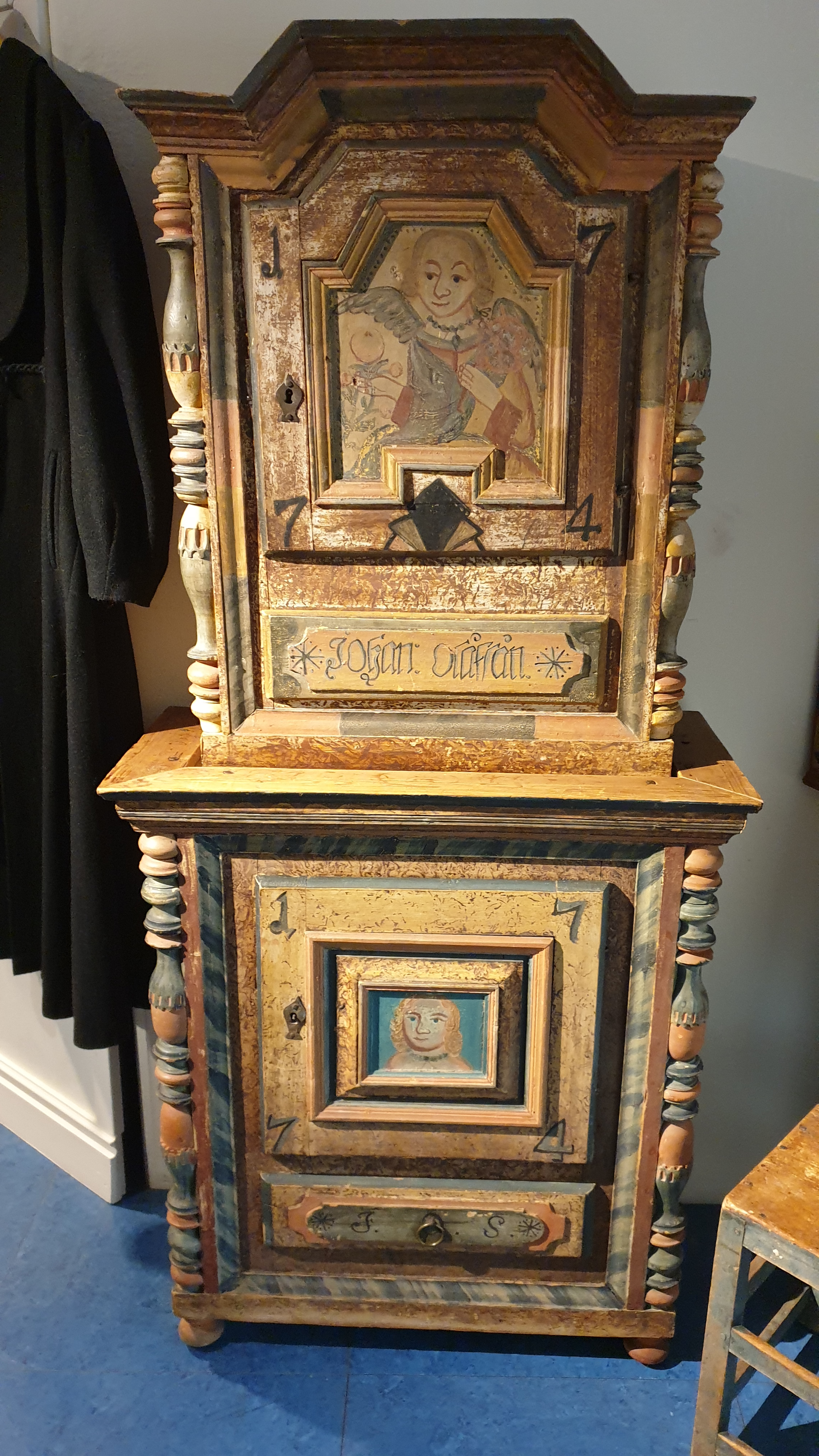
Tall cupboard at the Ljusdal Museum with decorations attributed to Reuter.

Reuter divided the walls into sections framed by painted leaf ornaments, draperies, flowers and fruits. The central motifs use stylized figures with demarcated black contours. The remaining palette is in red, brown and yellow, typical colors of the era. At the middle 18th century planks were increasingly used to create flat ceilings, which offered new opportunities for Reuter and his colleagues. Reuter covered his ceilings with angels, evangelists and idealized women, framed by leaf ornaments.

Unlike most Helsingian painters, Reuter would sign his works, which has simplified the process of making attributions. His signatures were "Gustaf Reuter från Delsbo", "G. Reuter" with year, just "Gustaf Reuter" or simply his initials "G.R." He also used a visual signature with multi-pointed stars, but so did many of his contemporaries, which makes it a dubious tool for attributions. Reuter was active as a church painter in several local and regional churches during the 1730s.

From between 1740 and 1760 there are at least twenty interiors attributed to Reuter. Factoring in destroyed or otherwise lost pieces his total production is most likely far higher, and fragments from earlier room designs have been found rolled up for storage in regional farmhouses. His last signed interior was completed in 1775 and the last one attributed to him was done in 1778. Of the preserved interiors, several have been restored or reworked, and no longer represent Reuter's original palette or techniques.

=== A family of painters ===
Reuters wife and one of his since, probably Carl, worked on Delsbo church in 1741, a year after the church was damaged by fire. This occurred while Reuter himself was abroad on military campaign. During 1745–46 Gustaf and Carl Reuter continued working on the church's interiors together.

=== The Delsbo School ===
Gustaf Reuter belonged to a group of artists and apprentices who became custodians of a trademark style, referred to as the Delsbo School by ethnologist Sigurd Erixon. The members were currently known and unknown painters active during most of the 18th century. His most well known apprentice was Erik Ersson, whose style is directly reminiscent of Reuter's. A complete interior by Ersson is displayed at the Hälsingland Museum. Reuter's son Carl Roth is considered a member of the school as well. A third member was Anders Ferm from Västansjö, who probably contributed to the interiors at Delsbo Forngård. Enumerated influences to the Delsbo School include gothic, renaissance and baroque. Reuter became influential, but his style was hardly innovatory as there are clear predecessors within the tradition. A similar style was popular in the Bjuråker parish during the early 18th century and there are many commonalities with the Voxna valley style of the 16th and 17th century.

Among the active 18th century painters in Hälsingland, Gustaf Reuter and his associates are responsible for a significant portion of the total number of preserved works. Their style has been discovered in almost a dozen parishes i northern Hälsingland. Several works are preserved in the collections of the Hälsingland Museum and the Nordic Museum. Complete interiors are on display at Bjuråker Forngård, Delsbo Forngård, Forsa Forngård and in the Delsbo farmhouse at Skansen.

==== The Delsbo farmhouse at Skansen ====
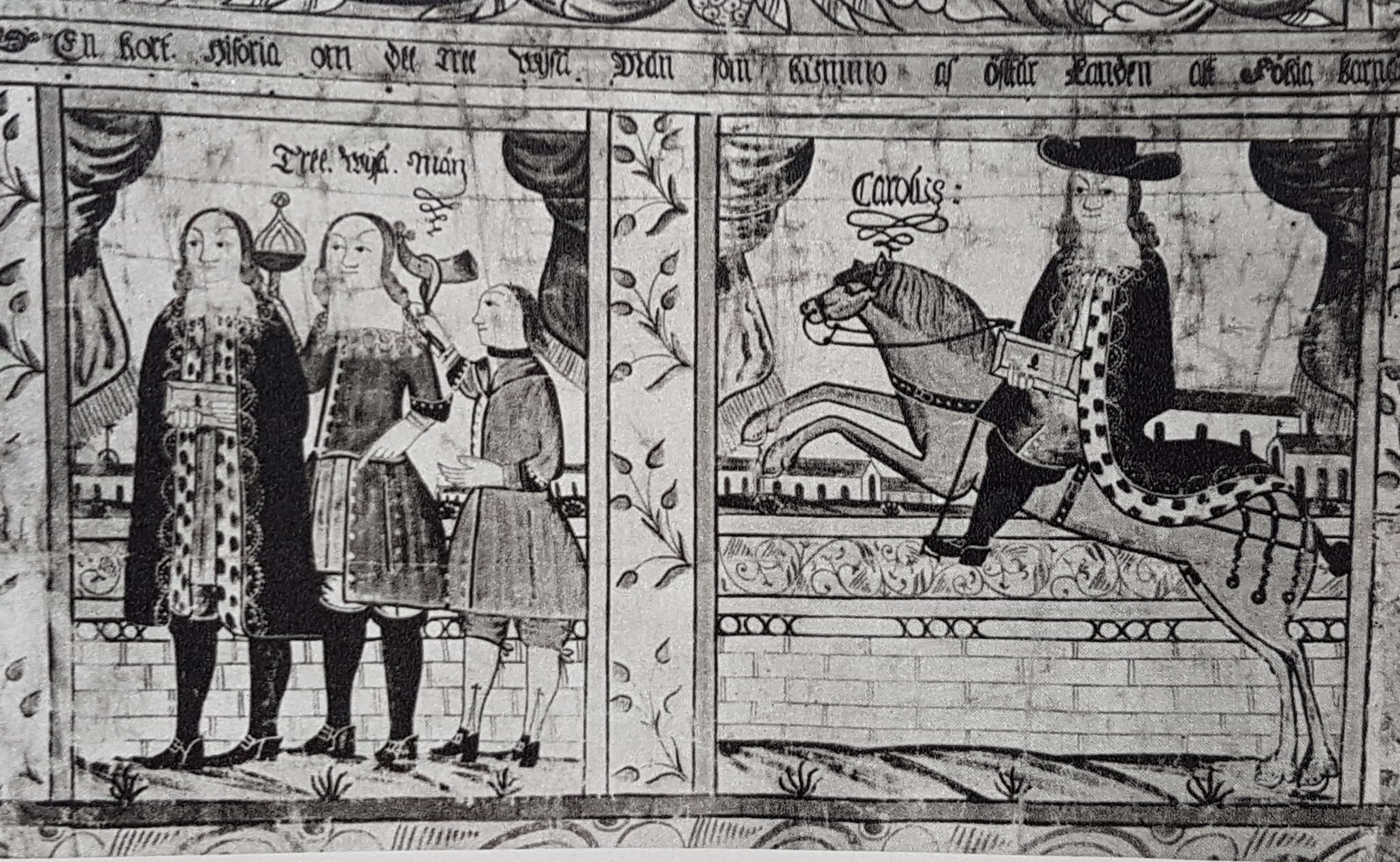
Interior from the farmhouse.

Skansen bought the main building from the Karls farmhouse in Tjärnmyra in Delsbo parish in 1927. Since the building itself turned out to be in awful condition, only decoratively painted rolls of linen weave were recovered from the main hall. They were eventually re-used to decorate the 'Västerängsstuga' at Skansen's Delsbo farmhouse. The ceiling planks boast painted ornaments and angels in Reuter's style, completed in 1773.

For a long time, the wall decorations were also considered the work of Reuter, but there are traces of a stencil known to belong to Erik Ersson. There are also stylistic clues suggesting that they are actually the work of Ersson.
