= Erik Ersson =

Swedish decorative painter

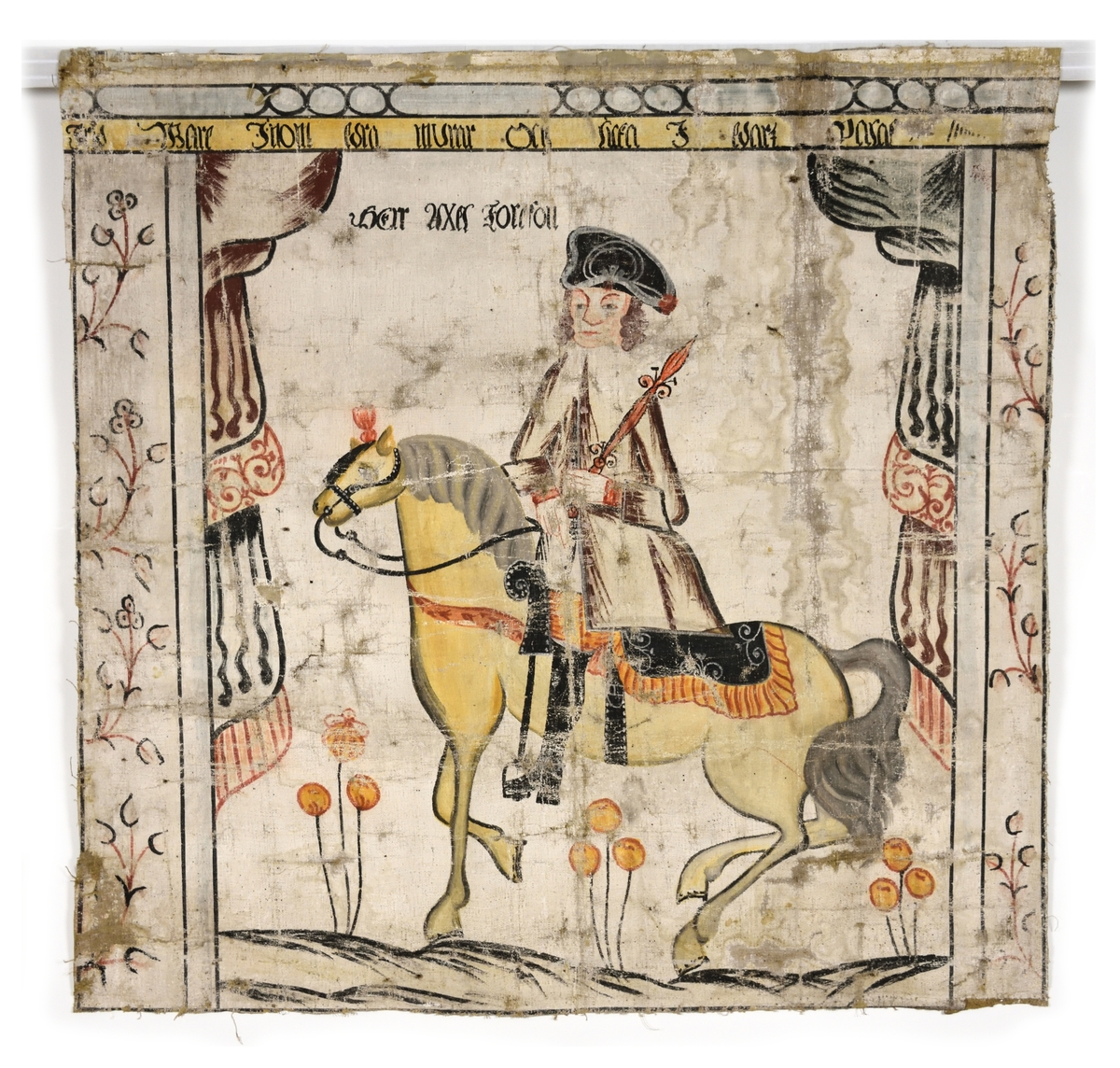
Horseman painted by Erik Ersson in 1768.

Erik "Snickarmålarn" Ersson (1730–1800) was a decorative painter from Delsbo socken.

Ersson grew up at the Snickars farmhouse in Källeräng village in Delsbo socken. At the age of 19, he was taken to court for loitering but managed to avoid forced conscription. Ersson married Margta Jonsdotter from Kila in 1752. He also became the brother-in-law of his colleague Carl Roth, after Roth had married Ersson's sister Kerstin Ersdotter.

Ersson is on the basis of his apprenticeship with Gustaf Reuter and his style considered a member of the Delsbo school of decorative painting. Like Reuter, Ersson would usually sign his work. He was active in the Dellen and Arbrå areas. Ersson has been confirmed as still active in 1794, a few years before his death. Between 1751 and 1752 he decorated the interior of Hög church together with Gustav Reuter's son Carl Roth. They painted the gallery and choir. Several farmhouses in Hälsingland have been decorated by Ersson, such as Bjuråkers forngård and Delsbo Forngård. Some of his works are preserved in the collections of the Hälsinglands museum, including a completely preserved decorated room from Forsa socken, originally part of the Mickels-farmhouse in Nansta.
