= David Johansson (skier) =

Swedish cross-country skier (1926–2005)

- Born: 16 August 1926; Delsbo, Sweden
- Died: 24 September 2005 (aged 79); Delsbo, Sweden
- Occupation: Cross-country skier

David Johansson (16 August 1926 – 24 September 2005), called Dalle, was a Swedish cross-country skier who won the 38th Vasaloppet ski race in 1961 in a new record time of 4 hours, 45 minutes and 10 seconds. After his own career, David Johansson coached the Swedish skier Thomas Magnusson.
