= Gustaf Söderberg =

Swedish army officer

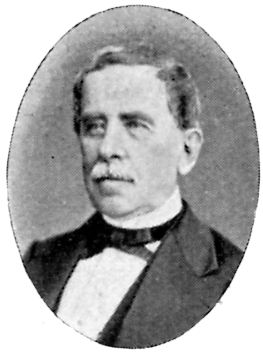
Gustaf Söderberg

Gustaf Söderberg (8 April 1799 – 3 November 1875) was a Swedish painter and military officer.

== Biography ==
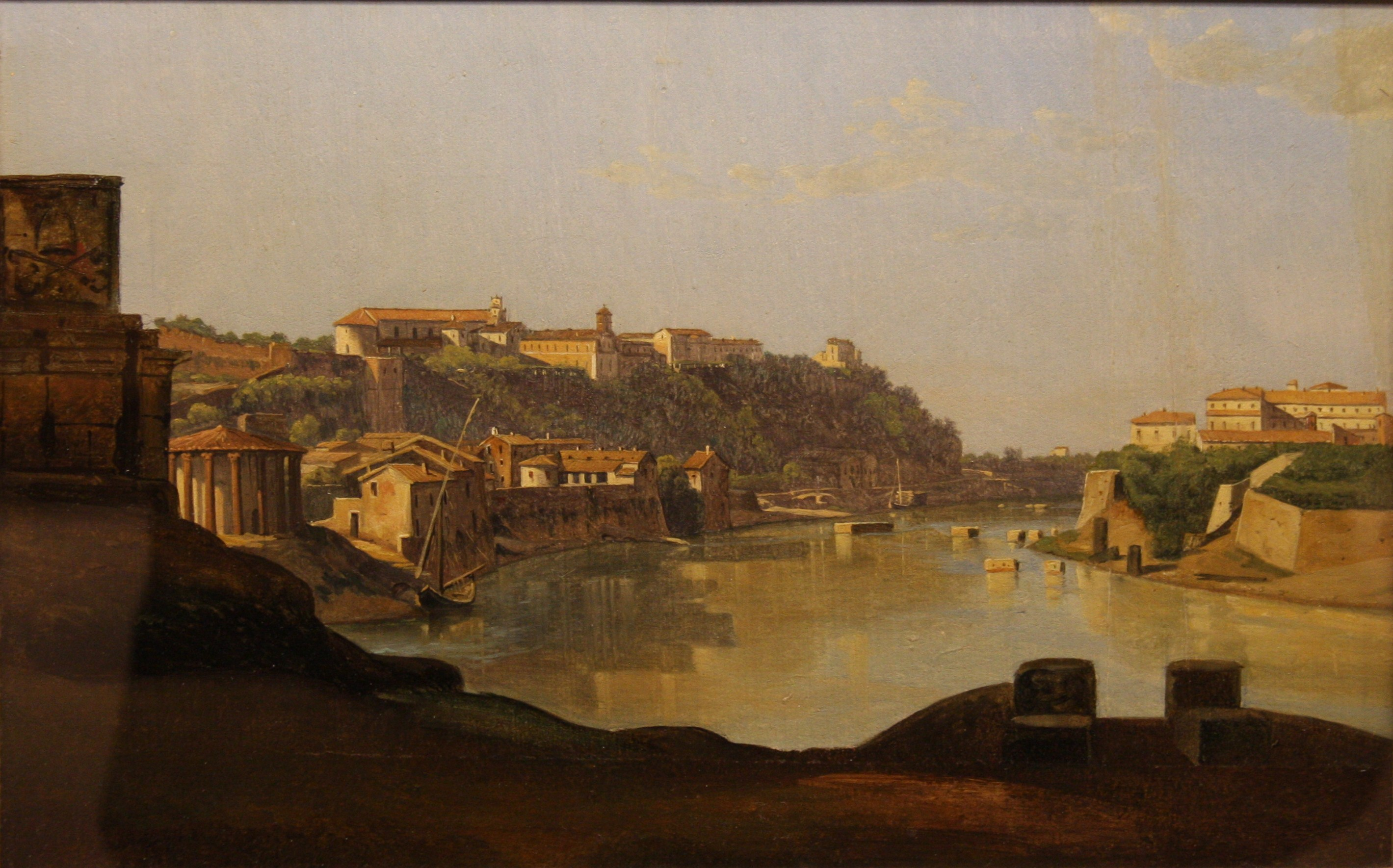
View over the river Tiber to the Aventine Nationalmuseum, c. 1820

Söderberg was born at Norrköping in Östergötland, Sweden. He was the son of the clothing manufacturer Johan Söderberg and Agnes Arosenius. He studied art in Stockholm and had a career in military service. In 1819 he went to Italy and in 1821 spent some time in Paris. In 1824, he traveled through Norway on a painting tour. He regularly participated in the Academy of Fine Arts exhibitions from 1822.

He was appointed Adjutant at the Expeditionary General for the Army at Stockholm in 1826. In 1827 he was appointed ordination officer of the Crown Prince. He was commissioned to make lithographic poster work on the Swedish and Norwegian military uniforms which was completed in 1828. He became Adjutant to the Crown Prince in 1833. During the 1830s to the 1850s, he made several trips around Europe while advancing in the military grades to become Colonel. He retired from military service in 1864 and spent his last years traveling in Europe. He died in Stockholm during 1875.
