= Gästgivars =

Gästgivars, Vallsta
UNESCO World Heritage Site
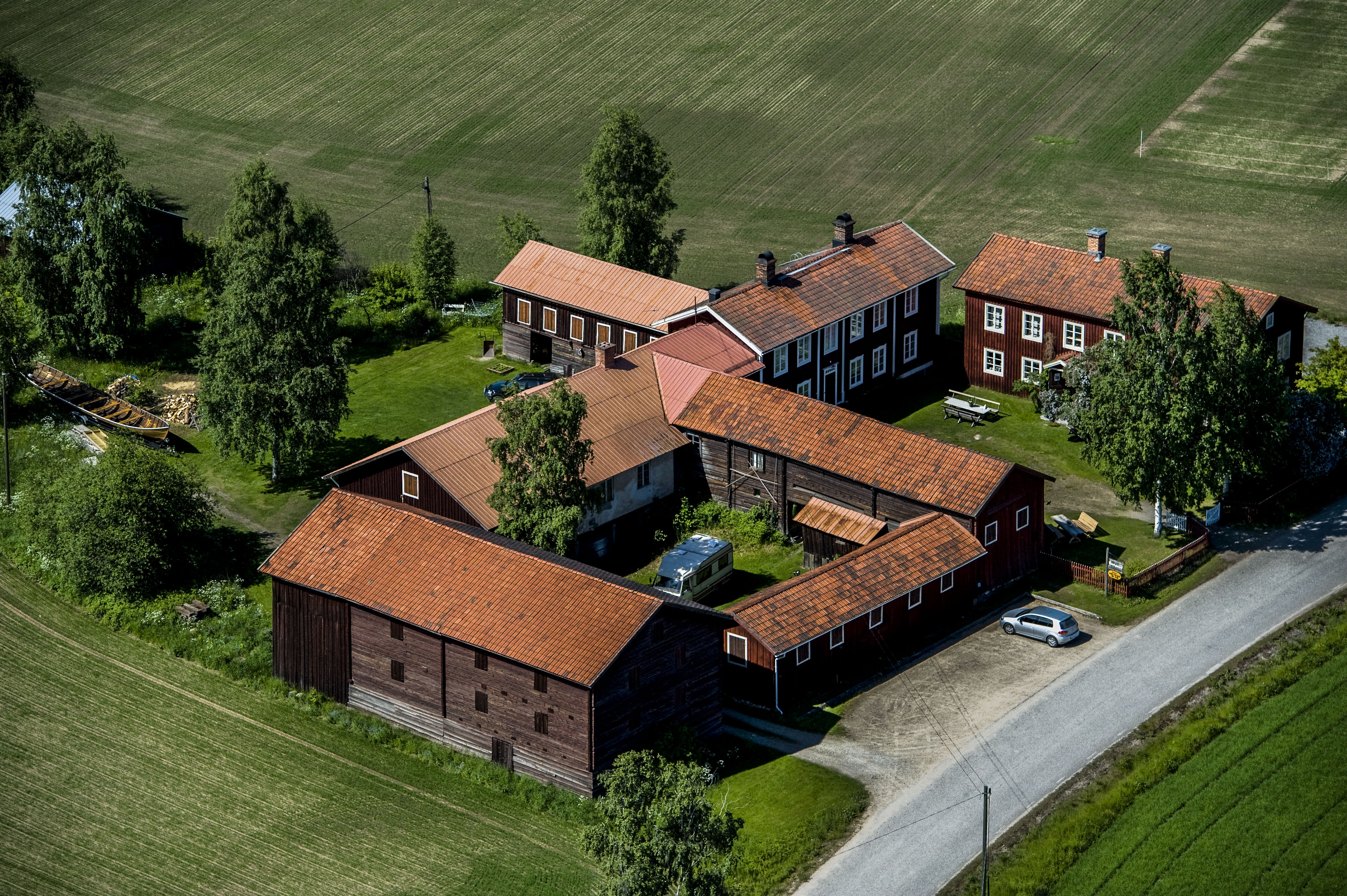

- Location within Sweden Gävleborg
- Location: Vallsta, Bollnäs Municipality, Gävleborg County, Sweden
- Part of: Decorated Farmhouses of Hälsingland
- Criteria: Cultural: (v)
- Reference: 1282rev-002
- Inscription: 2012 (36th Session)
- Area: 0.75 ha (1.9 acres)
- Buffer zone: 116.3 ha (287 acres)
- Coordinates: 61°31′56″N 16°22′4″E

Gästgivars is a Swedish farm in the Bollnäs Municipality and the province of Hälsingland. It is one of the seven decorated farms of Hälsingland which are collectively recognised by UNESCO as a World Heritage Site since 1 July 2012. Gästgivars has been a listed building since 2010.

== Gallery ==
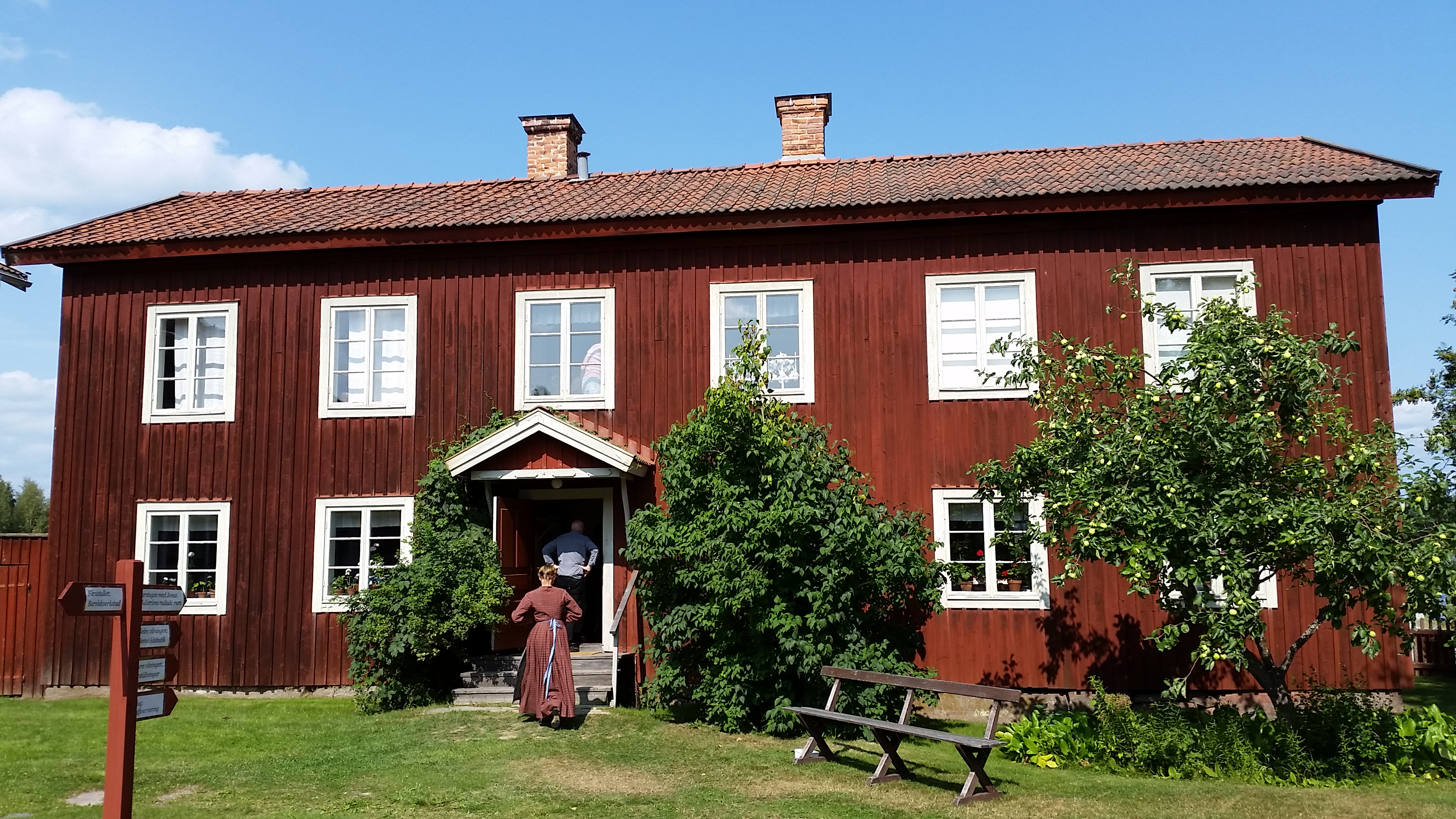
The main building.

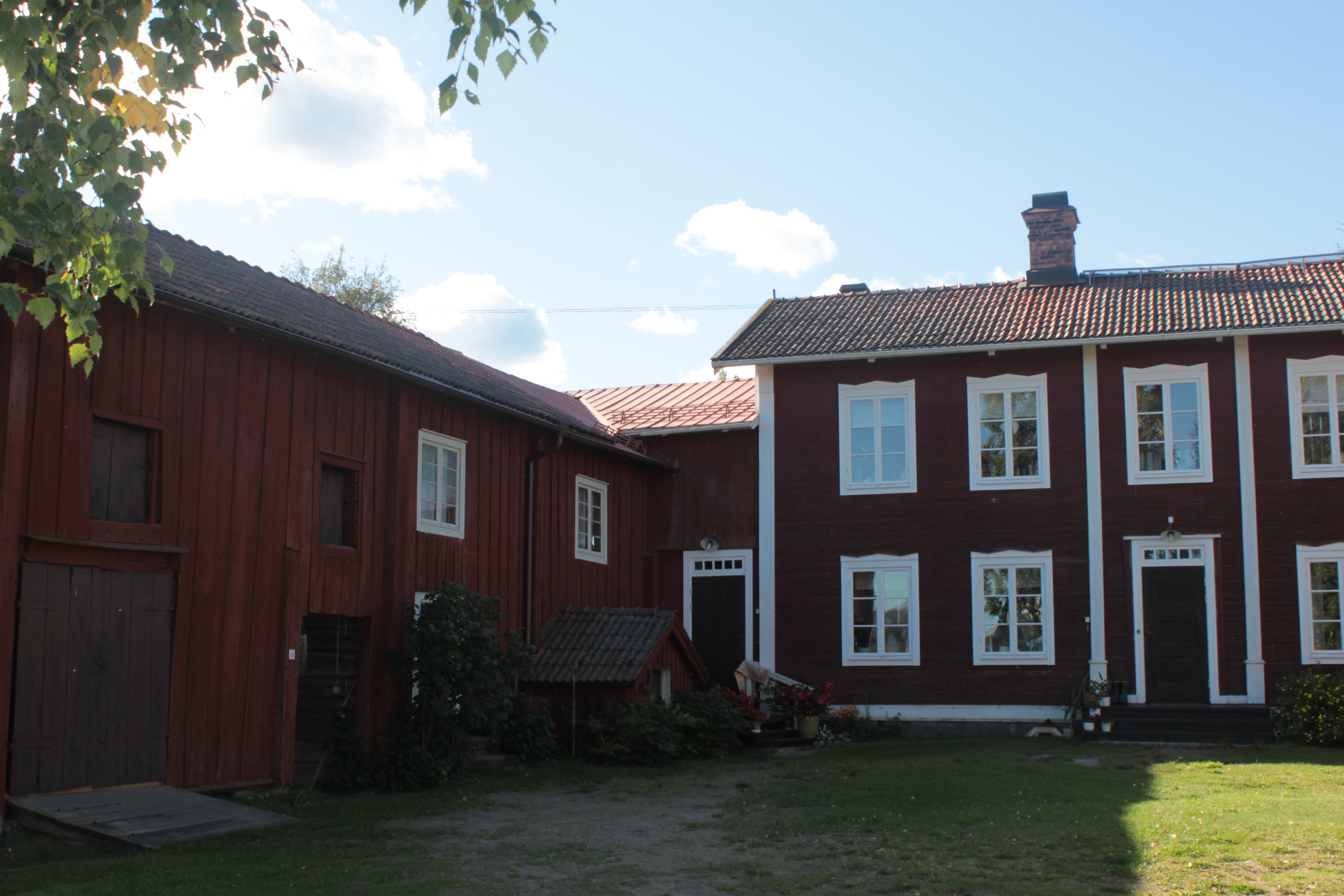
Shed.

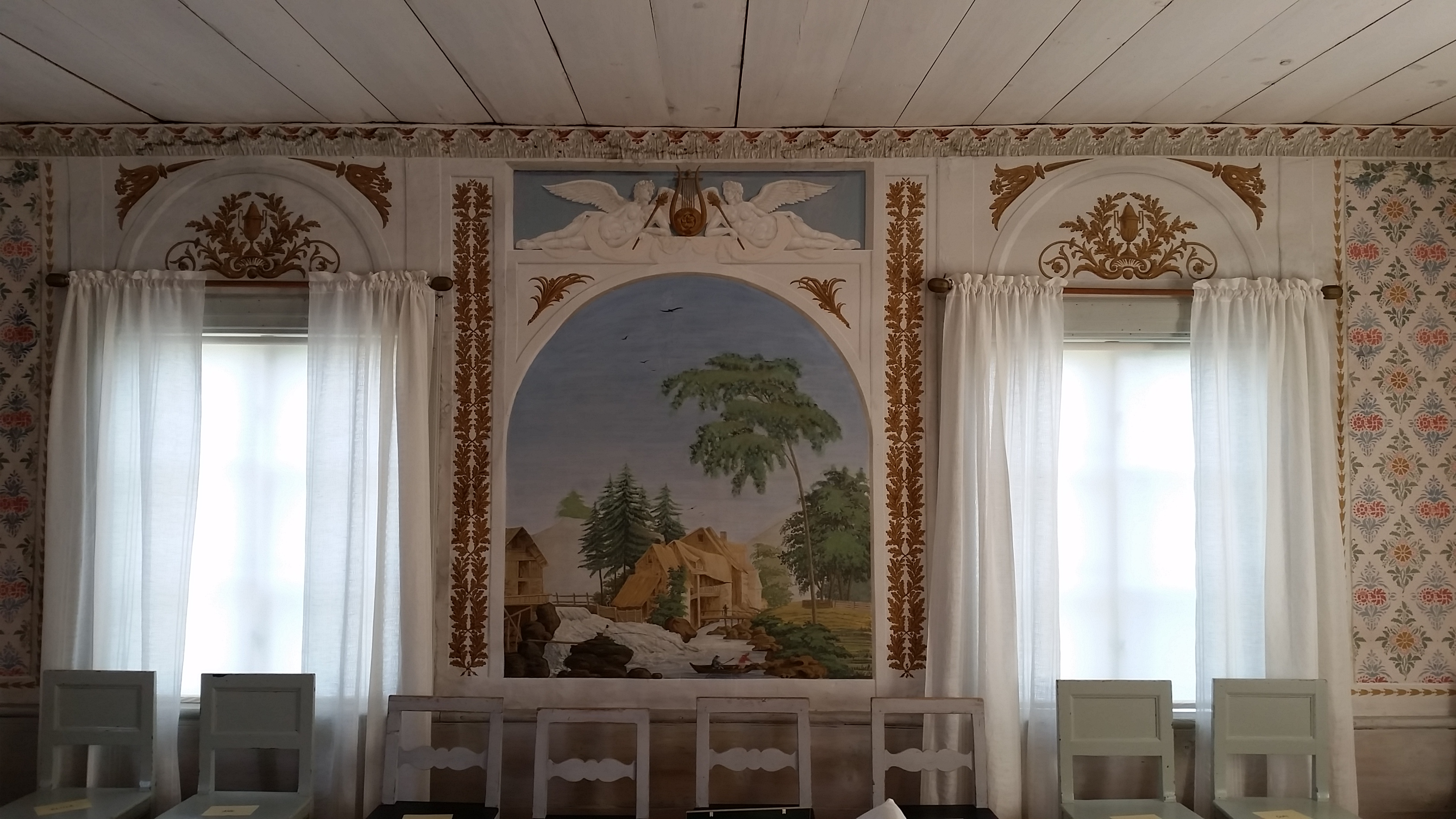
A wall painting by Jonas Wallström.

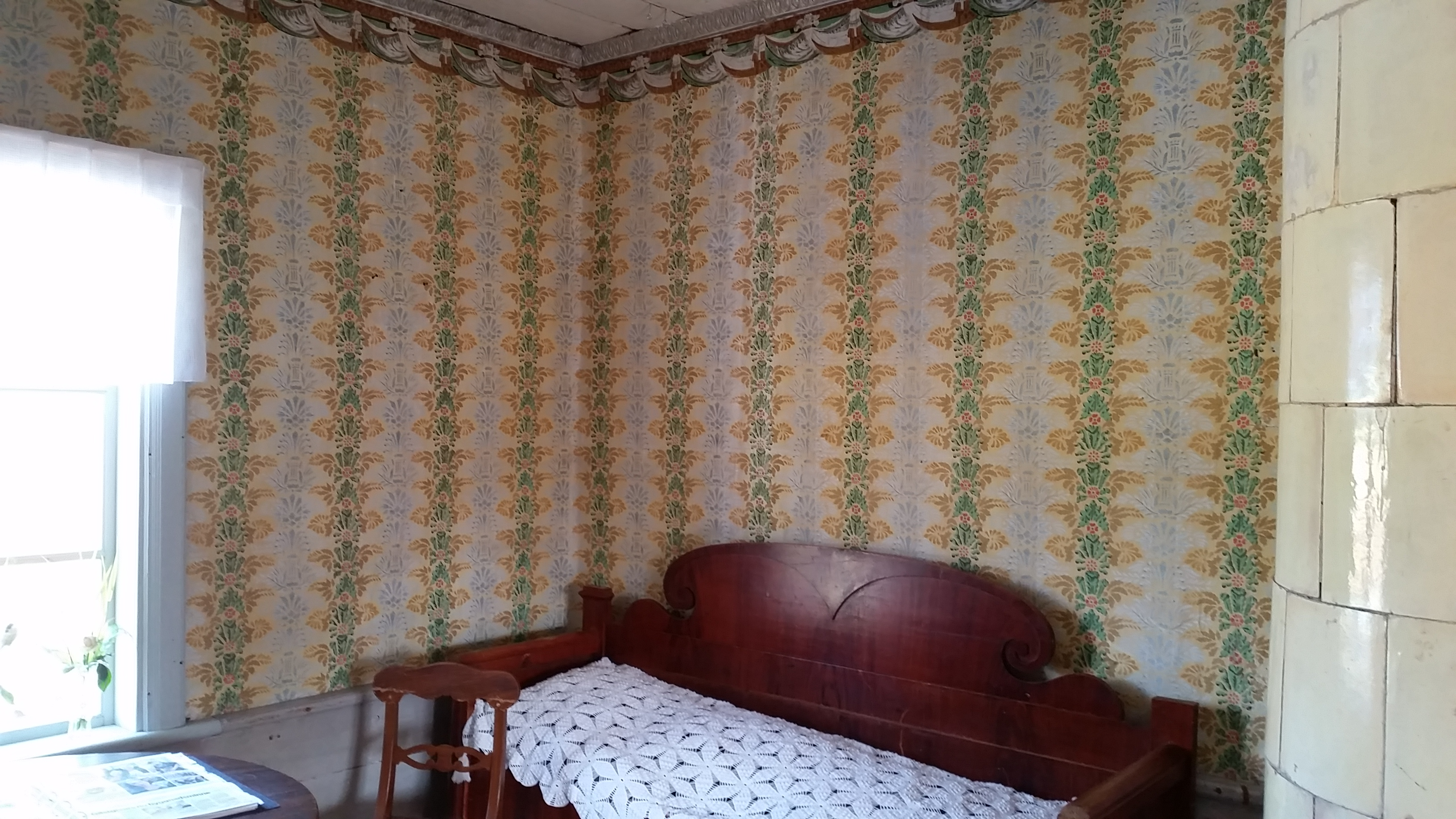
A room with walls decorated by Wallström.
