= David Johansson (diplomat) =

Finnish diplomat (born 1935)

David Johansson (born 1935) is a Finnish diplomat and ambassador. He was the Finnish Ambassador to Nairobi and Addis Ababa 1990–1995. Prior to that he was Deputy Director General of the Development Cooperation Department 1983-1987 and Head of Department 1987–1990 in the Ministry for Foreign Affairs.

== See also ==
- List of ambassadors of Finland
