= Bäck Anders Hansson =

Swedish decorative painter from Dalarna

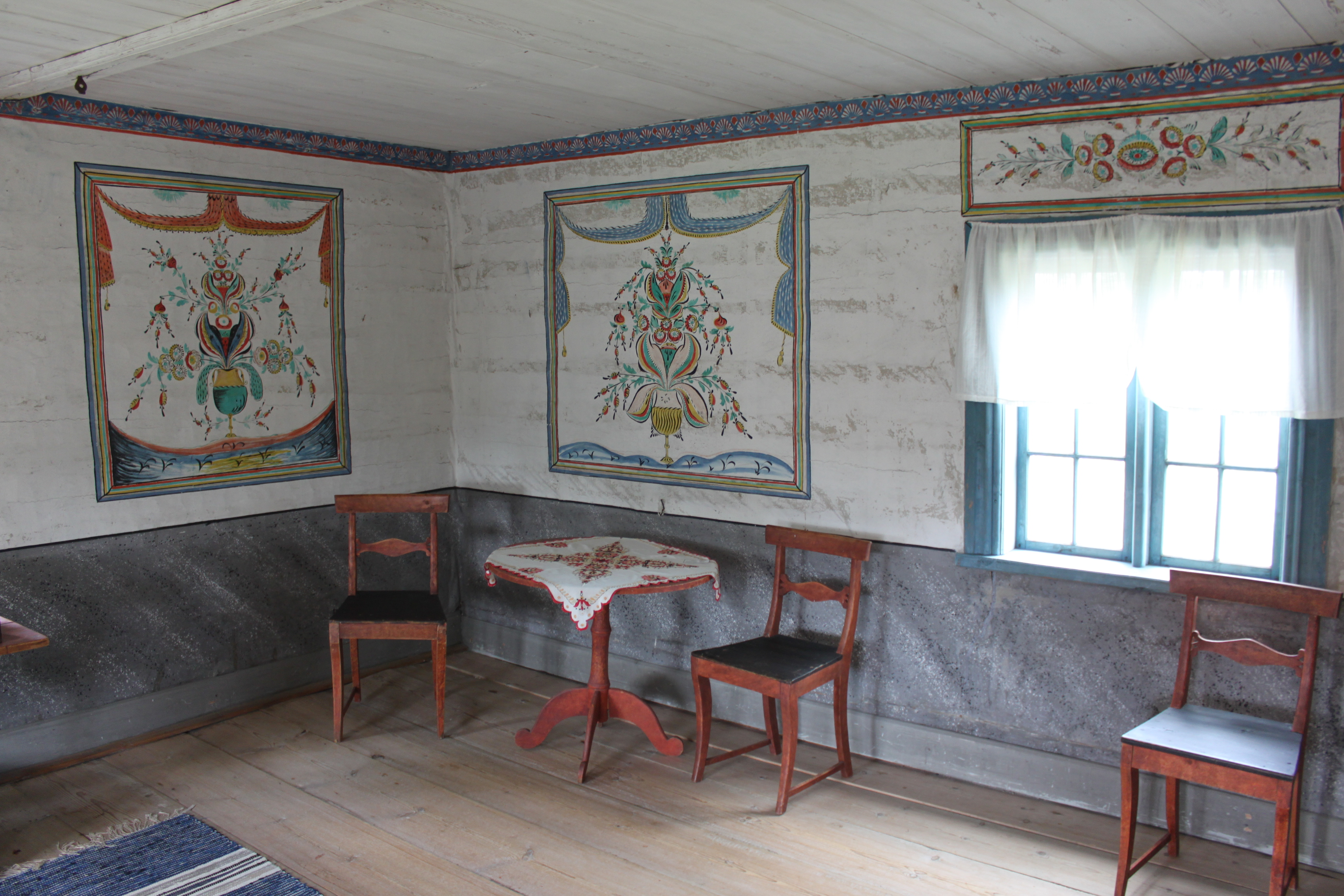
The celebration hall at Fågelsjö Gammelgård, painted by Hansson in 1856.

Bäck Anders Hansson (1790–1867) was a swedish decorative painter active in Dalarna and surrounding regions.

Bäck Anders Hansson was born in Lerdals socken, as the son of Häger Kerstin Hansdotter (1754–1821) the soldier Hans Andersson Lustig (1758–1791). His father was an infantryman in Gustav III's freikorps and died on campaign in Finland, when his son was only a year old. Anders Hansson would grow up on his mother's family farm in Lerdal along with several members of his extended family. He married Slång Anna Hansdotter in 1813 and moved to her family farm in Gärdebyn where they would have four children together. Around this time Anders Hansson seems to have adopted his brother-in-law Bäck Anders Olsson's first name Bäck, which had initially been tied to Olsson's home farm "Rovgärde".

Notes in the church records from the 1820s and 1830s have since been interpreted as signs that Hansson was absent due to his occupation as a traveling painter. In 1848 the word "Hergedalen" was scribbled, suggesting that Hansson was active in that region at the time. Hanssons wife Slång Anna Hansdotter would frequently accompany him on his journeys. Hansson died in 1867 in Gärdebyn.

Interiors attributed to Hansson have been encountered in Boda socken, Floda socken and Rättviks socken in Dalarna. He is also the man behind several farmhouse interiors in Lillhärdals socken in Härjedalen. There is another person by the same name born in 1810 who, incidentally, was an associate of a couple of decorative painters who went by the name "Nygårdspojkarna". This has been a source of uncertainty surrounding attributions. However, it has since been accepted that it is Bäck Anders Hansson from Lerdal that decorated the World Heritage Site Fågelsjö Gammelgård in 1856, assisted by his wife.
