= Delsbo =

Place in Hälsingland, Sweden

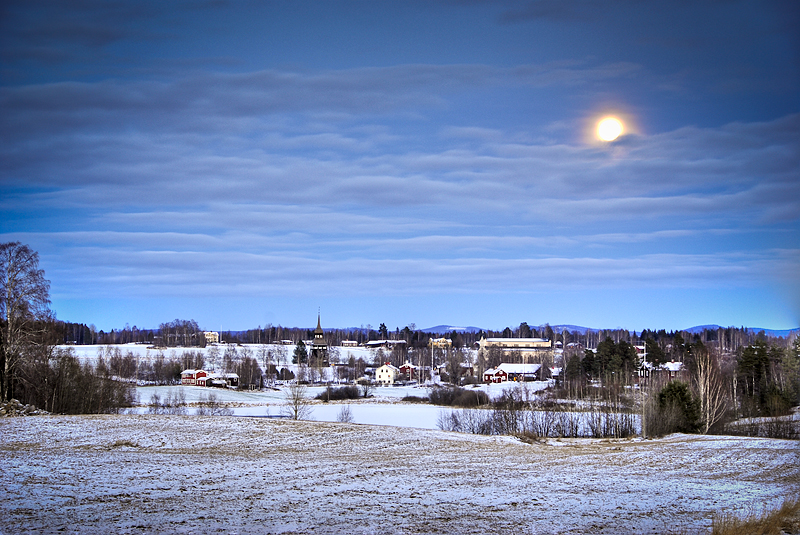
- Dellenbygden with Delsbo Church and belfry

- Location within Sweden Gävleborg Location within Sweden
- Coordinates: 61°48′N 16°35′E
- Country: Sweden
- Province: Hälsingland
- County: Gävleborg County
- Municipality: Hudiksvall Municipality

Area
  - Total: 2.85 km^{2} (1.10 sq mi)

Population (31 December 2010)
  - Total: 2,192
  - Density: 770/km^{2} (2,000/sq mi)
- Time zone: UTC+1 (CET)
  - Summer (DST): UTC+2 (CEST)

Delsbo (Swedish: [ˈdɛ̌lsbʊ]) is a locality in Hudiksvall Municipality, Gävleborg County, Sweden, with 2,192 inhabitants in 2010. It is situated some 25 kilometers west of Hudiksvall, in the vicinity of the two lakes of Dellen. The town is known for its assembly of musicians at Delsbo Heritage Centre (Delsbo Forngård) every year.

== Villages ==
Research conducted in 2005 revealed that Delsbo has the highest density of villages in Sweden. Approximately 104 different villages are scattered around the Delsbo community, among them the villages Ava, Johannesberg, Loppet, Långbacka, Norrberg, Norrväna, Oppsjö, Sannäs, Stenbo, Vitterarv and Västanäng. A local newspaper-reporter described Delsbo as a place with "a village behind every tree". The population of the Delsbo villages range from one person to a couple of hundred.

== Climate ==
Delsbo has a humid continental climate (Dfb). Summers are very warm for the northerly latitude in combination with quite moderate winters, that still retains larger seasonal differences than nearby Hudiksvall.

Climate data for Delsbo (2002–2021 averages); extremes since 1901
Month	Jan	Feb	Mar	Apr	May	Jun	Jul	Aug	Sep	Oct	Nov	Dec	Year
Record high °C (°F)	11.0 (51.8)	13.0 (55.4)	16.7 (62.1)	25.4 (77.7)	28.8 (83.8)	32.8 (91.0)	33.6 (92.5)	33.0 (91.4)	26.6 (79.9)	21.8 (71.2)	15.9 (60.6)	11.9 (53.4)	33.6 (92.5)
Mean maximum °C (°F)	5.6 (42.1)	7.0 (44.6)	12.2 (54.0)	19.2 (66.6)	24.0 (75.2)	27.0 (80.6)	28.6 (83.5)	26.8 (80.2)	22.1 (71.8)	15.5 (59.9)	10.7 (51.3)	6.9 (44.4)	29.8 (85.6)
Mean daily maximum °C (°F)	−1.9 (28.6)	−0.7 (30.7)	4.0 (39.2)	10.6 (51.1)	15.3 (59.5)	19.8 (67.6)	22.5 (72.5)	20.7 (69.3)	15.9 (60.6)	8.8 (47.8)	3.3 (37.9)	0.0 (32.0)	9.9 (49.7)
Daily mean °C (°F)	−5.7 (21.7)	−4.7 (23.5)	−0.8 (30.6)	4.6 (40.3)	9.4 (48.9)	13.9 (57.0)	16.7 (62.1)	15.3 (59.5)	11.0 (51.8)	5.0 (41.0)	0.3 (32.5)	−3.4 (25.9)	5.1 (41.2)
Mean daily minimum °C (°F)	−9.5 (14.9)	−8.7 (16.3)	−5.6 (21.9)	−1.5 (29.3)	3.4 (38.1)	8.0 (46.4)	10.9 (51.6)	9.8 (49.6)	6.0 (42.8)	1.2 (34.2)	−2.8 (27.0)	−6.8 (19.8)	0.4 (32.7)
Mean minimum °C (°F)	−22.1 (−7.8)	−21.2 (−6.2)	−17.2 (1.0)	−8.3 (17.1)	−3.6 (25.5)	1.9 (35.4)	5.0 (41.0)	3.0 (37.4)	−1.5 (29.3)	−6.5 (20.3)	−11.5 (11.3)	−17.6 (0.3)	−25.2 (−13.4)
Record low °C (°F)	−35.6 (−32.1)	−35.9 (−32.6)	−31.9 (−25.4)	−21.2 (−6.2)	−8.5 (16.7)	−2.6 (27.3)	1.3 (34.3)	−2.0 (28.4)	−8.2 (17.2)	−15.0 (5.0)	−23.5 (−10.3)	−33.2 (−27.8)	−35.9 (−32.6)
Average precipitation mm (inches)	34.4 (1.35)	22.6 (0.89)	22.8 (0.90)	20.2 (0.80)	41.4 (1.63)	61.1 (2.41)	66.5 (2.62)	72.5 (2.85)	41.1 (1.62)	50.2 (1.98)	37.2 (1.46)	37.8 (1.49)	507.8 (20)
Source 1: SMHI
Source 2: SMHI climate data 2002–2021

== Dialect ==
The local dialect is known as Dellboskan. It is a Norrlandian dialect with some Norwegian attributes.

Examples:

- Hän ä'nt sa ugalin = Det är inte så illa (It isn't (too) bad)
- Dellenbiggda = Dellenbygden (The Dellen area).

== Notable natives ==
- Johanna Sällström (actress) (grew up there with her father)
- Jörgen Brink (cross-country skier)
- Ebba Andersson (cross-country skier)
- David Johansson (cross-country skier)
- Thomas Magnusson (cross-country skier)
- Peter Dolving (entrepreneur, artist, writer) (from Skytts at Norrväna. The oldest historical building is from 1640. Interior conservation 80's.)

== Sports ==
The following sports clubs are located in Delsbo:

- Delsbo IF
