= Jöns Månsson =

Swedish decorative painter and carpenter

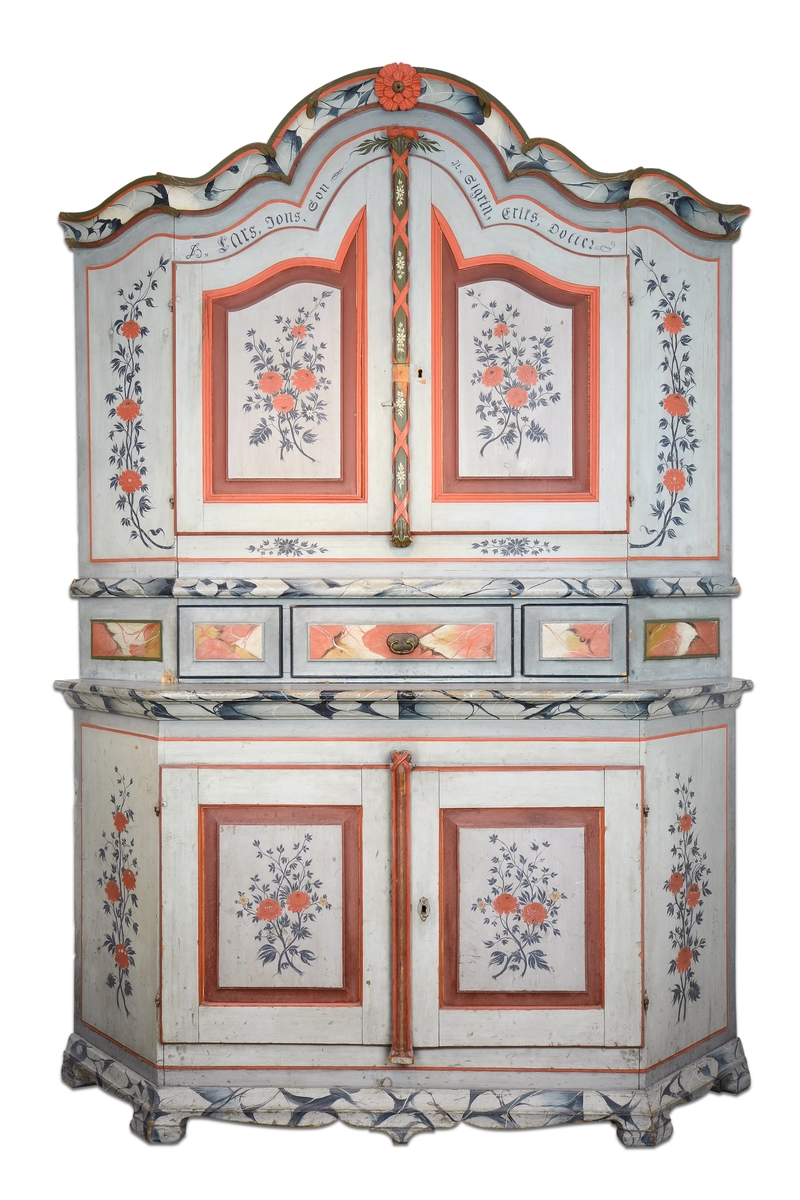
Armoire painted by Månsson in 1800.

Jöns Månsson i Böle (4 April 1769 – 28 May 1867) was a Swedish carpenter and decorative painter based in Forsa socken in Hälsingland.

Månsson was born in Myssjö socken in Jämtland. He moved to Forsa socken in 1789 and was married the following year to Cecilia Andersdotter, a carpenter's daughter. They settled in her home village of Böle. Månsson began working as a painter in or before 1792, and was active for roughly half a century. According to oral tradition he was also a carpenter by trade.

As a decorative painter of furniture his regular motif was flowers and leaves, usually on a blue background. He would also make decorative "Forsa doors" in rococo-style, painted in white with thick, protruding door panels. The light blue tint used by Månnson was a mixture of indigo dye and white lead. For decorative painting he would also use darker shades of blue, from pure indigo or prussian blue, a dark red based on hematite, as well as orange and yellow from cinnabar and yellow ochre respectively. He would use techniques such as marbleizing and graining with skill.

The collections of Hälsinglands museum include an armoire painted by Månsson. It bears his signature and the year 1800 marked with graphite.

== Bibliography ==
- Nyström, Ingalill; Palmsköld, Anneli; Knutsson, Johan, eds. (2021). Hälsinglands inredningskultur (in Swedish). Göteborg: Makadam. doi:10.22188/kriterium.23. ISBN 9789170613562. ISSN 2002-2131.
