= Bollnäs Municipality =

Bollnäs Municipality Bollnäs kommun
- Municipality
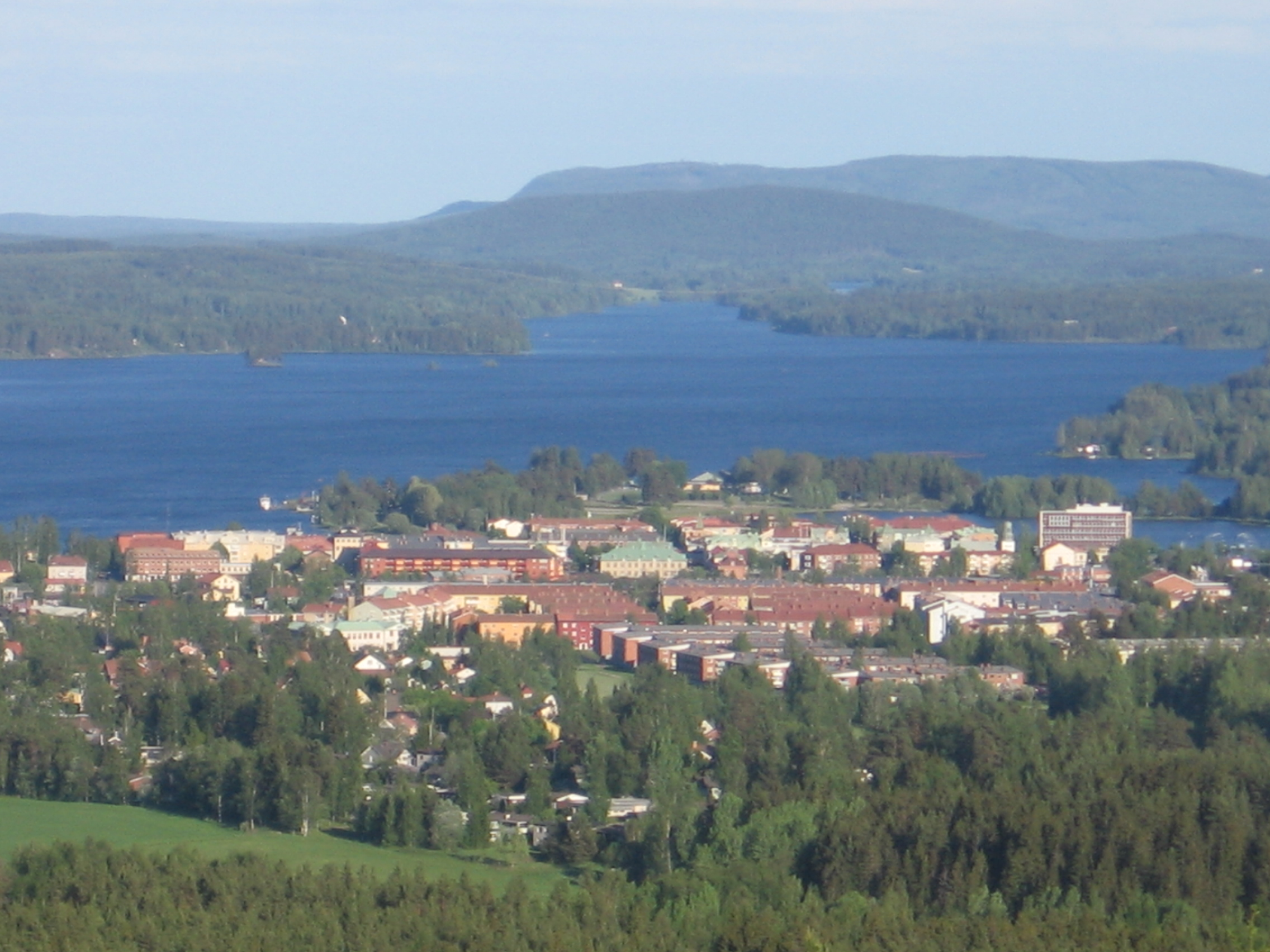

- Coat of arms

- Coordinates: 61°21′N 16°24′E
- Country: Sweden
- County: Gävleborg County
- Seat: Bollnäs

Area
  - Total: 1,976.7 km^{2} (763.2 sq mi)
  - Land: 1,814.35 km^{2} (700.52 sq mi)
  - Water: 162.35 km^{2} (62.68 sq mi)
- Area as of 1 January 2014.

Population (30 June 2025)
  - Total: 26,204
  - Density: 14.443/km^{2} (37.406/sq mi)
- Time zone: UTC+1 (CET)
  - Summer (DST): UTC+2 (CEST)
- ISO 3166 code: SE
- Province: Hälsingland
- Municipal code: 2183
- Website: www.bollnas.se

Bollnäs Municipality (Swedish: Bollnäs kommun) is a municipality in Gävleborg County, east central Sweden. Its seat is located in Bollnäs.

The municipality evolved during a series of local government reforms in the 1950s and 1970s. It consists of six original entities and has its present shape since 1977.

== Geography ==
Through the municipality, from north to southeast, runs the river Ljusnan. Among the localities situated at the river are Bollnäs and Arbrå. South of Bollnäs is the confluence of Ljusnan and its biggest tributary Voxnan.

Nearby the town of Bollnäs are several water areas with fish such as trout, bass and pike. The streams Ljusnan and Voxnan also offer fishing, as does the tributary lake Vågen in Bollnäs.

=== Localities ===
Population as of 2005:

- Acktjära
- Annefors
- Arbrå, 2,262.
- Arbrå-Norra Kyrkbyn, 127.
- Björtomta, 68.
- Bodåker-Norrbo, 68
- Bollnäs, 12,455.
- Edstuga, 65
- Flästa (norra delen), 52.
- Flästa (södra delen), 88.
- Freluga, 197.
- Glössbo, 97.
- Hallen, 167.
- Hertsjö, 85.
- Hällbo, 172.
- Höle, 53.
- Kilafors, 1,124.
- Lottefors, 391.
- Norrbyn, 79.
- Orbaden, 101.
- Parten-Hov, 61.
- Rengsjö, 272.
- Röste (del), 57.
- Röste-Norrborns industriområde, 70.
- Segersta, 329.
- Sibo, 351.
- Simeå, 77.
- Söräng-Norrbo, 58.
- Tomterna
- Vallsta, 280.
- Vik
- Västra Höle, 122.
- Växbo, 148.
- Österböle, 105.
- Östra Höle, 73.

=== Protected nature ===
A total of 1,461 acres (5.91 km^{2}) of the land in the municipality (0.8% of the municipality's area) are considered protected nature, for instance there are six nature reserves within the municipality's borders.

The reserves are:

- Djupsjön-Römmaberget – reserve since 1999. 86 ha large and located approximately 12 km southwest of Kilafors.
- Galvån – 22 ha large and located 6 km north of Bollnäs.
- Grossjöberget – reserve since 1998. 423 ha large and located approximately 20 km northeast of Bollnäs.
- Hästhagsberget – reserve since 2000. 28 ha large and located approximately 13 km south-southeast of Kilafors.
- Kölberget – reserve since 1980. 44 ha large and located approximately 7 km southeast of Kilafors.
- Stora Bolleberget – reserve since July 11, 2006. 99 ha large and located approximately 4 km northwest of Bollnäs.

Eight areas are included in Natura 2000. Four of these are also nature reserves – Djupsjön/Römmaberget, Galvån, Grossjöberget and Hästhagsberget – and the other four are Andersvallsslåtten, Haga, Myrsjömyrorna and Tomtas.

== Culture ==
Västerby hembygdsby in Rengsjö shows example of hälsingegårdar, old farms built in a way typical for the province of Hälsingland. Other examples of hälsingegårdar are Gästgivars in Vallsta, Erik-Larsgården in Arbrå and Kämpens in Bollnäs.

Outside Växbo, 15 km northeast of Bollnäs, Växbo lin ("Växbo linen"), Växbo kvarn ("Växbo Mill") and Trolldalen is situated. Växbo lin is the only remaining spinnery and weavers of linen in Scandinavia. Växbo kvarn is a water mill from the 19th century (reopened in 1985) where flour is ground using old techniques. Trolldalen displays old tools from the 19th century, tools used for processing linen.

Since 1997, the workgroup Kulturarv Hälsingegårdar has been active with the goal to get 15 villages/farms in Hälsingland declared World Heritage Sites by UNESCO. The villages and farms listed demonstrates examples of the traditional architecture of Hälsingland. On the list are among others Västerby hembygdsby, Växbo kvarn and Trolldalen. In 2006, the County Administrative Board of Gävleborg County handed over the documents concerning the issue to the Swedish National Heritage Board. UNESCO has received the inquiry and will make a decision in July 2009, at the earliest.

== Demographics ==
This is a demographic table based on Bollnäs Municipality's electoral districts in the 2022 Swedish general election sourced from SVT's election platform, in turn taken from SCB official statistics.

In total there were 20,585 Swedish citizens of voting age resident in the municipality. 51.6 % voted for the left coalition and 47.3 % for the right coalition. Indicators are in percentage points except population totals and income.

Location	Residents	Citizen adults	Left vote	Right vote	Employed	Swedish parents	Foreign heritage	Income SEK	Degree
Location			%	%					
Arbrå C	1,180	944	48.8	49.2	75	90	10	20,157	28
Arbrå-Flästa	1,535	1,182	45.6	52.7	75	91	9	21,815	26
Arbrå-Undersvik	1,458	1,199	50.8	48.2	83	94	6	23,056	35
Bollnäs C	1,859	1,707	55.4	43.8	69	87	13	18,144	25
Bollnäs-Björktjära	2,029	1,463	52.2	47.5	82	87	13	26,320	40
Bollnäs-Granberg	1,401	1,073	50.3	48.3	79	91	9	23,203	26
Bollnäs-Gärdet	2,491	1,714	63.0	36.2	60	51	49	17,098	24
Bollnäs-Hamre	1,826	1,179	52.8	46.1	71	67	33	22,275	29
Bollnäs-Hå	1,025	819	49.0	50.1	87	98	2	25,659	32
Bollnäs-Kilberg	1,827	1,380	57.0	42.6	83	90	10	26,006	34
Bollnäs-Lottefors	1,276	993	45.0	54.5	88	95	5	26,742	30
Bollnäs-Ren	1,383	1,050	56.4	43.1	83	88	12	25,709	33
Bollnäs-Sävsberg	1,841	1,403	49.8	48.9	77	80	20	23,153	35
Bollnäs-Söräng	961	759	48.3	50.9	86	96	4	26,998	38
Hanebo C	1,736	1,374	51.5	47.1	78	90	10	21,423	27
Hanebo-Segersta	1,627	1,337	50.4	48.4	88	96	4	26,025	33
Rengsjö	1,275	1,009	44.4	54.2	86	95	5	25,365	32
Source: SVT

== Politics ==
Result of the 2010 election:

- Moderate Party 22.32%
- Centre party 9.56%
- Liberal People's Party 5.39%
- Christian Democrats 4.25%
- Swedish Social Democratic Party 36.82%
- Left Party 6.82%
- Green Party 5.34%
- Sweden Democrats 8.42%
- Other parties 1.07%

== Transport ==
The Northern main line railway (Norra Stambanan) follows to great extent Ljusnan through the municipality. Bollnäs town holds the largest train station, the only station where inter-city trains stop. The local train X-tåget, which operates the route Gävle-Ljusdal, makes additional stops at Kilafors, Arbrå and Vallsta.

== Twin towns – sister cities ==
Bollnäs is twinned with:

- Flekkefjord, Norway
- Misburg-Anderten (Hanover), Germany
- Ogre, Latvia
- Shepton Mallet, England, United Kingdom

== Notable people ==
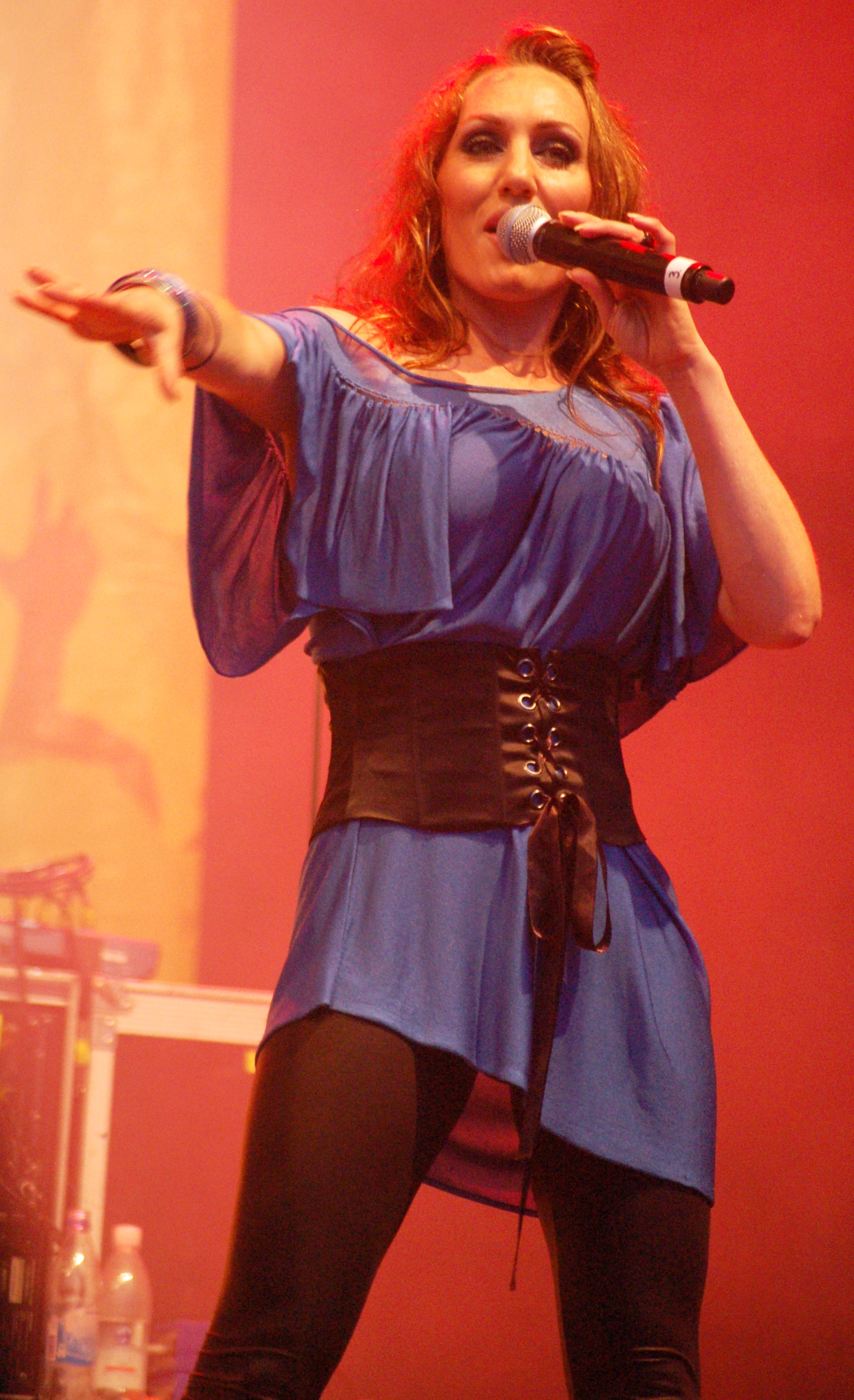
Lina Hedlund

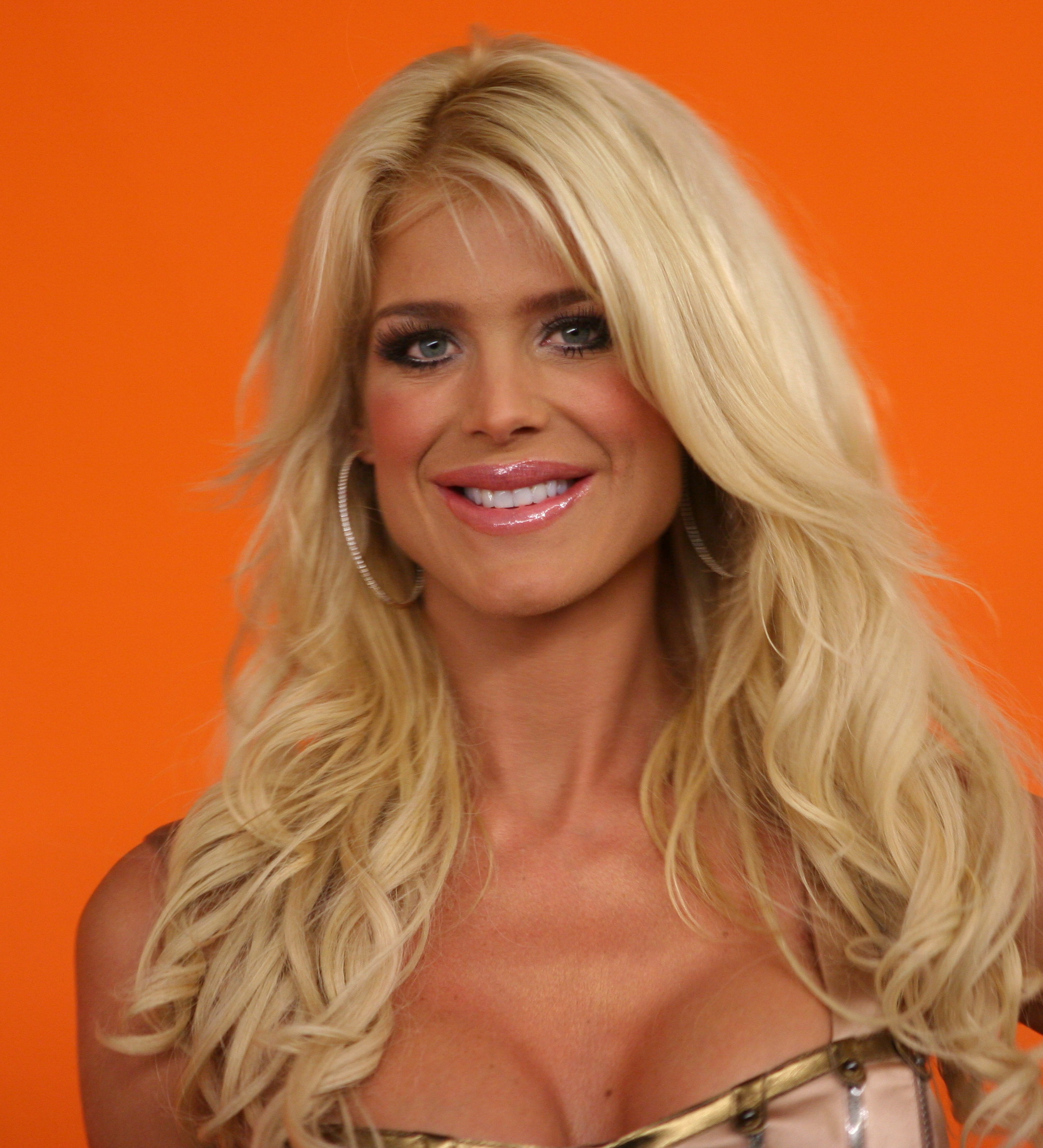
Victoria Silvstedt

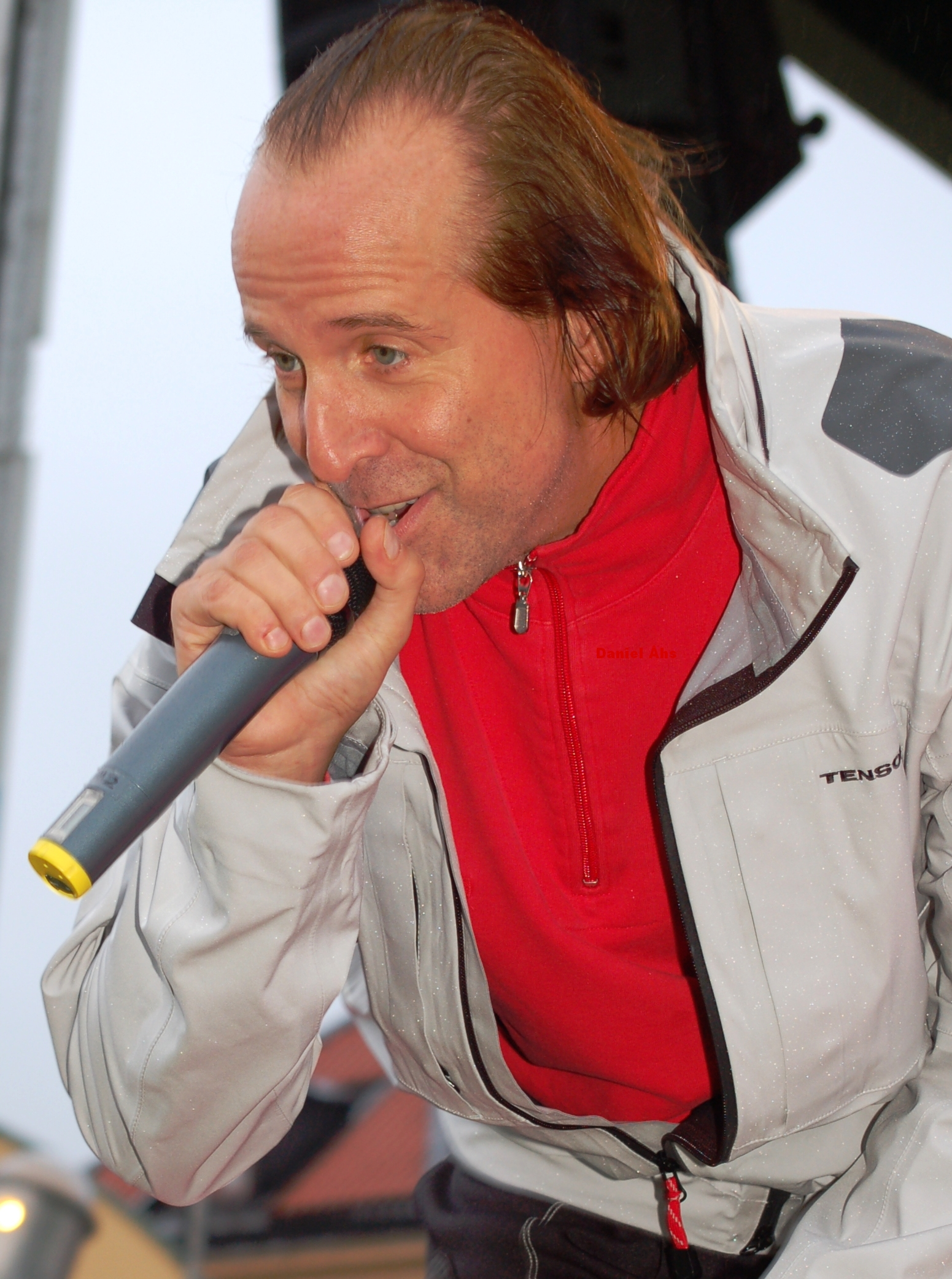
Peter Stormare

- Orienteering competitor Emma Engstrand (b. December 14, 1977) was born in, and grew up in, Bollnäs.
- Anders Eriksson (b. January 9, 1975), ice hockey player, was born in, and grew up in, Bollnäs.
- Ida Gawell-Blumenthal (1868–1953), "Delsbostintan", entertainer, was born in Arbrå.
- Åke "Stan" Hasselgård (October 4, 1922 – November 23, 1948), jazz clarinetist, grew up in Bollnäs, where his grave can be found.
- Hanna Hedlund, singer and TV show host, was born in Hanebo near Kilafors on January 21, 1975.
- Lina Hedlund, singer, was born in Hanebo near Kilafors on March 28, 1978.
- C.-H. Hermansson, politician, was born in Bollnäs on December 14, 1917.
- Anna-Karin Kammerling, swimmer, grew up in Bollnäs.
- Timo K. Mukka (1944–1973), Finnish writer, was born in Bollnäs, whereto his family had been evacuated from the Finnish province of Lapland region during the Lapland War.
- Gösta "Snoddas" Nordgren, singer and bandy player, was born in Arbrå on December 30, 1926.
- Thomas von Scheele, table tennis player, was born in Bollnäs on March 13, 1969.
- Victoria Silvstedt, super model, grew up in Bollnäs.
- Peter Stormare, actor, grew up in Arbrå.
- Per-Inge Tällberg, ski jumper, was born in Bollnäs on June 14, 1967.
- Staffan Tällberg, ski jumper, was born in Bollnäs on April 17, 1970.
- Nils Molin, Dynazty and Amaranthe vocalist, was born in Kilafors on October 18, 1988.
