= Delångersån =

Coordinates: 61.67276°N 17.19319°E

Location
- Country: Sweden

Physical characteristics
- Length: 155 km (96 mi)
- Basin size: 2,007.7 km^{2} (775.2 sq mi)

Delångersån is a river in Sweden. After Ljusnan and Voxnan, it is the third longest river in Hälsingland.
