= Acktjära =

Coordinates: 61°16′N 16°29′E

Acktjära is a small area located to the immediate south of Bollnäs, in Sweden. It comprises a collection of hamlets and farming lands spread between thick forests. Main access point are from the 83 road from Gävle, and from Kilafors, heading to Norrfly direction. There are many large wooden farm houses, typical of the Halsingland traditions. A quiet and remote area from October to March, snow can be deep in places, and the access roads can be poor in places.
