= Kilafors =

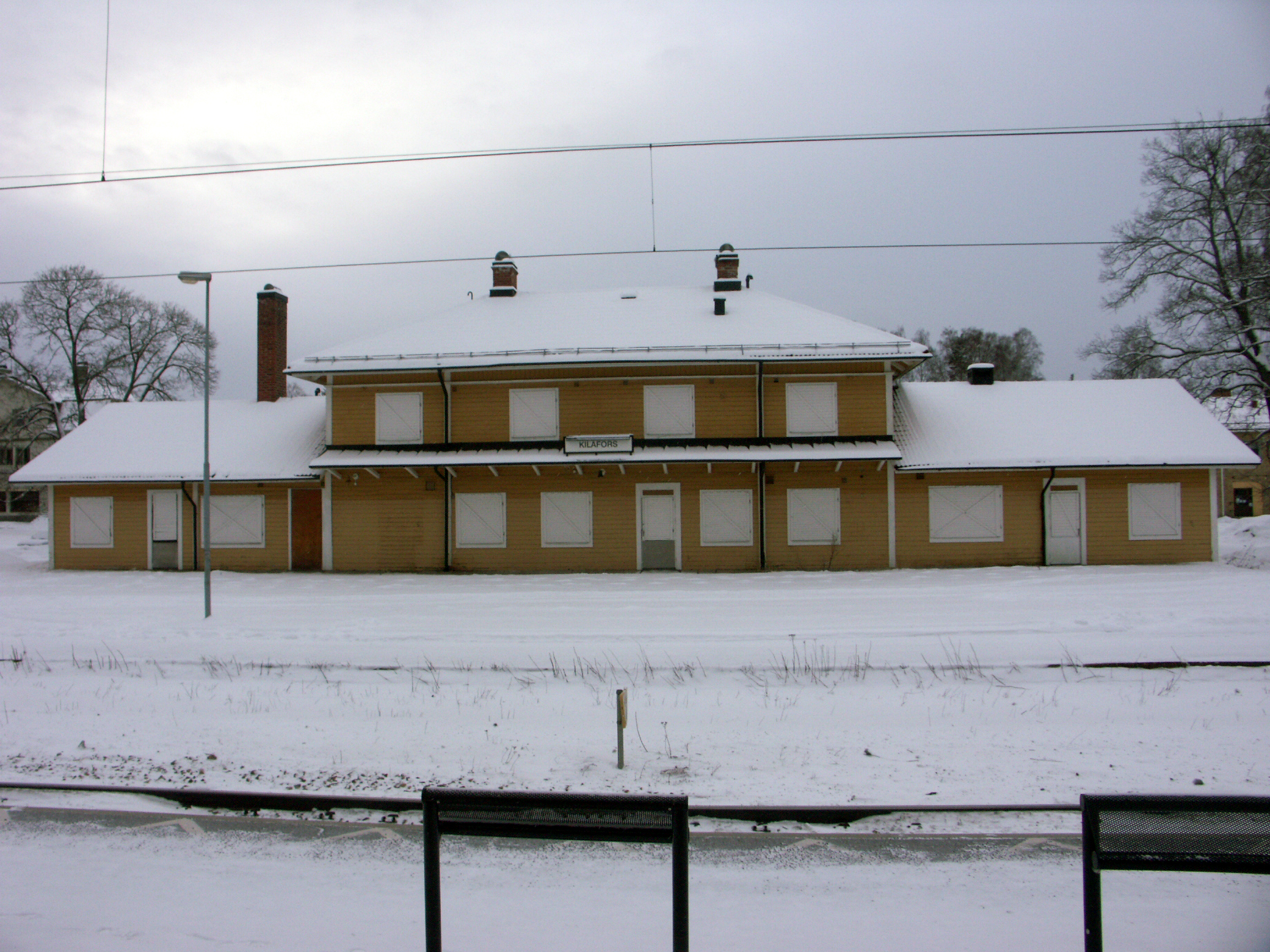
- Kilafors railway station

- Location within Sweden Gävleborg Location within Sweden
- Coordinates: 61°14′N 16°34′E
- Country: Sweden
- Province: Hälsingland
- County: Gävleborg County
- Municipality: Bollnäs Municipality

Area
  - Total: 1.62 km^{2} (0.63 sq mi)

Population (31 December 2010)
  - Total: 1,126
  - Density: 693/km^{2} (1,790/sq mi)
- Time zone: UTC+1 (CET)
  - Summer (DST): UTC+2 (CEST)

Kilafors is a locality situated in Bollnäs Municipality, Gävleborg County, Sweden with 1,126 inhabitants in 2010.

== Overview ==
The small town is located off of the 83 road from Gävle that runs through to Bollnäs and then further north. The town has a bank, two supermarkets, and two pay-by-card fuel stations. One hamburger restaurant, one Pizza and ala carte restaurant and one restaurant with a Swedish traditional menu. There is also an auto dealer, a couple of car repair shops and a cafe in the old railway station where there also is a clothing store. Also available is a hardware, paint, flower and TV and electronics store.
