= Lottefors =

- Location within Sweden Gävleborg Location within Sweden
- Coordinates: 61°25′N 16°24′E
- Country: Sweden
- Province: Hälsingland
- County: Gävleborg County
- Municipality: Bollnäs Municipality

Area
  - Total: 1.37 km^{2} (0.53 sq mi)

Population (31 December 2010)
  - Total: 392
  - Density: 285/km^{2} (740/sq mi)
- Time zone: UTC+1 (CET)
  - Summer (DST): UTC+2 (CEST)

Lottefors (Swedish pronunciation: [lɔtɛˈfɔʂː]) is a locality situated in Bollnäs Municipality, Gävleborg County, Sweden with 392 inhabitants in 2010.
