= Sibo, Sweden =

Sibo
- Location within Sweden Gävleborg Location within Sweden
- Coordinates: 61°13′N 16°36′E
- Country: Sweden
- Province: Hälsingland
- County: Gävleborg County
- Municipality: Bollnäs Municipality

Area
  - Total: 1.54 km^{2} (0.59 sq mi)

Population (2015)
  - Total: 281
  - Density: 183/km^{2} (470/sq mi)
- Time zone: UTC+1 (CET)
  - Summer (DST): UTC+2 (CEST)

Sibo is a locality situated in Bollnäs Municipality, Gävleborg County, Sweden with 281 inhabitants in 2015.

== Demographics ==
Historical population
Year	Pop.
1950	335
1960	480
1965	426
1970	411
1975	324
1980	339
1990	376
1995	371
2000	347
2005	351
2010	301
2015	281
