= Hilding Mickelsson =

Swedish photographer (1919–2002)

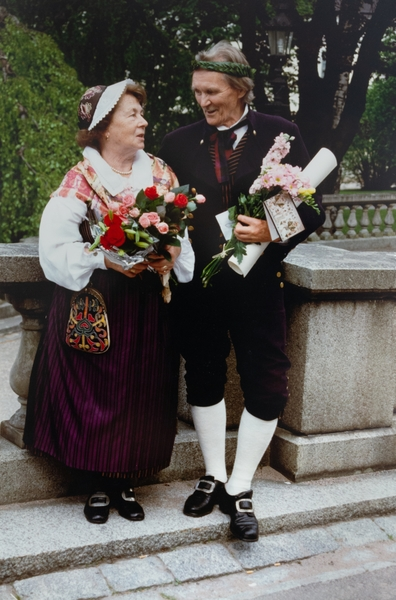
- Hilding Mickelsson (on the right) with his wife Adéle, 1991
- Born: 21 February 1919; Rengsjö, Sweden
- Died: 11 January 2002 (aged 82); Rengsjö, Sweden
- Occupation: Photographer
- Spouse: Adéle Mickelsson

Hilding Mickelsson (21 February 1919 – 11 January 2002) was a Swedish photographer and author, focused on documenting and preserving the nature, wildlife and cultural heritage in his home region Hälsingland.

== Biography ==
Born in 1919 in Rengsjö in south-western Hälsingland, Hilding Mickelsson grew up as a farmer's son. His father used to take him out into the forest from a very young age, where he learned to mimic birds. The natural and cultural heritage of his home region became the focus of his life and work: He spent his life documenting the wildlife, landscapes and historical buildings in Hälsingland.

At the age of 15, Hilding Mickelsson bought his first camera, a box camera that cost 9,75 SEK. At the end of the 1940s, he decided to focus on photography, after doing different jobs in his youth; among others, he worked as a consultant for the Rural Economy and Agricultural Society (Hushållningssällskapet). In 1947, he won the Swedish National Photography Contest (Riksfototävling) in the category A. Around the same time, he and his close friend Martin Holm had the idea to work on a photography book about Hälsingland, which they published with the title I Hälsingland in 1954. Hilding Mickelsson also contributed the photographs to Albert Viksten's book Mitt paradis, which was published five years later.

An essential part of his work was travelling across Sweden to present his photographs of Hälsingland, its landscape and historical buildings. He started with presentations after publishing his first book in 1954, and did so for decades: He showed his diapositives, explained the motives and their history and even imitated the depicted birds.

Hälsingland's nature played a special role in Hilding Mickelsson's work. Industrialization and urbanization changed rural Sweden in the second half of the 20th century; with the development of intensive agriculture, farms grew bigger and artificial fertilizers began to have an increasing impact on the environment. In the 1950s and 60s, when climate activism was not common at all, Hilding Mickelsson began raising concerns about environmental issues publicly, for example in local newspapers about local factories polluting the water. However, his engagement also created tensions in his local community, as many people's jobs depended on the local industry. Hence, he also lost commissions in local newspapers.

His engagement to preserve did not only include the Swedish nature, but also the cultural heritage of the Hälsingland region. In his work, he documented the traditions and intangible culture of his region. He also played a special role in taking photographs of the Hälsingegårdar, farmhouses of special historical value with rich decorations typical for Hälsingland. Many of them were torn down because of the industrialization of agriculture, new machinery like tractors, and a general increase of prosperity. By documenting their interiors and farmyards, Hilding Mickelsson raised awareness for the value of local cultural heritage. He explored villages systematically by bike, talked to locals, and thoroughly documented the typical paintings on the farmhouses' wooden walls. In many cases, his photographs are the only evidence left – in some cases, he documented the farmhouses just before they were torn down. In his lectures across Sweden, he highlighted the need to preserve the built environment of Hälsingland. The awareness he raised for the specific value of the Farmhouses of Hälsingland has contributed to their nomination as a World Heritage Site.

Another motive central to his work is the wildlife and landscape in Hälsingland. Patience was crucial for his work: He could sit up to 15 hours in trees to capture birds at the right moment. Asked about his approach, he said: "It takes 90 percent patience and 10 percent camera skills". In his photographs of landscapes, houses and wildlife, he balanced esthetics and documentation – he sometimes also arranged motives and edited his images manually, on the kitchen table. In 1960, his image "The great grey owl attacks" (Lappugglan anfaller) was featured in Life magazine.

He underlined on several occasions that his work and engagement for Hälsingland would not have been possible without the support of his wife, Adéle Mickelsson. She managed the life of the family, including the two sons, even in times when money was scarce or Hilding Mickelsson travelled for months for his lectures. In an interview about his environmental engagement, he said: "I did not get any pay, I don't know – it is really Adéle who kept me alive." Their son Olle described their relationship this way: "Without her, my father could have never been the person he was." In 1999, the year she died, he was quoted in a newspaper article: "Without Adéle, it wouldn't have been possible, she supported me and found solutions when money was tight."

In 1991, he was awarded an honorary doctorate in philosophy at Uppsala University.

== Legacy ==
Hilding Mickelsson's images have been printed in international photography magazines. In Europe alone, his photographs have been published in more than 20 countries.

The Hälsinglands Museum preserves his artistic heritage for the future. Since 2003, the museum has been digitizing a collection of about 150,000 of his photographs. More than 72.000 of his images are already available online.

In 2004, an association was founded to remember Hilding Mickelsson and his work, the Hilding Mickelsson Society (Hilding Mickelsson Sällskapet). They also organize the annual Hilding Day (Hildingdagen).

== Gallery ==
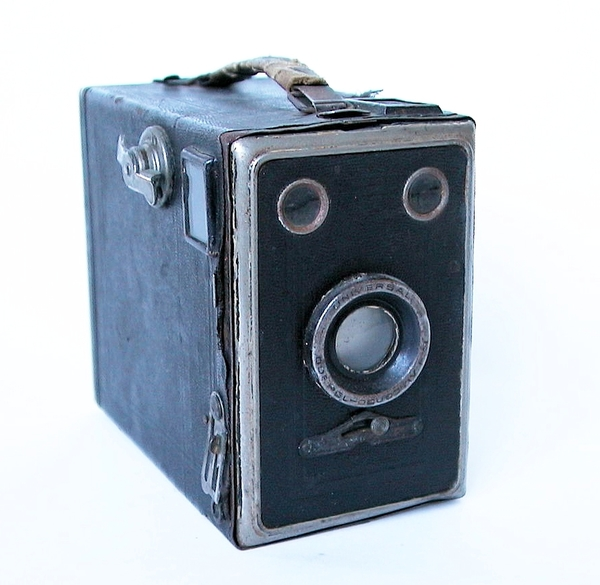
Hilding Mickelsson's first camera

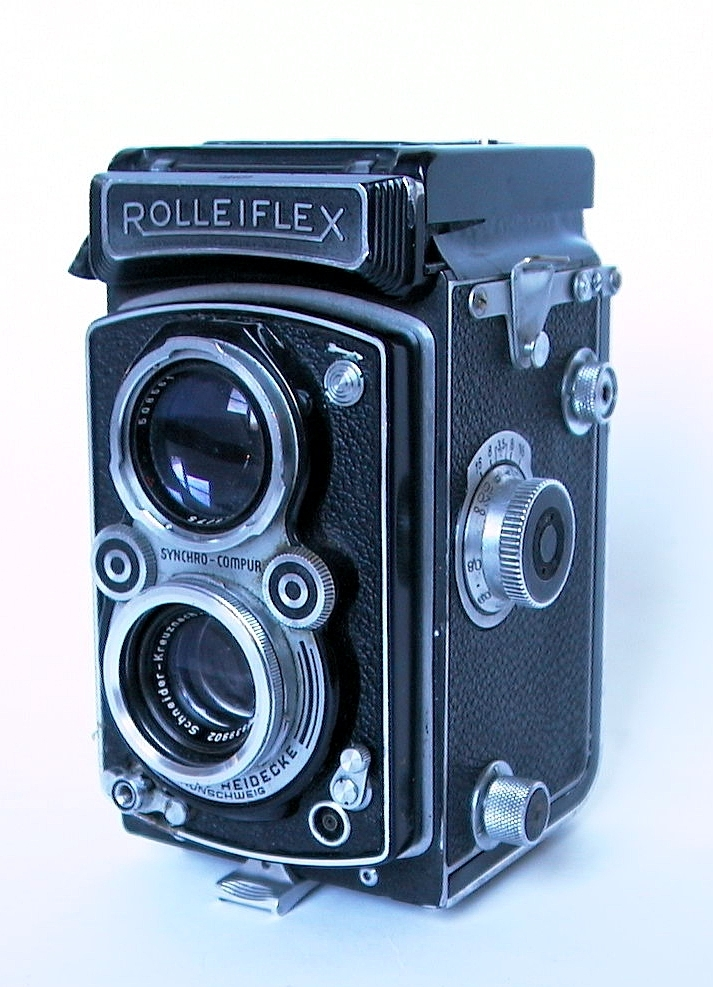
Together with his friend Martin Holm, Hilding Mickelsson bought this Rolleiflex in 1947

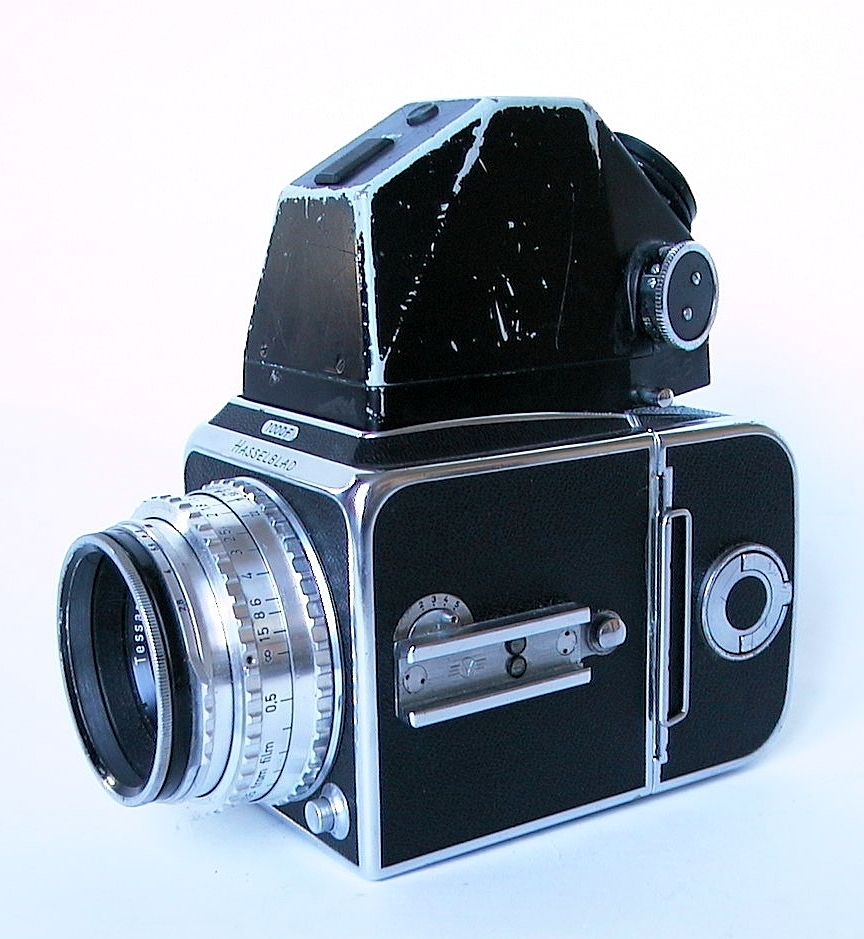
Hilding Mickelsson's Hasselblad camera that he used for more than 40 years

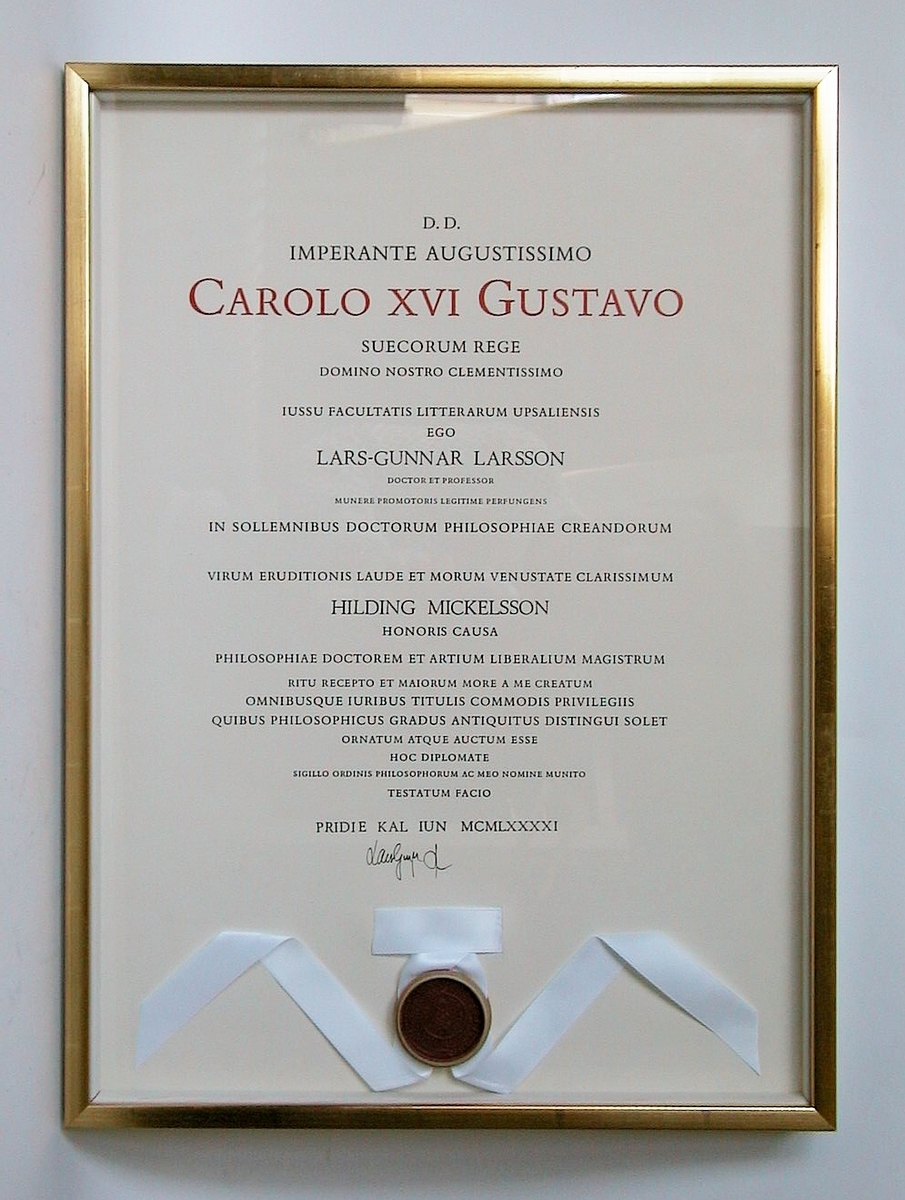
The diploma of his honorary doctorate in philosophy at the Uppsala University from 1991

== Bibliography ==
- Holm, Martin & Hilding Mickelsson (1954): I Hälsingland. Stockholm: Nordisk rotogravyr. ISBN 978-0521792608.
- Viksten, Albert (1959): Mitt paradis. Photographs by Hilding Mickelsson. Stockholm: Folket i bild.
- Holm, Martin (1963): I hälsingebygd. Photographs by Martin Holm & Hilding Mickelsson, text by Albert Viksten. Stockholm: Rabén & Sjögren.
- Svensson, Ingemar (1968): Hälsingemålningar. Photographs by Hilding Mickelsson. Stockholm: LT.
- Mickelsson, Hilding (1974): Kirre och kattugglan. Stockholm: Askild & Kärnekull. ISBN 9170084262.
- Mickelsson, Hilding (1975): Mieze und das Waldkäuzchen. Zug: Bergh. ISBN 3-88065-035-7.
- Dahn-Andersson, Irma (1977): Näverboken : handbok i näverflätning. Photographs by Hilding Mickelsson. Bollnäs: Inferi. ISBN 91-7492-004-9.
- Mickelsson, Hilding Mickelsson & Ingemar Svensson (1977): Friargåvor – och annat grant. Stockholm: LT. ISBN 9136010405.
- Nilsson-Öst, Per (1979): Per Nilsson-Öst, bildhuggaren. Photographs by Stig Andersson & Hilding Mickelsson. Stockholm: LT. ISBN 91-36-01332-3.
- Viksten, Albert (1980): Så kommer gryningen. Photographs by Hilding Mickelsson. Bjästa: CeWe-förlaget/CeWe-pool. ISBN 9175420074.
- Mickelsson, Hilding & Anna-Carin Åsbrink (1980): Målade korgar. Bollnäs: Inferi. ISBN 9174920251.
- Mickelsson, Hilding & A. Jönsson (1981): Såg du det landet : Hilding Mickelsson ser på Hälsingland. Söderala.
- Sosnierz, Margareta (1982): Väva band på enkelt sätt. Photographs by Hilding Mickelsson. Bollnäs: Inferi. ISBN 9174920383.
- Viksten, Albert (1983): Till Norrland. Photographs by Hilding Mickelsson. Bjästa: Cewe-förlaget. ISBN 9175421062.
- Holger, Lena (1985): Linet i länet. Photographs by Hilding Mickelsson. Gävle: Länsmuseet i Gävleborgs län. ISBN 9186244159.
- Mickelsson, Hilding & Margaretha Sundberg (1989): Hembygdsgårdar i Gästrikland och Hälsingland. Gävle: Gästrike-Hälsinge hembygdsförbund.
- Viksten, Sven (1990): I Kanadadrömmens spår : en resa i British Columbia. Photographs by Hilding Mickelsson. Färila: Ekeström. ISBN 9187688077.
- Mickelsson, Hilding (1993): Albert Vikstens värld. Färila: Ekeström. ISBN 9187688174.
- Mickelsson, Hilding (1998): Porches of pride : in the Swedish province of Hälsingland. Translated by Anne Cabling. Färila: Ekeström. ISBN 9187688352.
- Mickelsson, Hilding & Ingemar Svensson (1999): Hilding Mickelssons Hälsingland i bild. Gävle: Länsmuseet Gävleborg. ISBN 91-86244-72-8.
- Östlind, Niclas (2010): Fotografi, Hilding Mickelsson. Hudiksvall: Hälsinglands museum & Arena. ISBN 978-91-7843-351-3.
- Östlind, Niclas (2010): Photography Hilding Mickelsson. Translated by Andrew Young. Hudiksvall: Hälsinglands museum & Arena. ISBN 978-91-7843-352-0.
- Kindstrand, Gunilla (2019): Mästerfotografen : Hilding Mickelsson och hans Hälsingland. Hudiksvall: Helsingiana. ISBN 9789198515312.
