= Flottarkärlek =

Song by Harry Brandelius, Sölve Strand & Valle Söderlund
- Language: Swedish
- Released: 1948
- Genre: schlager
- Label: Cupol
- Songwriter: Hugo Lindh

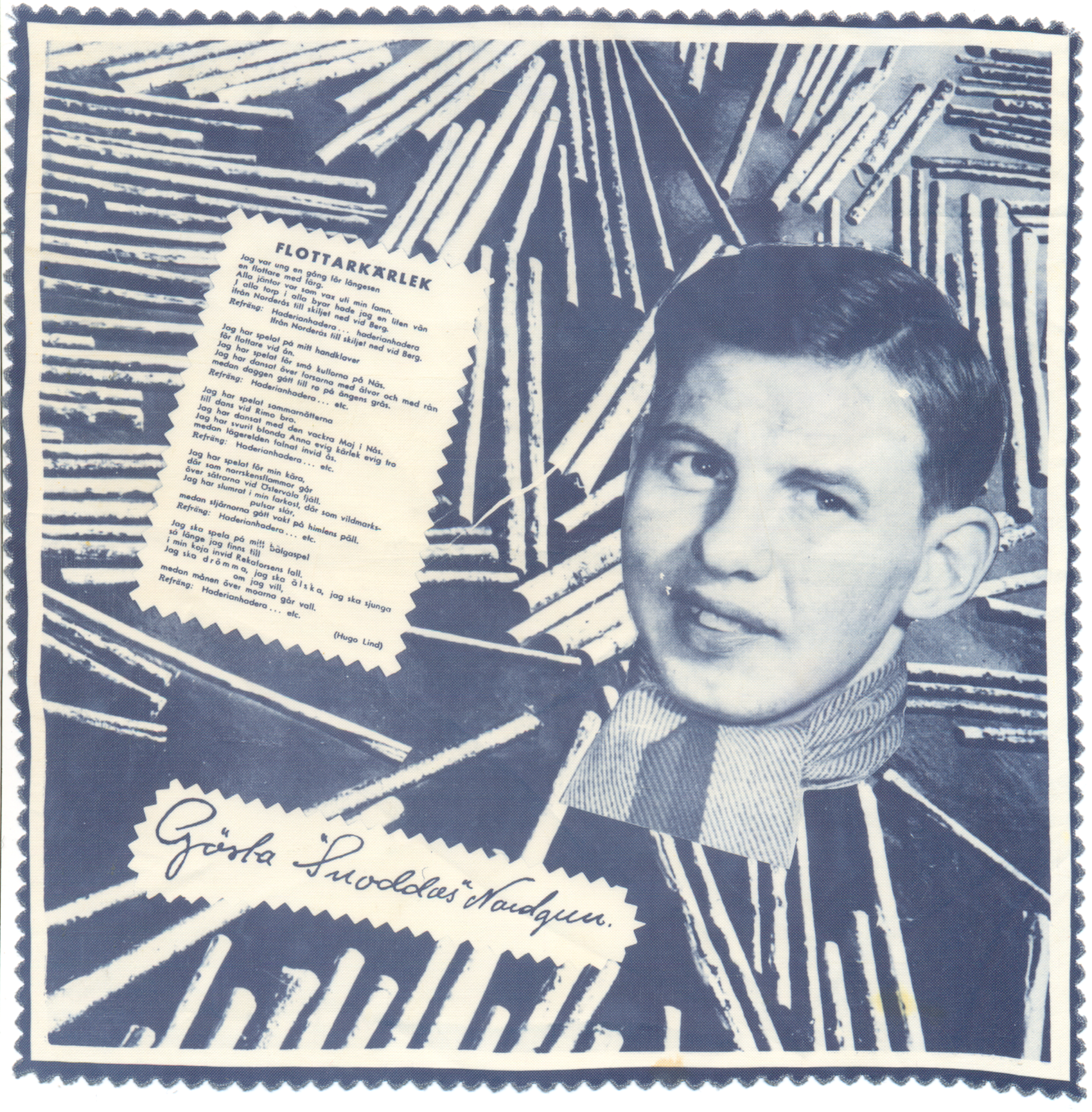
A silk canvas sold at one of Snodda's performances in the mid-1950s, with the lyrics to Flottarkärlek.

"Flottarkärlek" is a song written by Hugo Lindh, and performed live by Gösta "Snoddas" Nordgren on Saturday, 26 January 1952 in Swedish radio program Karusellen, and the song became a major hit in Sweden. The song is also known as "Haderian hadera", the opening lines of the refrain, but during the original live radio performance, these word don't appear. Instead, they appeared when the song was recorded for grammophone record for first time.

The song was originally recorded in 1948 by Harry Brandelius, Sölve Strand and Valle Söderlund, but those versions became no major success.

Povel Ramel recorded a parody version of the song, Snodderian, snoddera.

Monotones orkester from Eskilstuna, led by Åke Lindmark, recorded the song on the 1975 album Sköna Låtar. Kinels also recorded their own version of the song.

Roffe Wikström has also recorded a version, on the 2001 album Allting förändras.
