= Segersta =

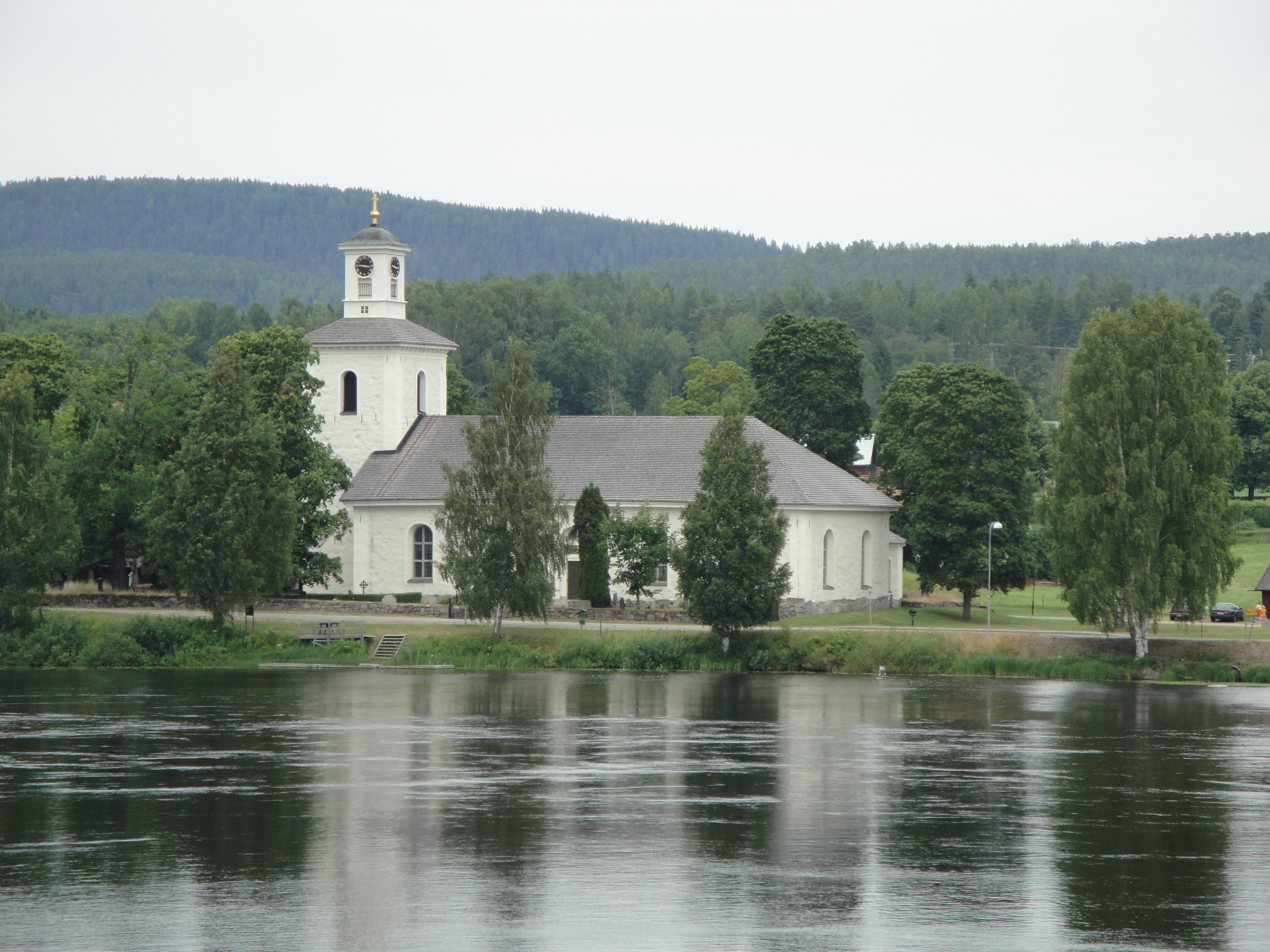
- Segersta

- Location within Sweden Gävleborg Location within Sweden
- Coordinates: 61°16′N 16°38′E
- Country: Sweden
- Province: Hälsingland
- County: Gävleborg County
- Municipality: Bollnäs Municipality

Area
  - Total: 1.40 km^{2} (0.54 sq mi)

Population (31 December 2010)
  - Total: 313
  - Density: 224/km^{2} (580/sq mi)
- Time zone: UTC+1 (CET)
  - Summer (DST): UTC+2 (CEST)

Segersta is a locality situated in Bollnäs Municipality, Gävleborg County, Sweden with 313 inhabitants in 2010.

Segersta church has racines from the 13th century.

Segersta was filming location for The Girl with the Dragon Tattoo in September 2010.
