= Karusellen (radio programme) =

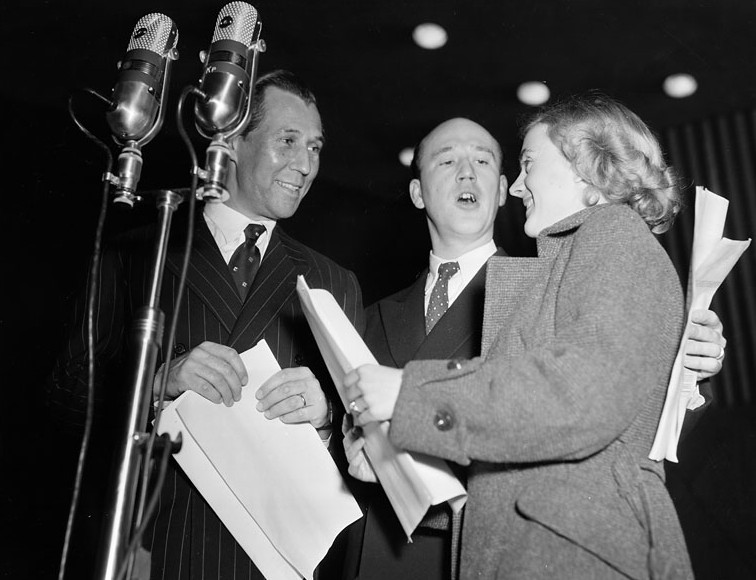
- Recording of the programme inside the Karlaplan Studion on 20 January 1951 with (from the left), Georg Rydeberg, Lennart Hyland and Maj Nordvander
- Other names: Lördagskväll
- Genre: entertainment
- Country of origin: Sweden
- Language: Swedish
- Home station: SR
- Hosted by: Lennart Hyland
- Original release: 27 January 1951

Karusellen, originally Lördagskväll, was a Sveriges Radio entertainment programme originally airing on 27 January 1951, and led by Lennart Hyland

One of the most famous events in the history of the programme was when Swedish bandy player Gösta Nordgren appeared on 26 January 1952. performing the song "Flottarkärlek" live.
