= Rengsjö SK =

Swedish football club

Rengsjö Sportklubb
- Full name: Rengsjö Sportklubb
- Nickname: RSK - Rengsjö SK
- Short name: RSK (Rengsjö Sportklubb)
- Founded: 1931
- Ground: Rengsjö IP and Solrosens IP; Rengsjö; Sweden
- Capacity: Around 1000
- Head coach: Anders Olsson
- League: Division 3 Södra Norrland, Division 5 (Second Team)
- Current Season: Division 3 Södra Norrland 2020
Home colours	Away colours

Rengsjö SK is a Swedish football club located in Rengsjö in Bollnäs Municipality, Gävleborg County .

== Background ==
Rengsjö Sportklubb (RSK) were founded on 16 March 1931. A previous club with the same name had started as Rengskö Skidklubb, a skiing club in 1907, and changed to this name in 1908 when other sports were taken up too, but the activities in this original Rengsjö SK ceased in 1913. Rengsjö SK won the 2009 Ljusnan Cup. Among notable players who previously played for the club is Johan Oremo.

Since their foundation Rengsjö SK has participated mainly in the middle and lower divisions of the Swedish football league system. The club currently plays in Division 3 Södra Norrland which is the fifth tier of Swedish football. They play their home matches at the Rengsjö IP in Rengsjö.

Rengsjö SK are affiliated to Hälsinglands Fotbollförbund.

== Recent history ==
In recent seasons Rengsjö SK have competed in the following divisions:

2011 – Division III, Södra Norrland
2010 – Division III, Södra Norrland
2009 – Division III, Södra Norrland
2008 – Division III, Södra Norrland
2007 – Division IV, Hälsingland
2006 – Division III, Södra Norrland
2005 – Division IV, Hälsingland
2004 – Division IV, Hälsingland
2003 – Division IV, Hälsingland
2002 – Division IV, Hälsingland
2001 – Division IV, Hälsingland
2000 – Division V, Hälsingland
1999 – Division V, Hälsingland

== Attendances ==
In recent seasons Rengsjö SK have had the following average attendances:

Season	Average attendance	Division / Section	Level
2005	Not available	Div 4 Hälsingland	Tier 5
2006	200	Div 3 Södra Norrland	Tier 5
2007	Not available	Div 4 Hälsingland	Tier 6
2008	258	Div 3 Södra Norrland	Tier 5
2009	267	Div 3 Södra Norrland	Tier 5
2010	276	Div 3 Södra Norrland	Tier 5

* Attendances are provided in the Publikliga sections of the Svenska Fotbollförbundet website.
