= Ida Gawell-Blumenthal =

Swedish writer and singer

Background information
- Also known as: Delsbostintan
- Born: Ida Albertina Gawell; November 4, 1869; Arbrå parish, Hälsingland, Sweden
- Died: May 14, 1953 (aged 83) Stockholm, Sweden
- Genre: Visa
- Years active: 1895–1953
- Spouse(s): Moritz Blumenthal (1898–1921)

Ida Albertina Gawell-Blumenthal (4 November 1869 – 14 May 1953) was a Swedish author, storyteller, singer and actress, known under the name Delsbostintan.

== Biography ==
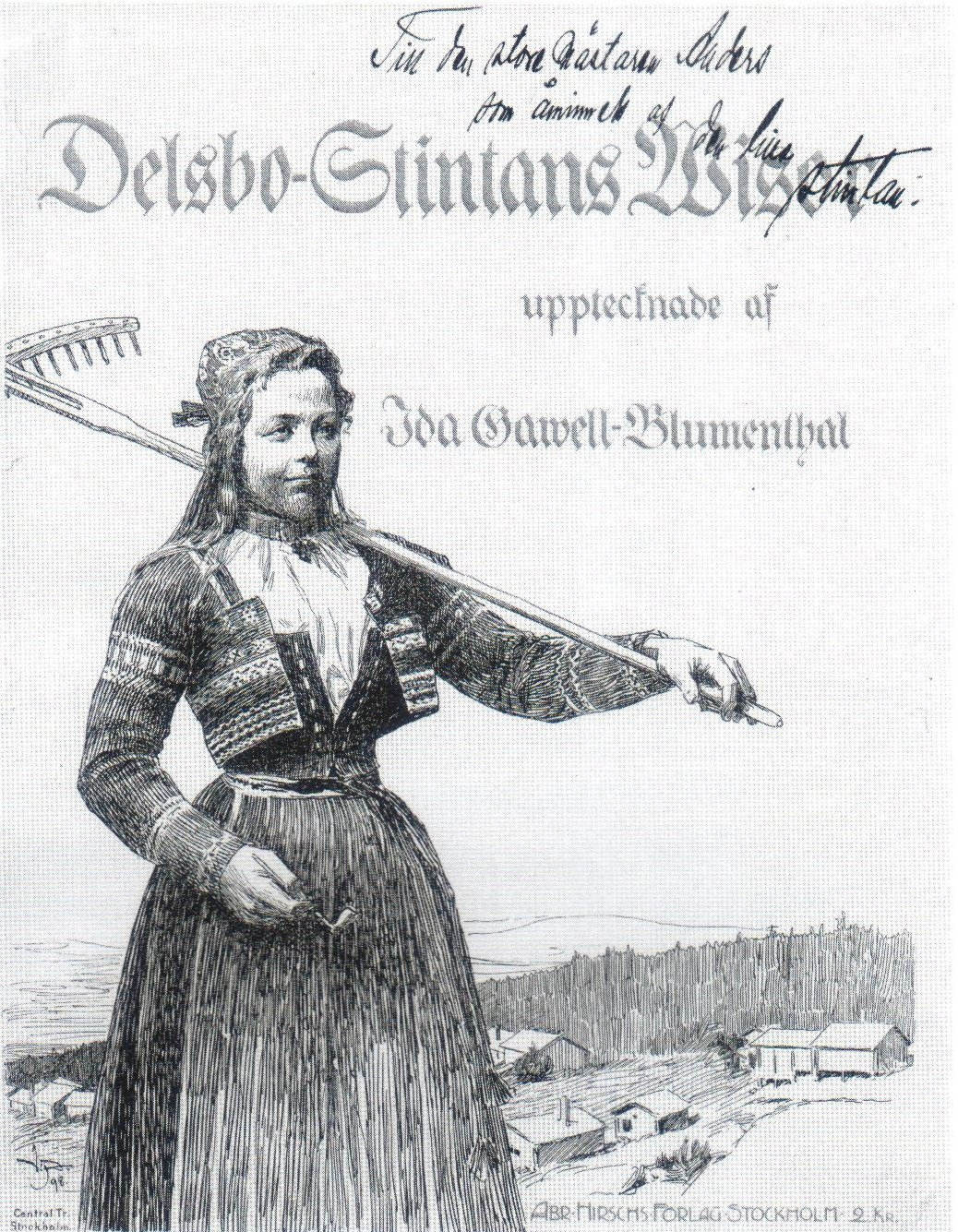
Cover of a collection of songs published in 1898.

Gawell-Blumenthal was the daughter of a priest from Arbrå. She is best known under the pseudonym Delsbostintan, under which she first performed in 1895 at Skansen as a performer of folk songs and stories from Hälsingland. She toured for many years in the Nordic countries as well as Swedish communities in the US, as a storyteller of humorous Hälsingland stories, often with musical illustrations on the spilåpipa and singing.

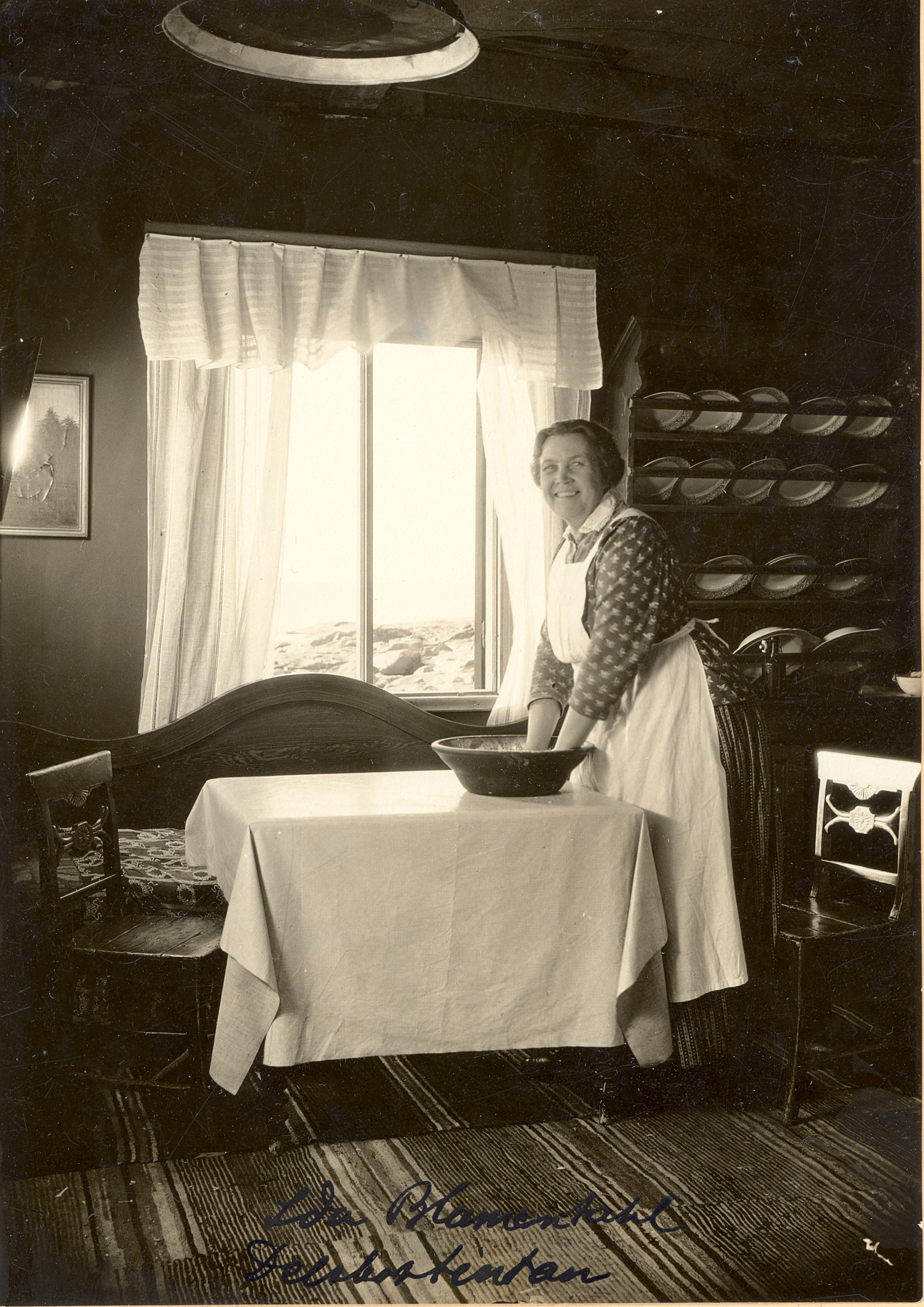
Ida "Delsbostintan" Gawell-Blumenthal (date unknown).

She moved to Stockholm in 1895 for studies at the Technical School and was married from 1898 to 1921 to the physician Moritz Blumenthal, who died in 1923.

== Awards ==
Ida Gawell-Blumenthal received the royal medal Litteris et Artibus in 1929. In 2003, on the 50th anniversary of her death, a statue of her was erected in the square in Delsbo.

== Bibliography ==
- Stintans amerikafärd. Stockholm: Skoglund. 1908.
- Från hembygd och färdvägar. Stockholm: Minerva. 1913.
- Delsbo / bilder af Bror Hillgren. Stockholm: Norstedt. 1915.
- Jag vill hjälpa Er att fira jul / Delsbostintan. Stockholm. 1934.
- Norrlänningar i Stockholm / huvudredaktör Ida Gawell-Blumenthal. Stockholm: Bengt Lindbergs förlagsaktiebolag. 1943.
- Hälsingehistorier. Stockholm: Wahlström & Widstrand. 1945.
- MEA. Stockholm: Centraltryckeriet. 1984.

== Filmography ==
- 1923 – En rackarunge
- 1923 – Eld ombord
- 1926 – Fänrik Ståls sägner-del I
- 1926 – Fänrik Ståls sägner-del II
- 1936 – Kungen kommer
- 1944 – Delsbostintan berättar (short film)
- 1944 – Hemma i Hälsingland (short film)
- 1944 – En erfaren husmors råd (short film)
- 1945 – Det var en gång...
- 1949 – Delsbostintan språkar litet om Lång-Lasse (short film)
- 1962 – Fåfängans marknad
