= Vallsta =

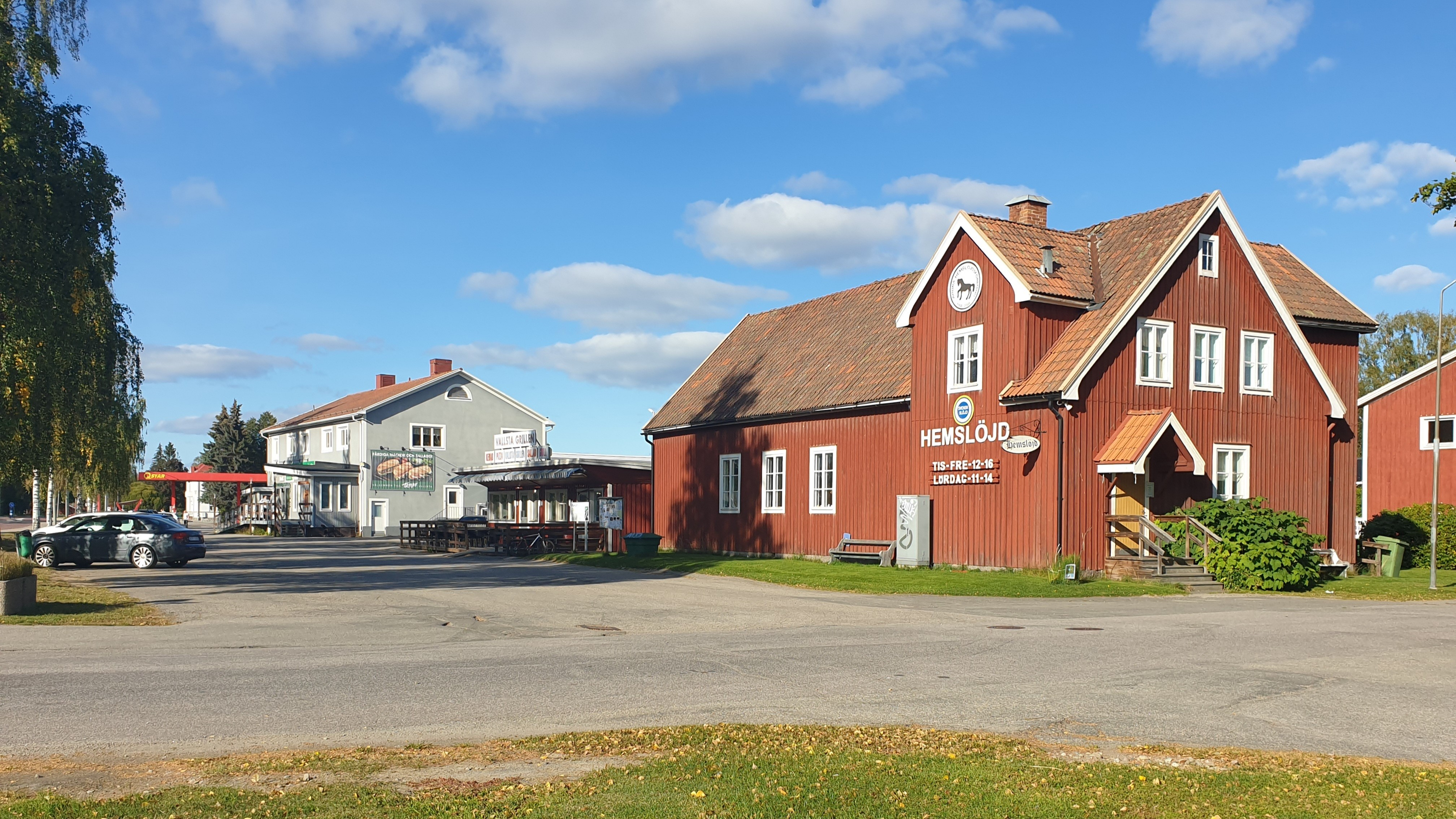
- Vallsta 2021

- Location within Sweden Gävleborg Location within Sweden
- Coordinates: 61°32′N 16°22′E
- Country: Sweden
- Province: Hälsingland
- County: Gävleborg County
- Municipality: Bollnäs Municipality

Area
  - Total: 0.69 km^{2} (0.27 sq mi)

Population (31 December 2010)
  - Total: 277
  - Density: 399/km^{2} (1,030/sq mi)
- Time zone: UTC+1 (CET)
  - Summer (DST): UTC+2 (CEST)

Vallsta is a locality situated in Bollnäs Municipality, Gävleborg County, Sweden with 277 inhabitants in 2010.
