= Arbrå BK =

Swedish football club

- Full name: Arbrå Bollklubb
- Founded: 1928
- Ground: Arbrå IP; Arbrå; Sweden
- Chairman: Ingvar Persson
- League: Division 4 Hälsingland
Home colours	Away colours

Arbrå BK is a Swedish football club located in Arbrå.

== Background ==
Arbrå BK currently plays in Division 4 Hälsingland, the sixth tier of Swedish football. They play their home matches at the Arbrå IP in Arbrå.

The club is affiliated to Hälsinglands Fotbollförbund.

The women's soccer team played in the Swedish top division in 1981.

== Season to season ==
In their most successful period Arbrå BK competed in the following divisions:

Season	Level	Division	Section	Position	Movements
1960	Tier 4	Division 4	Hälsingland	3rd	
1961	Tier 4	Division 4	Hälsingland	2nd	
1962	Tier 4	Division 4	Hälsingland	1st	Promoted
1963	Tier 3	Division 3	Södra Norrland	6th	
1964	Tier 3	Division 3	Södra Norrland Nedre	4th	
1965	Tier 3	Division 3	Södra Norrland Nedre	10th	Relegated
1966	Tier 4	Division 4	Hälsingland	9th	
1967	Tier 4	Division 4	Hälsingland	2nd	
1968	Tier 4	Division 4	Hälsingland	6th	
1969	Tier 4	Division 4	Hälsingland	3rd	
1970	Tier 4	Division 4	Hälsingland	2nd	
1971	Tier 4	Division 4	Hälsingland	1st	Promotion Playoffs – Promoted
1972	Tier 3	Division 3	Norra Svealand	6th	
1973	Tier 3	Division 3	Norra Svealand	11th	Relegated
1974	Tier 4	Division 4	Hälsingland	1st	Promoted
1975	Tier 3	Division 3	Södra Norrland	9th	
1976	Tier 3	Division 3	Södra Norrland	9th	
1977	Tier 3	Division 3	Södra Norrland	9th	
1978	Tier 3	Division 3	Södra Norrland	6th	
1979	Tier 3	Division 3	Södra Norrland	9th	
1980	Tier 3	Division 3	Södra Norrland	7th	
1981	Tier 3	Division 3	Södra Norrland	9th	
1982	Tier 3	Division 3	Södra Norrland	12th	Relegated
1982	Tier 4	Division 4	Hälsingland	3rd	

* League restructuring in 2006 resulted in a new division being created at Tier 3 and subsequent divisions dropping a level.

In recent seasons Arbrå BK have competed in the following divisions:

Season	Level	Division	Section	Position	Movements
2006*	Tier 6	Division 4	Hälsingland	5th	
2007	Tier 6	Division 4	Hälsingland	9th	
2008	Tier 6	Division 4	Hälsingland	7th	
2009	Tier 6	Division 4	Hälsingland	7th	
2010	Tier 6	Division 4	Hälsingland	10th	
2011	Tier 6	Division 4	Hälsingland		

* League restructuring in 2006 resulted in a new division being created at Tier 3 and subsequent divisions dropping a level.
