= Rengsjö =

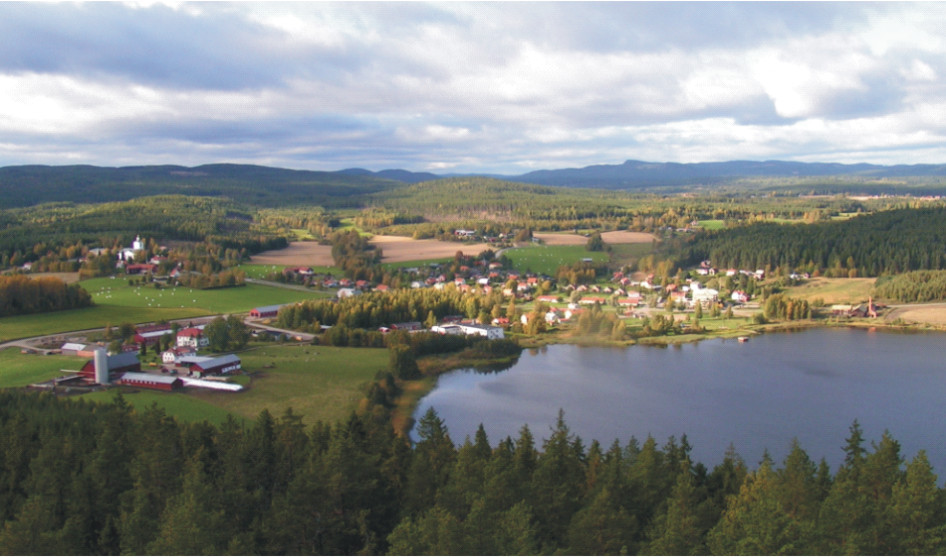
- View over Rengsjö

- Location within Sweden Gävleborg Location within Sweden
- Coordinates: 61°22′N 16°36′E
- Country: Sweden
- Province: Hälsingland
- County: Gävleborg County
- Municipality: Bollnäs Municipality

Area
  - Total: 0.59 km^{2} (0.23 sq mi)

Population (31 December 2010)
  - Total: 264
  - Density: 451/km^{2} (1,170/sq mi)
- Time zone: UTC+1 (CET)
  - Summer (DST): UTC+2 (CEST)

Rengsjö is a locality situated in Bollnäs Municipality, Gävleborg County, Sweden with 264 inhabitants in 2010. The area includes agricultural land and residential zones, with local infrastructure supporting a small population. Outdoor activities such as hiking and skiing are common due to the natural terrain. Rengsjö is part of the historical province of Hälsingland.

== Sports ==
The following sports clubs are located in Rengsjö:

- Rengsjö SK
