= Lennart Hyland =

Swedish radio and television presenter (1919–1993)

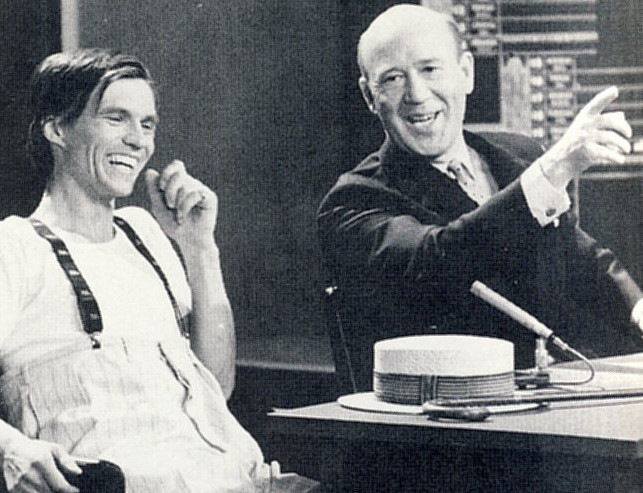
- Lennart Hyland (right) with actor Per Oscarsson on Hylands hörna in 1966
- Born: Otto Lennart Hyland; 24 September 1919; Tranås, Sweden
- Died: 15 March 1993 (aged 73); Stockholm, Sweden
- Occupations: TV-show host Journalist
- Known for: Hylands hörna
- Spouse: Brita "Tuss" Hyland (m. 1950–1993)

Otto Lennart Hyland (24 September 1919 – 15 March 1993), was a Swedish TV-show host and journalist and one of the most popular and renowned TV personalities in the history of Swedish television. His biggest success as an entertainer was unquestionably the show Hylands hörna ("Hyland's corner"), that aired from 1962 on Sveriges Television.

Initially, it was a radio show at Sveriges Radio, but due to its success and popularity, the production was moved to Sveriges Television in 1962 where it aired until 1983. During its 21-year run, it became a veritable institution of Swedish popular entertainment.

== Early life ==
Hyland was born on 24 September 1919 in Tranås, Säby Parish, Sweden, the son of Otto Hyland, a merchant, and Maja Moback.

== Career ==
Hyland worked as a journalist at Tranås-Posten in 1937, at Karlskoga Tidning from 1938 to 1943, and at Barometern from 1943 to 1945. He worked as a host and reporter at the Radiotjänst (named Sveriges Radio from 1957) from 1945 to 1969, and as a host at TV 1 at Sveriges Television from 1969 to 1983.

Hyland worked as a public and sports reporter, and he had his own program series including Med mikrofonen i andras yrken, Fönsterrevyn (1946), Lördagskväll (1947–1950), Karusellen (1951–1954). He was also the host of various entertainment programs on TV, for example, Hylands hörna. Hyland also hosted the TV shows Morokulien and Karusellen, and charity programs such as Röda fjädern.

== Personal life ==
In 1950, Hyland married Brita "Tuss" Nielsen (1927–2016), the daughter of Fredrik Nielsen and Elsa (née Johansson). They had two children; Per (born 1954) and Fredrik (born 1955). Tuss Hyland was sister of the actor Gunnar Nielsen.

== Death ==
Hyland died on 15 March 1993 in Engelbrekt Parish, Stockholm.
