= Ljusnan =

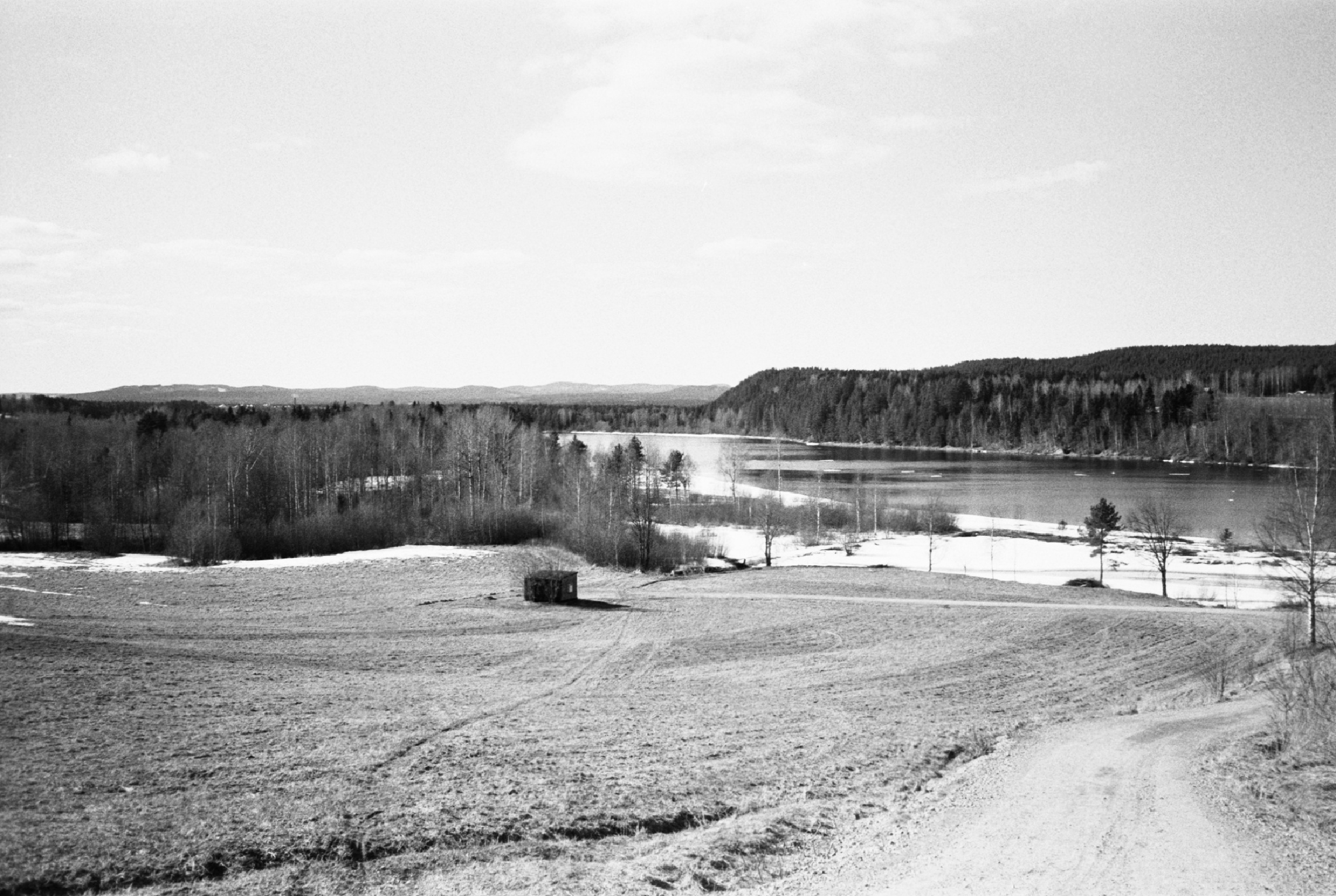
- Ljusnan seen from the small town of Färila

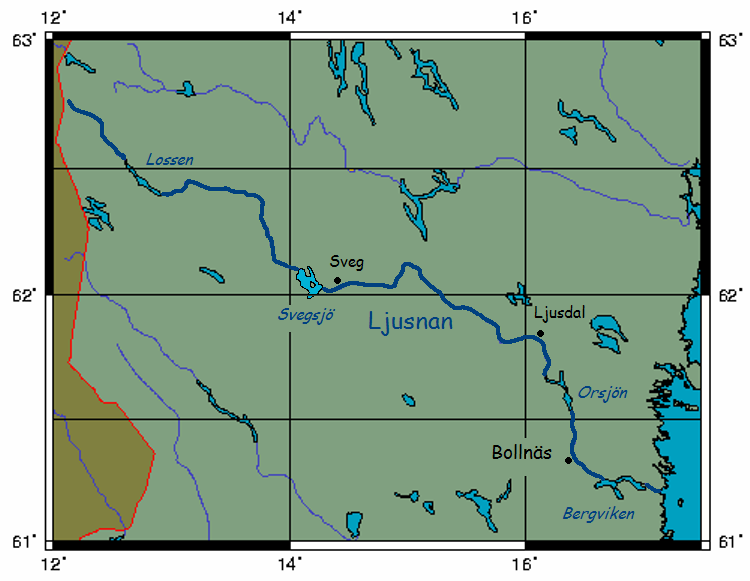

Location
- Country: Sweden

Physical characteristics
- Mouth: Bothnian Sea
  - coordinates: 61°12′12″N 17°07′57″E
  - elevation: 0 m (0 ft)
- Length: 430 km (270 mi)
- Basin size: 19,828.1 km^{2} (7,655.7 sq mi)
- Discharge
  - average: 230 m^{3}/s (8,100 cu ft/s)
  - maximum: 2,500 m^{3}/s (88,000 cu ft/s)

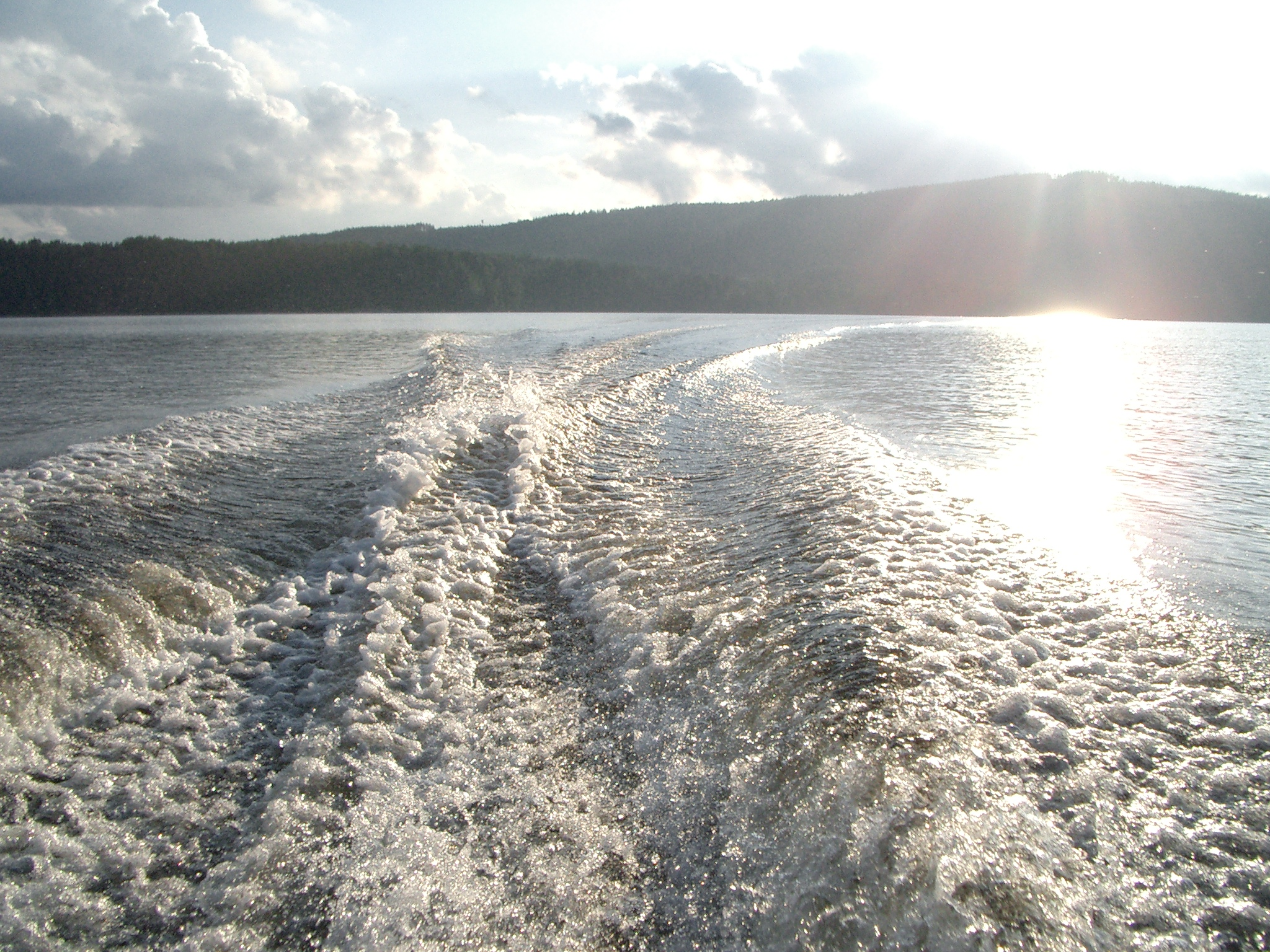
Ljusnan seen from a motorboat between Arbrå and Vallsta.

Ljusnan (from Old Norse: Lusn — light) is a river in Sweden, which is 440 kilometers long. The river starts in northwestern Härjedalen and then continues throughout the province into Hälsingland all the way to the Bothnian Sea. The biggest tributary is Voxnan. The river is heavily used for hydropower with 18 hydro powerplants. During 2001 Ljusnan produced 4,5 TWh.
