= Voxnan =

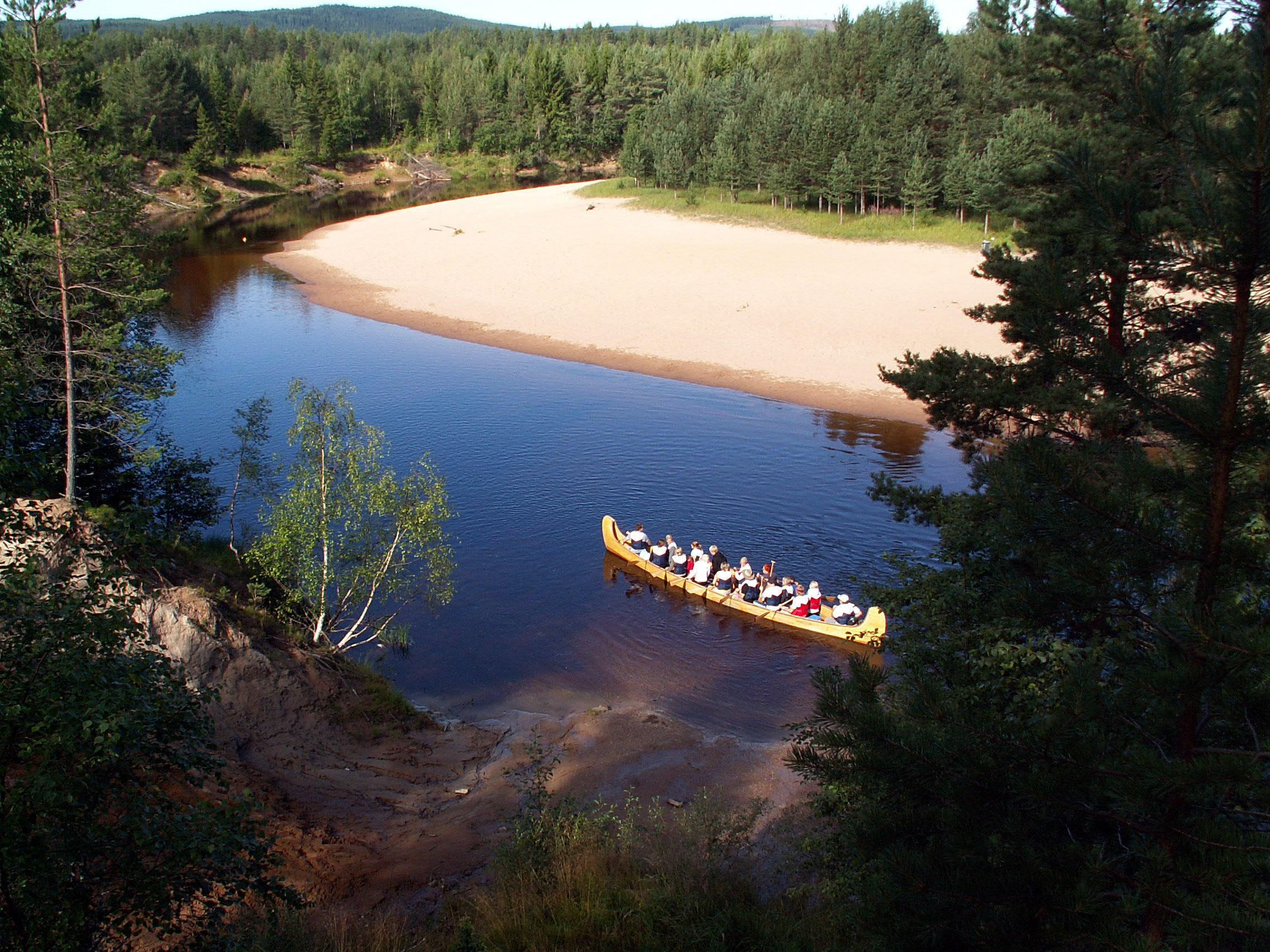
- Voxnan at Frostkilen, 2005.

Location
- Country: Sweden

Physical characteristics
- Mouth: Ljusnan
  - location: Bollnäs
  - coordinates: 61°19′01″N 16°26′37″E
- Length: 150 km (93 mi)
- Basin size: 3,140 km^{2} (1,210 sq mi)
- Discharge
  - average: 33 m^{3}/s (1,200 cu ft/s)

Voxnan (Swedish pronunciation: [ˈvɔ̂ksnan]) is a river in Hälsingland, Sweden. It passes through the provinces of Härjedalen and Dalarna as well, albeit these sections are only a small part of the river, with it mainly being in Hälsingland. It stretches for 150 kilometers, originating from the lake Siksjön in Härjedalen with its mouth being the lake Varpen, which is a part of the river Ljusnan.

== Hydropower ==
The upper portion of the Voxnan does not have any hydroelectric power station hindering its path, making it an important nature conservation area as such is quite rare for a rivers in the area. Although as the river starts to pass increasingly populated areas the amount of dams and powerstations start to increase, with a total of 10 producing on average 162 GWh.
