= Tomterna =

Human settlement in Gävleborg County, Sweden

Coordinates: 61°38′N 16°21′E

Tomterna is a populated place in Bollnäs Municipality, Gävleborg County, Sweden.
