= Harry Brandelius =

Swedish singer

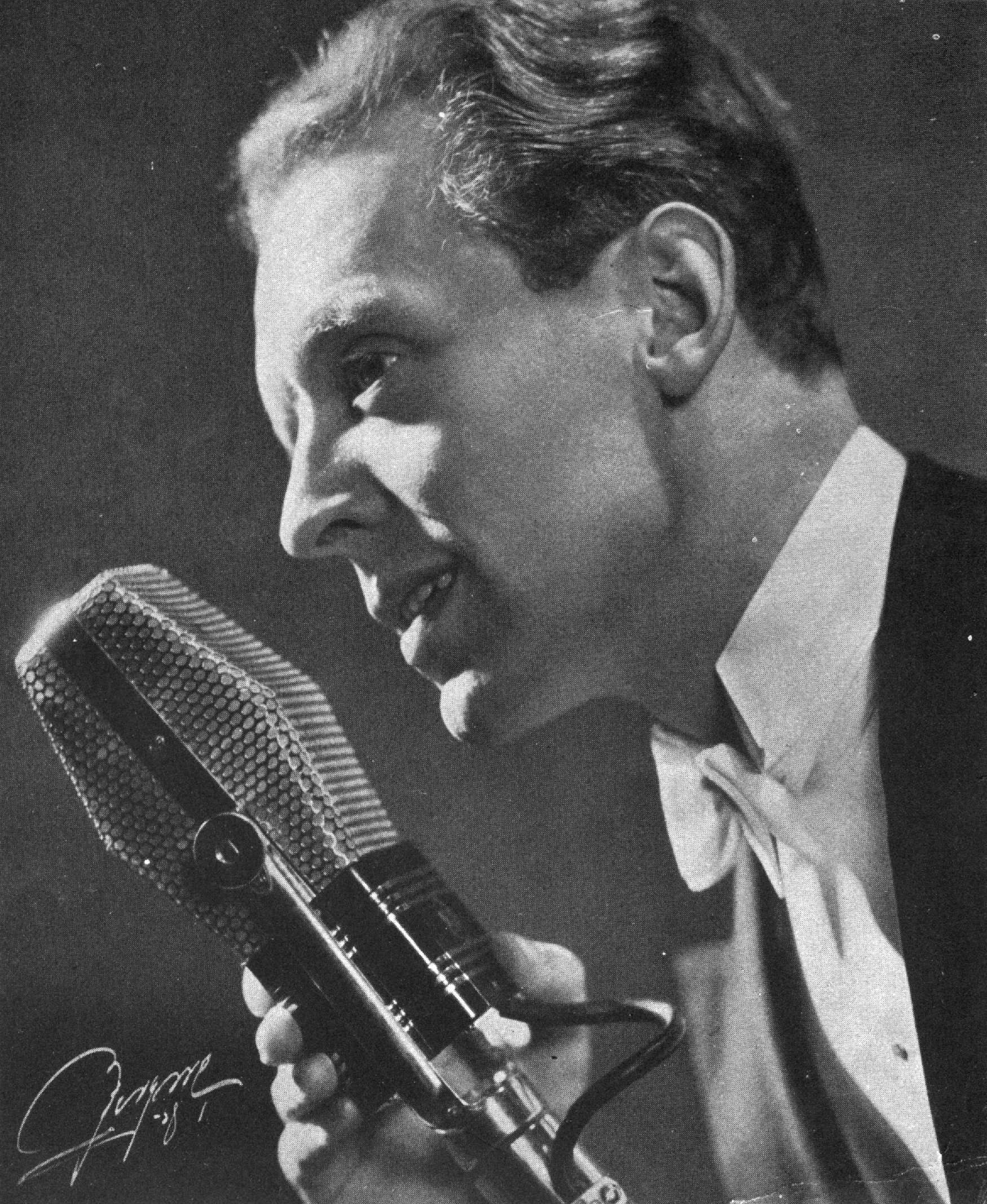
- Harry Brandelius by the late-1930s

Background information
- Birth name: Harry Torbjörn Brandelius
- Born: 14 June 1910; Stockholm, Sweden
- Died: 5 September 1994 (aged 84); Stockholm, Sweden
- Occupation: singer

Harry Torbjörn Brandelius (14 June 1910 – 5 September 1994) was a Swedish singer of schlager music. He made his debut as a gramophone singer in 1932 with Midt i natten (Miss i nassen) accompanied by Folke Andersson's orchestra (His Master's Voice X 4026), and was one of the most popular of his generation. Many of his songs had sailor's themes. Brandelius achieved his breakthrough with the song Han hade seglat för om masten ("He had sailed fore of the mast"), written by Martin Nilsson, in 1938. Later on he also succeeded well with Nordsjön ("The North Sea"), Med en enkel tulipan ("With a simple tulip"), En sjöman älskar havets våg ("A sailor loves the wave of the sea") and Vind i seglen ("Wind in the sails").

He was married three times. His second wife was Ingalill Rossvald (1944–1964), his accompanist (accordion) for many years. They made several records together. Among them was a Swedish version of San Antonio Rose in 1952.

== Filmography ==
- Storm Over the Skerries (1938)
- Melodin från Gamla Stan (1939)
- Hur tokigt som helst (1949)
