= Stan Hasselgård =

Swedish jazz clarinetist

Sten Åke Henry "Stan" Hasselgård (October 4, 1922 – November 23, 1948) was a Swedish jazz clarinetist. Hasselgård was heavily influenced by Benny Goodman, and he played swing jazz in his early years, before exploring bebop shortly before his death.

== Biography ==
Hasselgård was born in Sundsvall. His father was John Levin Johansson (1886–1923), a son of Johan Ludvig Persson who later changed his name to John Hasselgård; his mother was Linda Köhler (1893–1979), a daughter of Magnus Wilhelm Köhler. Åke Hasselgård's father died in a hunting accident in Gällivare when Åke was only a year old. Hasselgård grew up in Bollnäs, Sweden, and began playing clarinet at the age of 16. He attended college at the University of Uppsala and played in the Royal Swingers there. In 1945, he played in a quintet led by Arthur Österwall, and founded a new Royal Swingers group that year. From 1946 to 1947, he played with Simon Brehm's sextet alongside Gösta Eriksson (piano), Bror Hansson (trumpet), Kurt Wärngren (guitar) and Bertil Frylmark (drums).

Having achieved international renown, he moved in 1947 to New York City, and played there on 52nd Street with Jack Teagarden and Max Roach. Under the stage name Stan Hasselgard, he made his acclaimed recording of Swedish Pastry, and in 1948 he joined Benny Goodman's septet, alongside Wardell Gray, Mary Lou Williams and others. His last recording session occurred on November 18, 1948; on November 23 he was killed in a car crash outside the city of Decatur, Illinois, at the age of 26. He was buried in the family plot of District Judge John Larson (1883–1962) in Bollnäs churchyard. Larson had become Hasselgård's stepfather when his mother remarried in 1929, six years after she had been widowed.

== Recognition ==
Filmmaker Jonas Sima's 1983 documentary, Åke Hasselgård Story, portrayed Hasselgård's life and career. At the 2002 Swedish Jazz Celebration at Stockholm's Nalen entertainment centre, he was posthumously recognized with a Golden Django Award. Since 2000, Bollnäs municipality has also disbursed an annual scholarship in his name, awarded to a young jazz musician with ties to Bollnäs.

Hasselgård was the "famous bop clarinetist [who] had died in an Illinois car-crash recently" the memory of which spooked Sal Paradise on his journey to Chicago in Jack Kerouac's On the Road (1957). Kerouac also mentions him by name (as "Hassel") several times in other chapters.

Hasselgård was second cousin to former Swedish Prime Minister Ingvar Carlsson; their common great-grandparents were Per August Magnusson (1822–1899) and his wife Kristina Charlotta Hjellström (1817–1880). Hasselgård's niece Åsa Hasselgård-Rowe is married to Richard Rowe, an Australian who served simultaneously as ambassador (2003–2007) to Sweden, Estonia, Finland, Latvia and Lithuania.
