= Bollnäs =

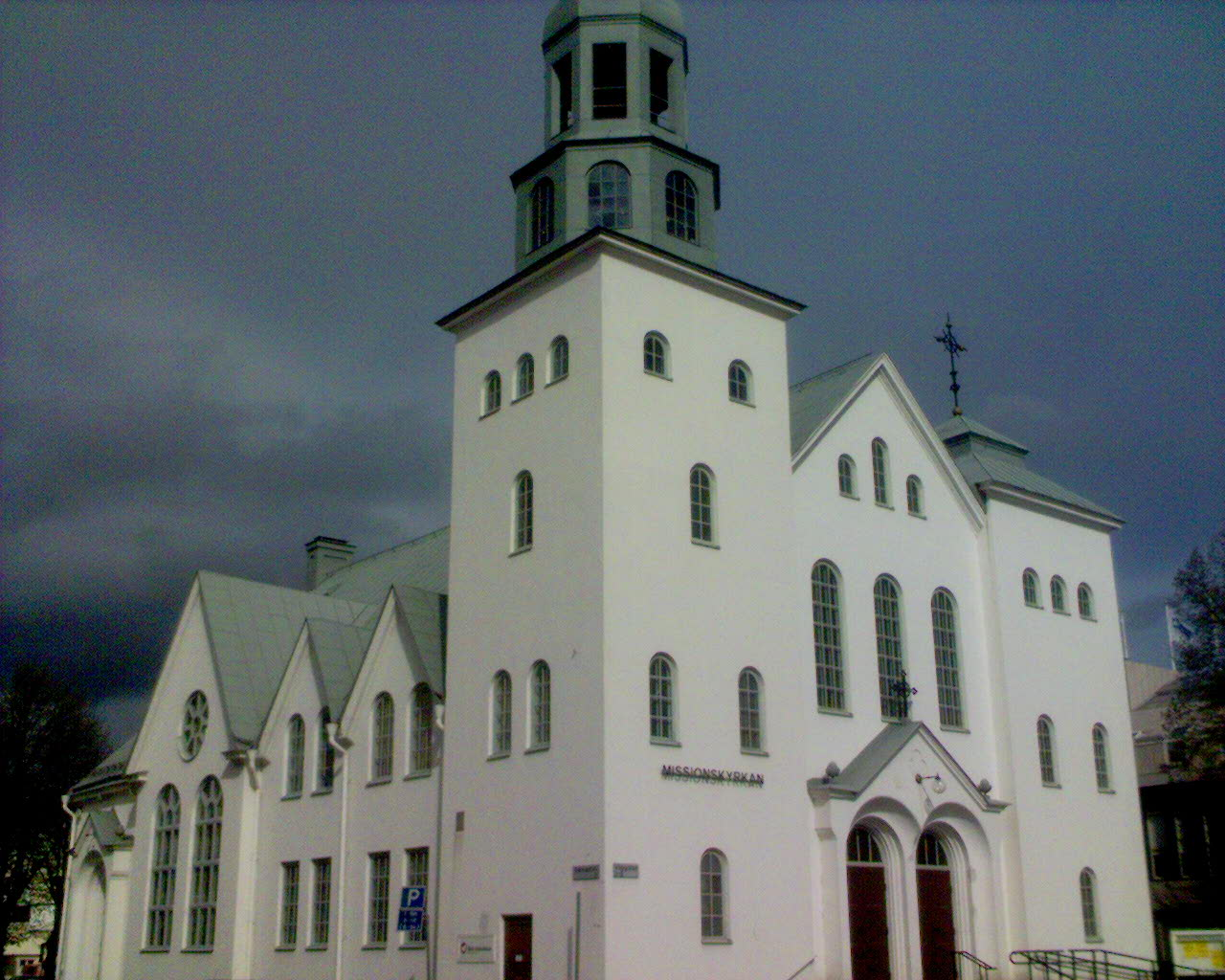
- Bollnäs Missionskyrka

- Location within Sweden Gävleborg Location within Sweden
- Coordinates: 61°20′53″N 16°23′41″E
- Country: Sweden
- Province: Hälsingland
- County: Gävleborg County
- Municipality: Bollnäs Municipality
- Charter: 1942

Area
  - Total: 12.87 km^{2} (4.97 sq mi)
- Elevation: 53 m (174 ft)

Population (31 December 2010)
  - Total: 12,381
  - Density: 998/km^{2} (2,580/sq mi)
- Time zone: UTC+1 (CET)
  - Summer (DST): UTC+2 (CEST)
- Postal code: 821 xx
- Area code: (+46) 278
- Website: Official website

Bollnäs (Swedish pronunciation: [ˈbɔ̌lːnɛs]) is a Swedish locality and the seat of Bollnäs Municipality, in Gävleborg County, Sweden. It has about 14,000 inhabitants.

== History ==
The first recording of Bollnäs in writing is from 1312 when a vicar named Ingemund referred to it as Baldenaes, meaning "the large isthmus," referring to the isthmus into a nearby lake. Before becoming known as Bollnäs, its name was Bro By (lit. Bridge Village).

Bollnäs has a station along the Northern Railway line (Norra Stambanan), which it was connected to in 1878. The town became a main base for further northern expansion of the railway. In 1884, it became a primary maintenance and repair workshop for the railway. The railway was the largest employer in Bollnäs for the greater part of the 20th century, until the 1990s when it was closed due to its location being no longer optimal. Bollnäs became a city in 1942, nowadays an honorary title without administrative significance.

Bollnäs is twinned with Shepton Mallet, England.

== Sports ==
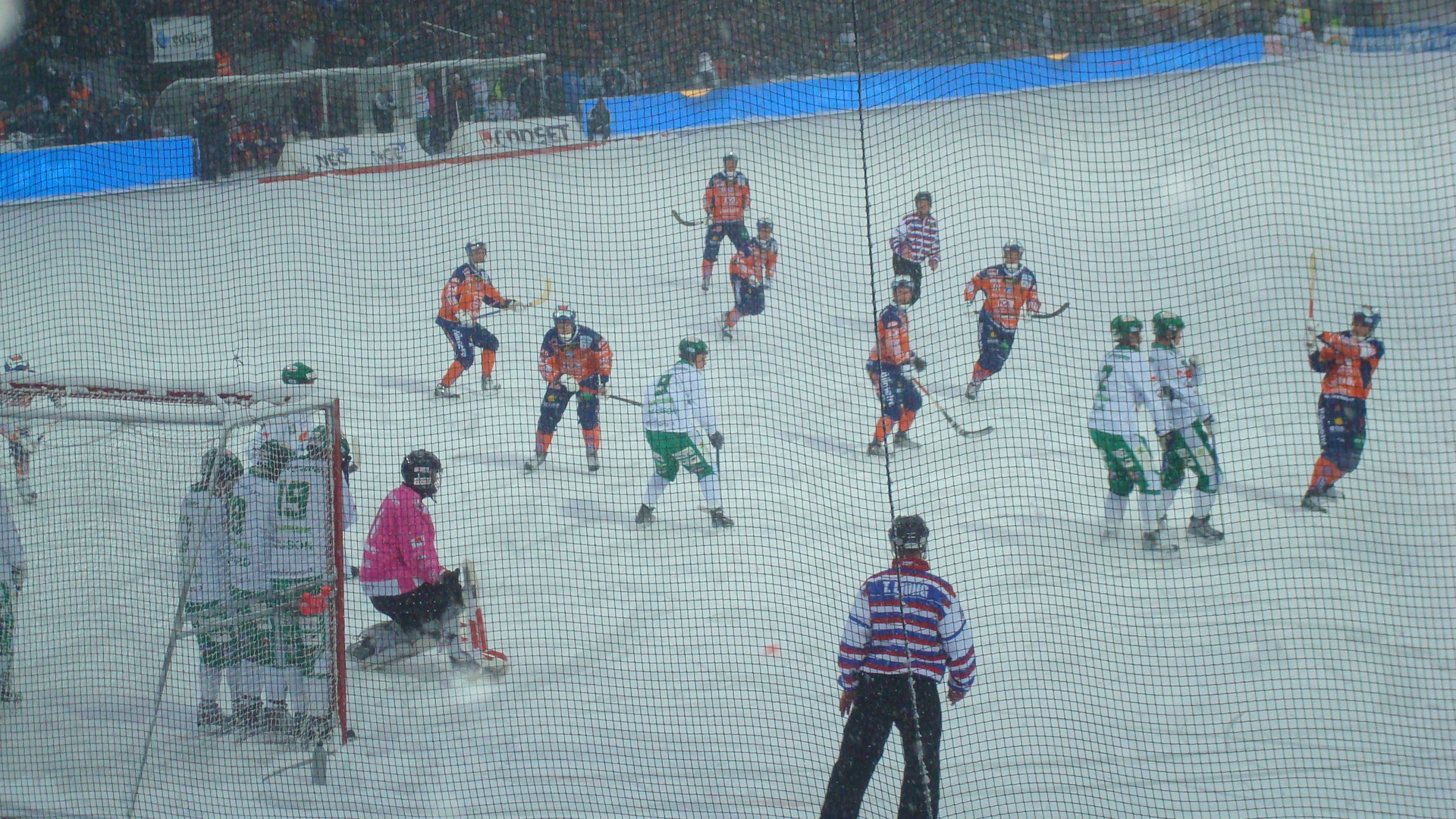
Bollnäs in the final

Bandy is the locality's most popular sport. Bollnäs GIF play in the highest division Elitserien. In 2010, they reached the Swedish final for the first time since 1956. In 2011, they reached the finals and lost in overtime after a controversial offside penalty. In 2017, the team, once again, reached the final and lost against their derby rival Edsbyns IF.

Rehns BK started as a bandy club, but now focuses on orienteering and cross-country skiing.

== Points of interest ==
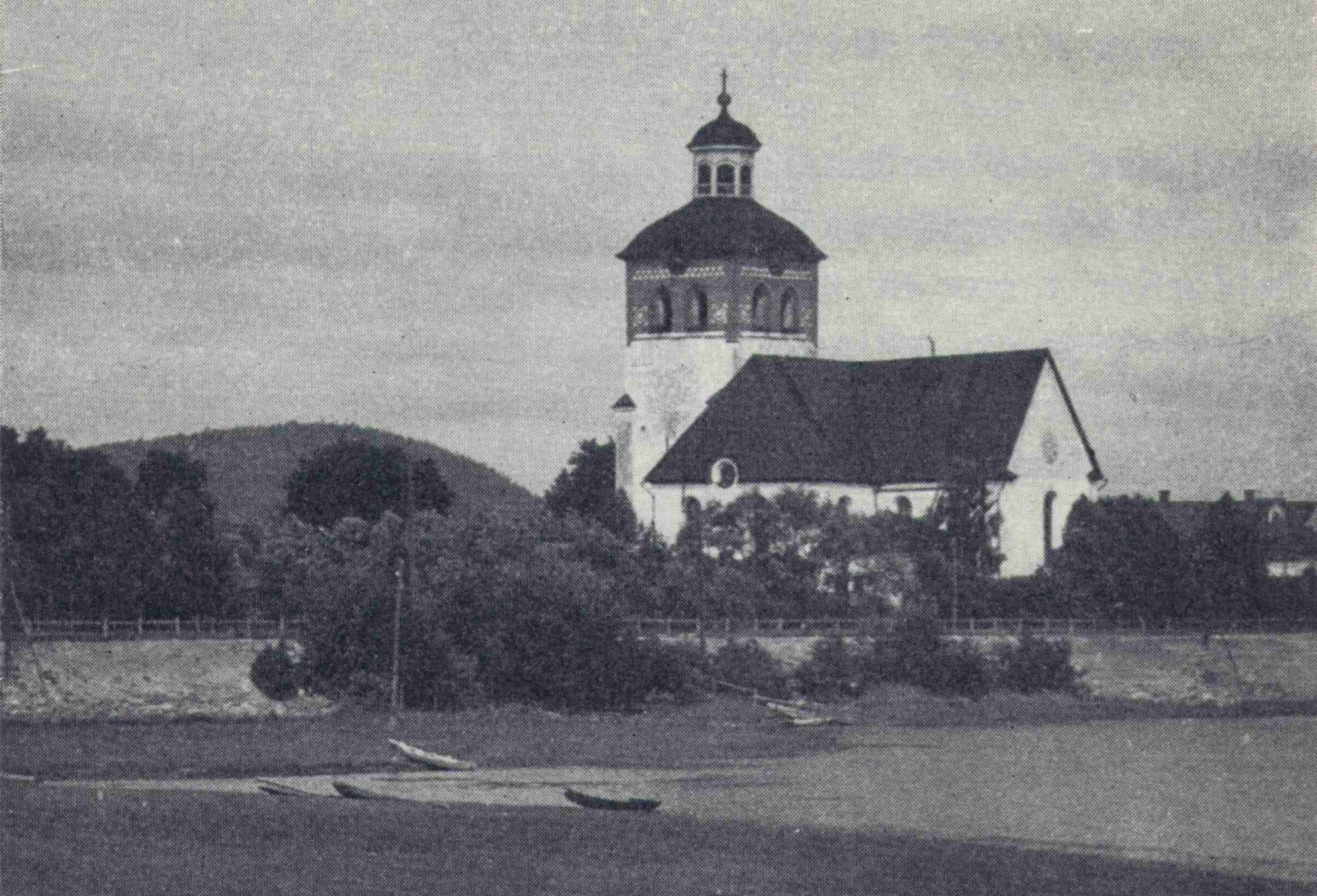
Bollnäs church.

The Bollnäs church was built in the 14th and 15th centuries. An opening ceremony took place on 3 November 1468, probably for the church tower. Later alterations include the addition of the north and south transepts, built 1753-1755. The church hosts a collection of wooden medieval sculptures larger than any other parish church in the Nordic countries. Three of the altarpieces are major works of art from the late 15th century or early 16th century, including an altarpiece dedicated to Virgin Mary made by Haaken Gulleson c. 1520. The church's eucharistic chalice, with its paten, is another valuable piece dating from the same period.

== Notable people ==
- Bengt Åberg (1944–2021), professional motorcycle racer and two-time motocross world champion (1969–1970)
- Bloodbound, Heavy metal band was founded in Bollnäs in 2004.
- Jan Boklöv (b.1966), professional ski jumper lived in Bollnäs during the 1990s.
- Emma Broomé (b.1985), professional actress
- Erik Byléhn (1898–1986), middle-distance runner who competed at the 1924 and 1928 Summer Olympics.
- Emma Engstrand (b.1977), Orienteering competitor.
- Anna Eriksdotter (1624–1704), last person to be executed for witchcraft in Sweden.
- Albin Eriksson (b.2000), professional ice hockey player.
- Anders Eriksson (b.1975), professional ice hockey player.
- Ole Fahlin (1901–1992), Aviator, designer and manufacturer of aviation equipment
- Åke "Stan" Hasselgård (1922–1948), Jazz clarinetist grew up in Bollnäs, where his grave can be found.
- Lina Hedlund (b.1978), professional musician
- C.-H. Hermansson (1917–2016), politician, member of the Swedish Parliament and chairman of the Communist Party of Sweden.
- Tobias Jonsson (b.1996), Paralympic athlete
- Anna-Karin Kammerling (b.1980), Olympic swimmer who competed at the 1980 Summer Olympics.
- Fritz Kiölling (1896–1976), middle-distance runner who competed in the men's 1500 metres at the 1920 Summer Olympics
- Pernilla Lindberg (b.1986), professional golfer.
- Yngve Lundh (1924–2017), cyclist who competed in the individual and team road race events at the 1952 Summer Olympics
- Timo K. Mukka (1944–1973), Finnish author was born in Bollnäs, where his family had been evacuated to during the Lapland War.
- Ulf Norinder (1934–1978), racing driver
- Charles Rytkönen (b. 1968), professional musician
- Thomas von Scheele (b.1969) table tennis player and coach, competed in the 1996 Summer Olympics.
- Victoria Silvstedt (b.1974), professional model, actress, singer, and television personality.
- Johan Söderberg (b.1962), film director and editor
- Peter Stormare (b.1953), professional actor.
- Per-Inge Tällberg (b.1967), professional ski jumper.
- Staffan Tällberg (b.1970), professional ski jumper.
- Göran Unger (1899–1982), athlete who competed in the men's pentathlon at the 1924 Summer Olympics
- Alexander Petersson (b.1997), professional artist.
- Walter Wallberg (b.2000), professional freestyle skier who competed in the 2018 Winter Olympics
