= Gösta "Snoddas" Nordgren =

Swedish bandy player, singer, and actor

Gösta Nordgren
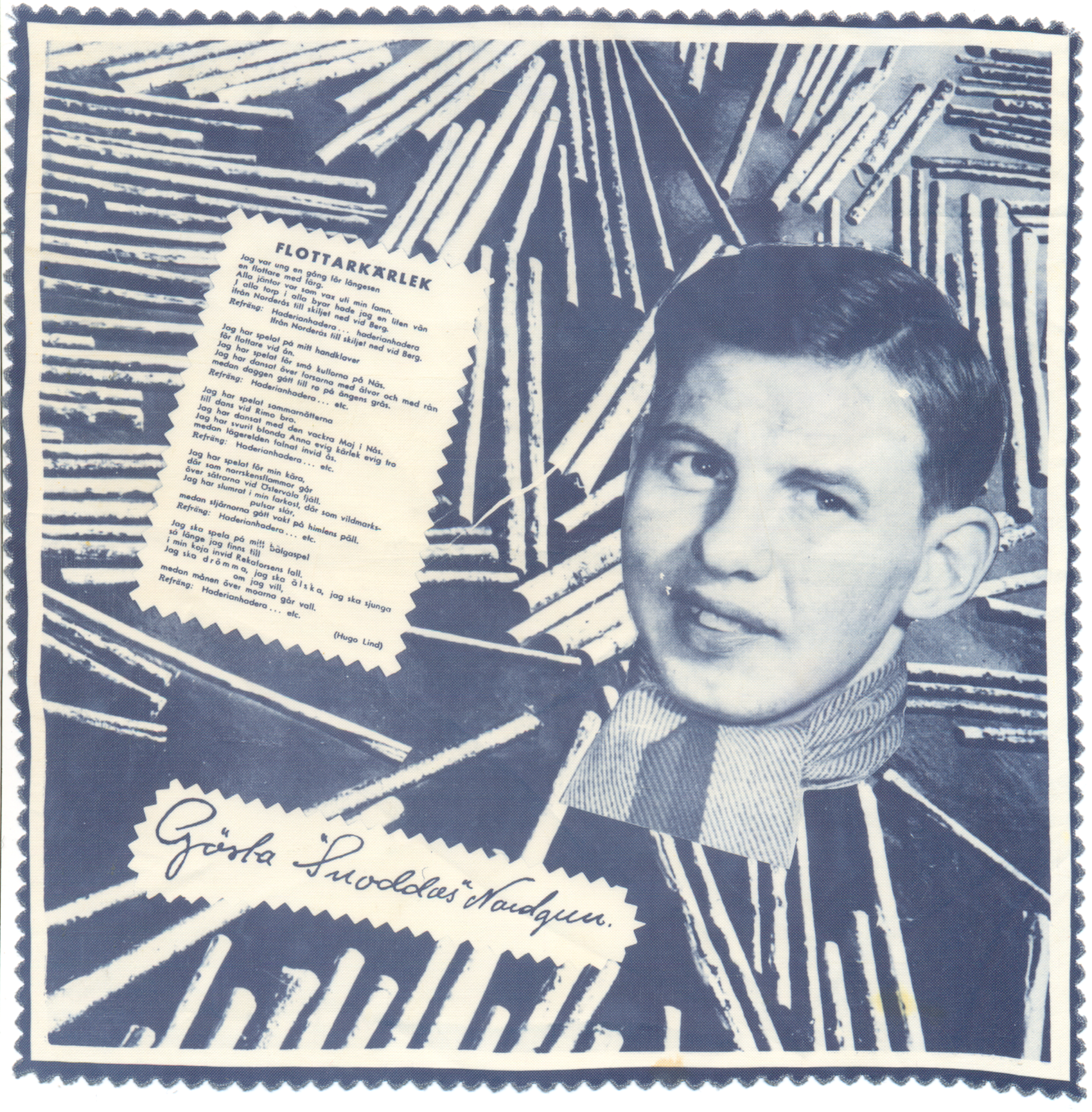
- Silk cloth sold as merchandise at concerts
- Born: 30 December 1926; Arbrå, Sweden
- Died: 18 February 1981 (aged 54); Ljusne, Sweden
- Occupations: Bandy player, singer

Gösta Nordgren (30 December 1926 – 18 February 1981), known as Snoddas, was a Swedish entertainer (singer, actor) and bandy player. Born in Arbrå, Gävleborg County, Snoddas was by profession a timber rafter, which he also sings about in his most famous song "Flottarkärlek" (1952) which became the best selling song up till that time in Sweden with over 300.000 records sold. Snoddas played bandy for Bollnäs GIF. As an actor Snoddas starred in two Åsa-Nisse films in 1952 and 1967.
