= Arbrå =

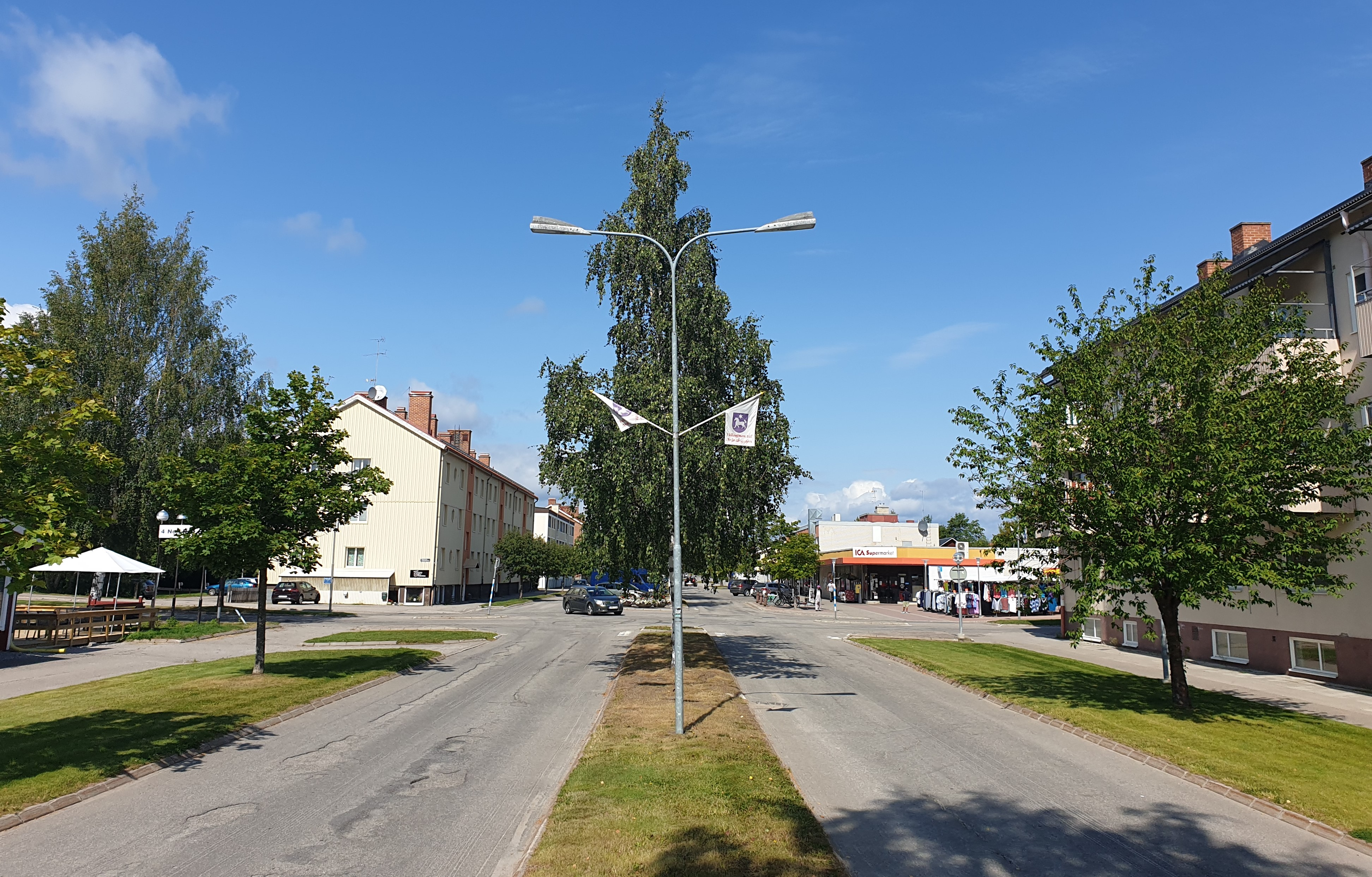
- Arbrå in 2019.

- Location within Sweden Gävleborg Location within Sweden
- Coordinates: 61°28′N 16°23′E
- Country: Sweden
- Province: Hälsingland
- County: Gävleborg County
- Municipality: Bollnäs Municipality

Area
  - Total: 3.94 km^{2} (1.52 sq mi)

Population (31 December 2010)
  - Total: 2,215
  - Density: 562/km^{2} (1,460/sq mi)
- Time zone: UTC+1 (CET)
  - Summer (DST): UTC+2 (CEST)

Arbrå (Swedish pronunciation: [ˈǎrːbrɔ]) is the second largest locality in Bollnäs Municipality, Gävleborg County, Sweden with 2,215 inhabitants in 2010.

== Points of interest ==
- Arbråmasten, a 331 metres tall guyed TV mast.

== Notable people ==
- Gösta "Snoddas" Nordgren, singer and bandy player, was born in Arbrå on 30 December 1926.
- Peter Stormare, actor, grew up in Arbrå.
- Folke Alnevik, athlete & an Olympian

== Sports ==
The following sports clubs are located in Arbrå:

- Arbrå BK
