= Hälsingland =

Historical province of Sweden

Coordinates: 61°30′43″N 16°30′25″E

- Historical province
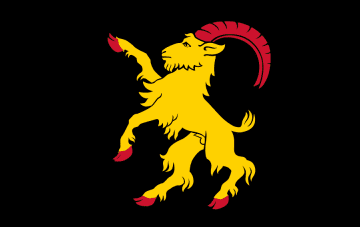
- Flag Coat of arms

- Country: Sweden
- Land: Norrland
- Counties: Gävleborg County; Jämtland County

Area
  - Total: 14,264 km^{2} (5,507 sq mi)

Population (31 December 2023)
  - Total: 129,193
  - Density: 9.0573/km^{2} (23.458/sq mi)

Ethnicity
  - Language: Swedish

Culture
  - Flower: Flax
  - Animal: Lynx
  - Bird: Ural owl
  - Fish: Ide
- Time zone: UTC+1 (CET)
  - Summer (DST): UTC+2 (CEST)

Hälsingland (Swedish pronunciation: [ˈhɛ̌lːsɪŋland]), sometimes referred to by the Latin name Helsingia, is a historical province or landskap in central Sweden. It borders Gästrikland, Dalarna, Härjedalen, Medelpad and the Gulf of Bothnia. It is part of the land of Norrland.

Princess Madeleine is currently the duchess of Hälsingland, along with Gästrikland.

== Administration ==
The traditional provinces of Sweden serve no administrative or political purpose, but are historical and cultural entities. In the case of Hälsingland the province constitutes the northern part of the län ('administrative county') Gävleborg County. Minor parts of the province are in Jämtland County and in Västernorrland County.

The following municipalities have their seats in Hälsingland:

- Bollnäs
- Hudiksvall
- Ljusdal
- Nordanstig
- Ovanåker
- Söderhamn

The six largest settlements are:

- Bollnäs
- Hudiksvall
- Söderhamn
- Ljusdal
- Edsbyn
- Iggesund

== Heraldry ==
The coat of arms were granted in 1560 in the era of King Gustav Vasa. At that time, Hälsingland was known for its large scale goat breeding, and the arms depicted a standing goat facing heraldic right (blazon: Sable, a Goat rampant Or attired and hoofed Gules). This, combined with the arms of Gästrikland, forms the coat of arms for Gävleborg County.

== Geography ==
The terrain is mostly hilly and rocky, sloping down towards the coast. The highest elevation in the northern part is 530 meters, and 671 meters in the western part. Approximately 85% of the land area is covered with forest, and the timber industry has historically been the main source of income. Apart from some areas around the river systems, notably around the River Ljusnan, the soil is barren. Large areas consist of rocks and bogs and are unsuitable for agriculture.

A notable geological feature is the Dellen lake system, created from flooded meteoric impact craters. It is the only occurrence in Sweden of the volcanic Andesite rock, to which it has given the name dellenite.

== History ==
The earliest mention of the people of Hälsingland may be in the Old English poem Widsith, from the 9th or 10th century, where a people called the Hælsings are referred to. The first definite mention of the people is made by Adam of Bremen around 1070, in reference to the leidang shipping fleet.

In the medieval age, the "Helsings" were the Swedish speaking inhabitants of the entire coastal region north of Uppland, a rather imprecise denomination. In the early provincial law of Uppland, the border between northern Uppland and Hälsingland was the Ödmården forest.

According to one theory, the name of the river Helsingå and Helsingfors (later Helsinki), the capital of Finland, was given by settlers from Hälsingland in the 13th century. The problem with this theory is that the Finland Swedish dialects of Uusimaa (Nyland) are related to those of Uppland, not Hälsingland.

The oldest city in Hälsingland is Hudiksvall, chartered in 1582. After that, Söderhamn was chartered in 1620. In 1942 Hälsingland was granted its third city, Bollnäs, which was to become the last city (in Hälsingland) as city status in Sweden was abolished in 1971.

== Elections ==
Hälsingland is part of the Gävleborg constituency for national elections. This list covers the six municipalities that have their seats in Hälsingland, since the municipal reform before the 1973 election. Historically, the area has been dominated by the Social Democrats. This has especially been the case in the heavily industrialized Söderhamn Municipality where the area around Ljusne regularly recorded nearly 90% of the vote left of centre. This meant that the southeast part of the province was the most left-wing in the country until Ljusne got surpassed by Fredriksberg in Ludvika Municipality, Dalarna, in the 1990s. The municipalities of Bollnäs and Hudiksvall leaned left also in the past. That trend strengthened from the 1980s onwards after the decline of the Centre Party nationwide with the Moderate Party never gaining a strong foothold in the province. With the number of residents decreasing while Sweden's population grew simultaneously, the popular vote share of Hälsingland fell from 1.8% in 1976 to just 1.3% in 2018. The list below excludes the small area of the province located in Jämtland County around Ytterhogdal.

=== Riksdag ===
Year	%	Votes	V	S	MP	C	L	KD	M	SD	NyD	Other
1973	89.6	93,853	9.1	45.5		31.2	6.3	1.8	5.7			0.5
1976	90.2	97,764	7.0	46.4		31.8	7.0	1.4	6.0			0.4
1979	89.2	97,152	7.3	48.1		26.5	6.9	1.7	8.9			0.6
1982	90.0	98,734	7.2	50.3	2.0	22.2	4.1	2.1	11.8			0.2
1985	87.8	96,637	6.9	50.4	1.8	19.0	10.4		11.3			0.1
1988	83.6	90,823	7.4	48.8	5.4	18.0	8.6	3.3	8.1			0.4
1991	84.3	91,410	6.1	43.5	3.7	15.3	6.8	7.1	11.3		5.8	0.4
1994	84.3	91,066	8.3	50.9	6.2	12.8	4.8	3.7	11.5		1.0	0.7
1998	78.3	82,026	17.1	39.9	5.6	10.2	3.0	10.4	11.9			2.0
2002	76.6	78,506	11.4	41.0	4.6	15.9	8.8	8.0	8.2	0.7		1.4
2006	77.8	78,449	7.7	40.0	4.0	15.8	4.2	5.7	16.5	2.9		3.1
2010	81.1	81,954	7.0	38.4	5.6	9.9	4.4	4.6	21.4	7.1		1.5
2014	84.3	84,494	6.0	39.1	4.7	8.9	2.9	3.5	15.9	16.1		3.0
2018	85.3	84,442	8.0	34.6	2.7	12.1	3.0	5.9	13.8	18.6		1.3

== Culture ==
=== Dialect ===
The local dialect is known as Hälsingemål or Hälsingska but has no official linguistic recognition.

=== Folk architecture ===
The Decorated Farmhouses of Hälsingland—"Hälsingegårdar"—are a UNESCO World Heritage Site. Two or even three stories high, the farmhouses are built to show wealth and independence, and much inventiveness has gone into decorating their interiors, which combine aristocratic fashions with traditional materials and techniques.

== Sports ==
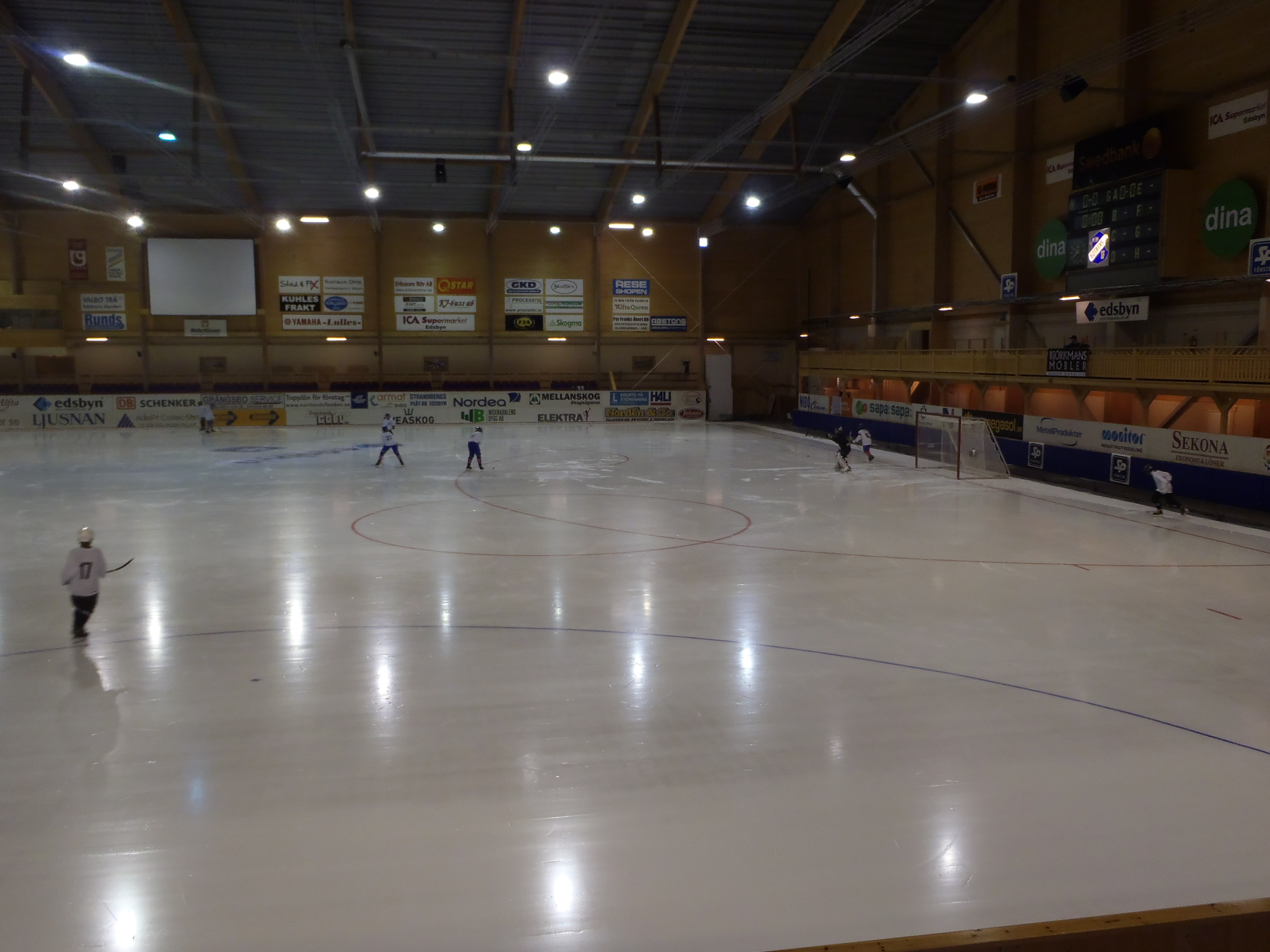
Svenska Fönster Arena in Edsbyn was the first Swedish indoor bandy venue

Bandy is very popular in Hälsingland; it is the only district where bandy is bigger than ice hockey.

During the season 2024/2025 Hälsingland had 4 clubs in the highest tier of Swedish Bandy, Elitserien.

- Bollnäs GiF
- Broberg / Söderhamn Bandy IF
- Edsbyns IF
- Ljusdals BK

Football in the province is administered by Hälsinglands Fotbollförbund.

Hockey teams in Hälsingland include:

- Järvsö IK- HockeyTrean
- Gällsta IK- HockeyTrean
- Bollnäs IS- HockeyTrean
- Soderhamn/Ljunse HC- HockeyTvåan
- Hudiksvalls HC- Hockeyettan

== Notable natives ==
- Tomas Brolin, former football player, who played in the World Cup All Star Team 1994, was born in Finflo outside the town of Hudiksvall.
- Hans Johansson, former bandy player, several times Swedish and world champion, is originally from Edsbyn.
- Photographer and author Hilding Mickelsson, who spent his life documenting and preserving Hälsingland's cultural, intangible and natural heritage.
- Actress Noomi Rapace, famous through the adaptions of the Millennium series, was born in Norrbo, Hudiksvall.
- Marie Richardson, an actress appearing in over a hundred productions on the stage, television and film, was born in the town of Ljusdal.
- Archbishop Nathan Söderblom, Nobel Peace Prize laureate in 1930, was born in Trönö, Hälsingland in 1866.

== Subdivisions ==
Hälsingland was historically divided into districts:

- Arbrå Court District
- Bergsjö Court District
- Delsbo Court District
- Enånger Court District
- Forsa Court District
- Hälsingland South-Eastern Court District
- Hälsingland South-Western Court District
- Järvsö Court District
- Ljusdal Court District

== In popular culture ==
- Midsommar, a 2019 film set in Hälsingland
