= Cant hook =

Logging tool

A modern cant hook.

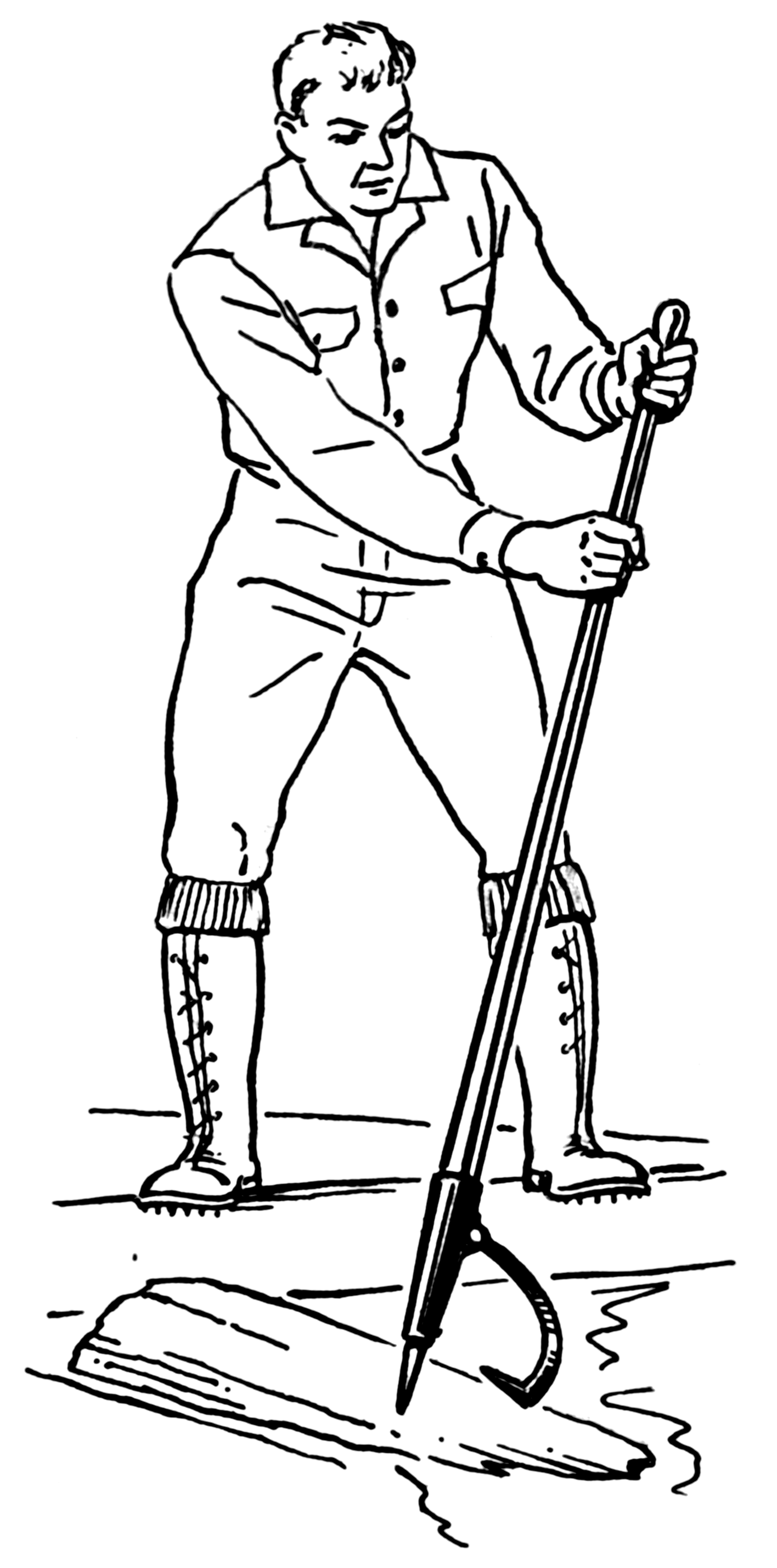
A log driver using a peavey

A cant hook, pike, or hooked pike is a traditional logging tool consisting of a wooden lever handle with a movable metal hook called a dog at one end, used for handling and turning logs and cants, especially in sawmills. A cant hook has a blunt end, or possibly small teeth for friction.

A peavey or peavey hook is similar but has a spike in the working end. Many lumberjacks use the terms interchangeably. A peavey is generally from 30 to 60 inches (0.76 to 1.52 metres) long. The spike is rammed into a log, then a hook (at the end of an arm attached to a pivot a short distance up the handle) grabs the log at a second place. Once engaged, the handle gives the operator leverage to roll, slide or float the log to a new place. The peavey was named for blacksmith Joseph Peavey of Maine who invented the tool as a refinement to the cant hook in the late 1850s. The Peavey Manufacturing Co. is still located in Eddington, Maine, and manufactures several variations. From early times to about 1910, the peavey was written about with various spellings such as "pevy" and "pivie".

== Description ==
A logging tool description from the Lumberman's Museum at Patten, Maine, reads in part: "A cant dog or cant hook was used for lifting, turning, and prying logs when loading sleds and on the drive. At first, a swivel hook on a pole with nothing to hold it in position was used. This was called a swing dingle." However, the term swing dingle is more often published as being a type of logging sled. These early types are also called a ring dog or ring dog cant hook. In 1858, Joseph Peavey, a blacksmith in Stillwater, Maine, made a rigid clasp to encircle the cant dog handle with the hook on one side. It moved up and down, but not sideways. Loggers have used it ever since.

While this tool has its origins in the logging industry, many arborists, tree care professionals, landowners and portable sawmill operators now use cant hooks for moving logs and timber.

== Gallery ==
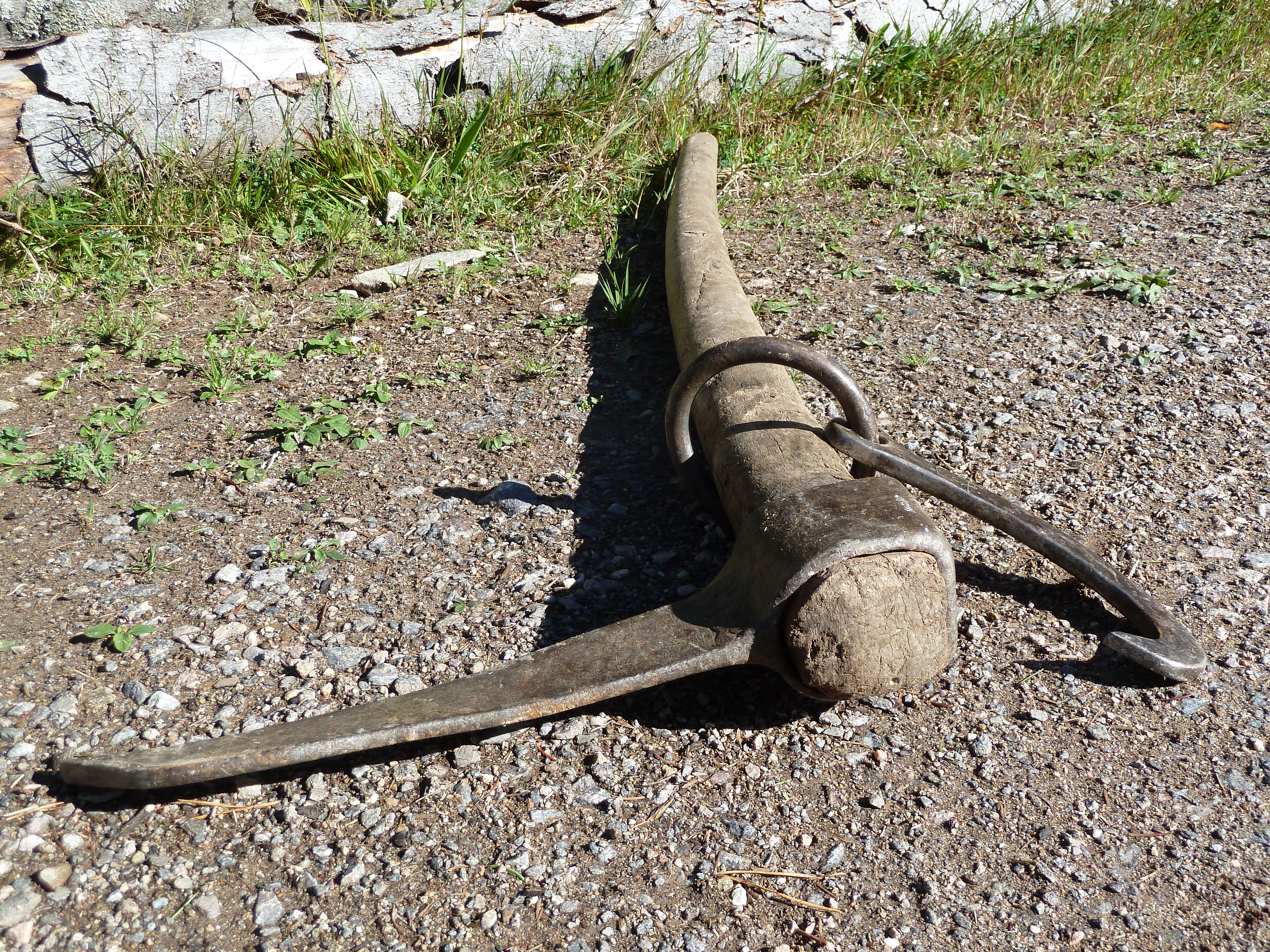
A German type of ring dog cant hook

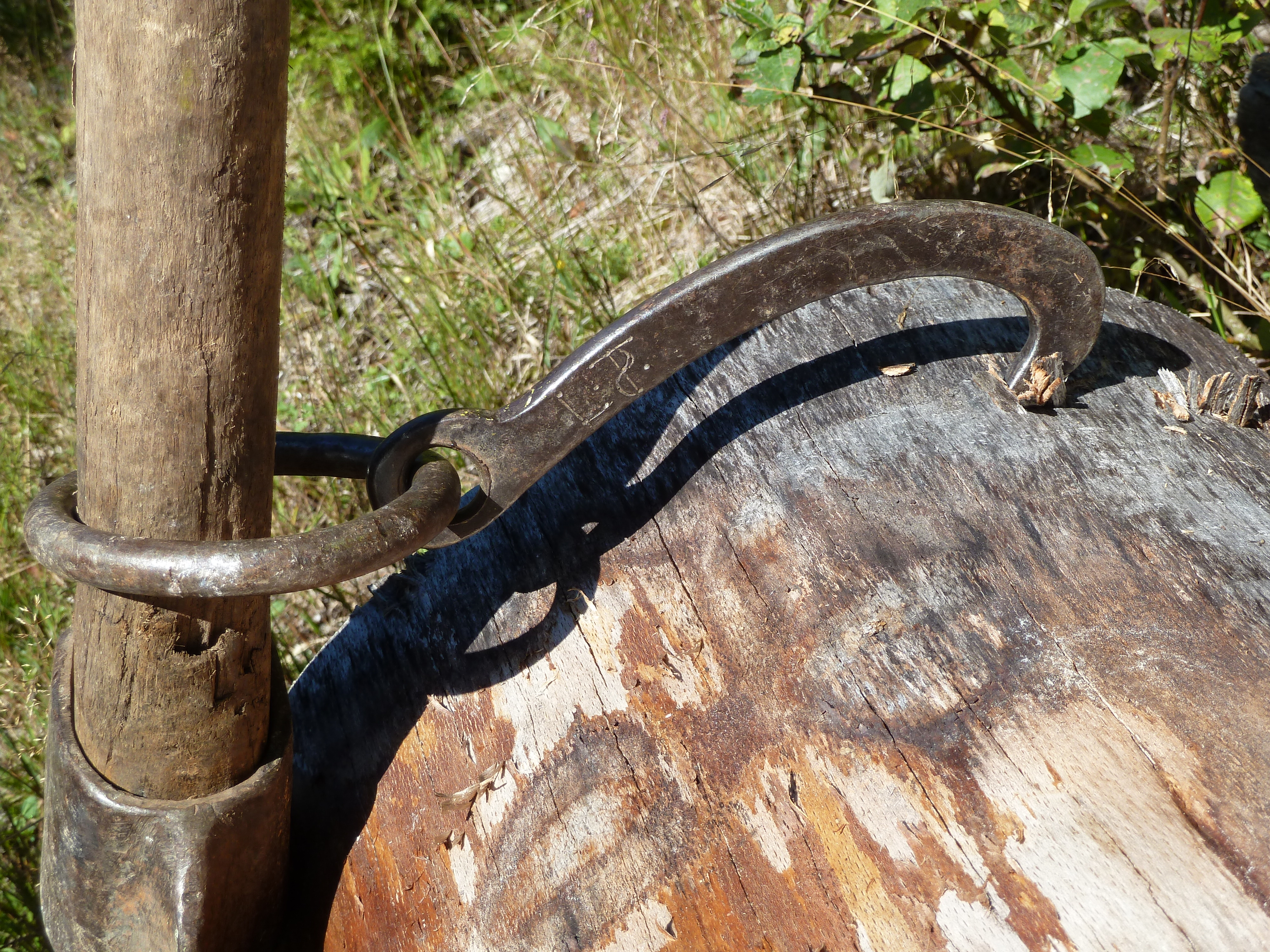
German type in use

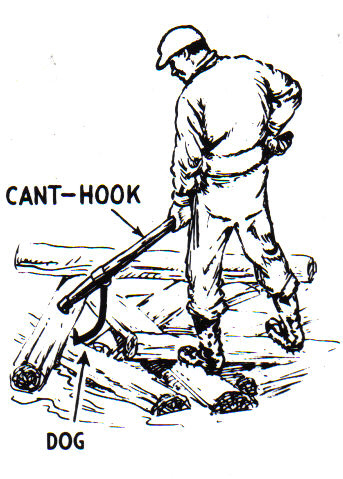

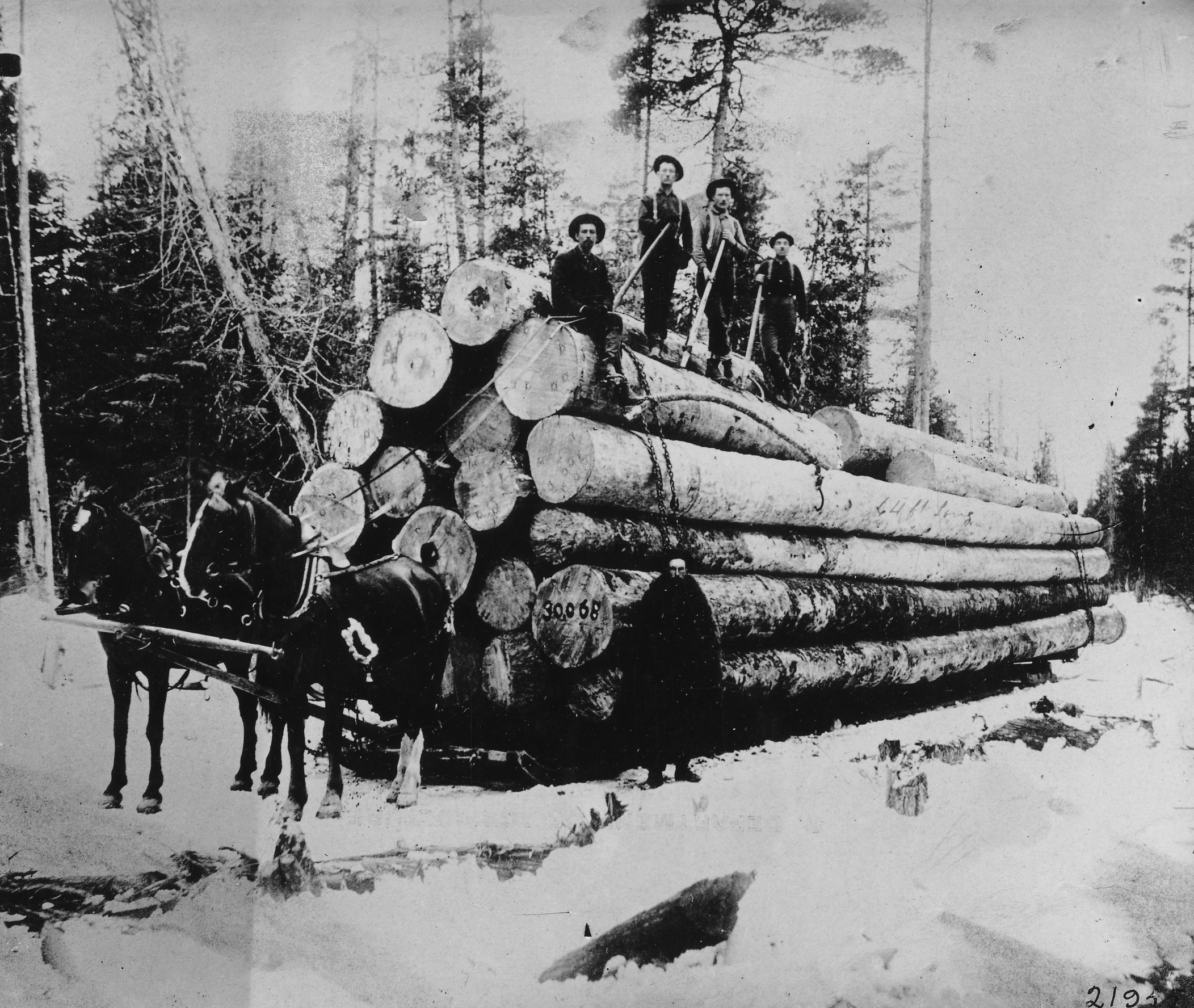
Logs loaded with cant hooks which three of the men are holding.

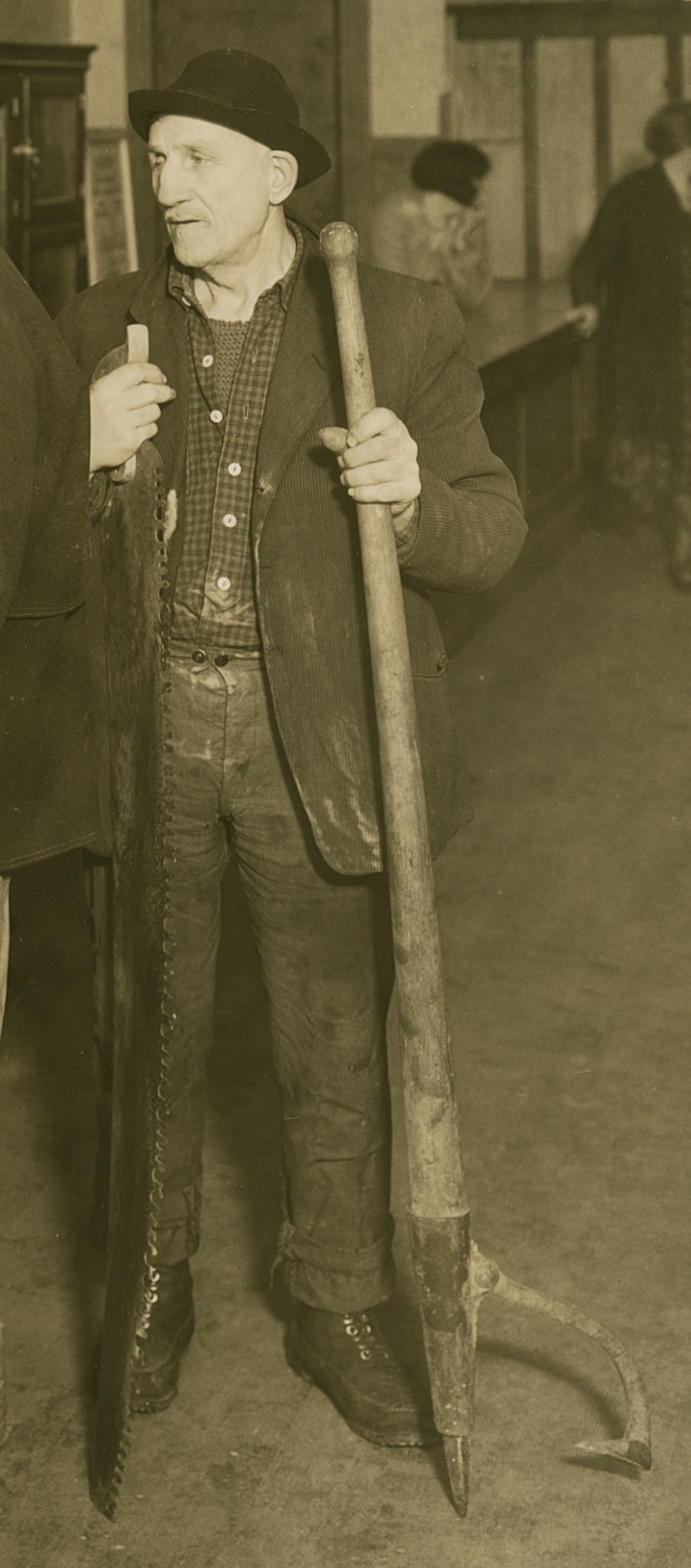
Man holding a crosscut saw and a peavey.

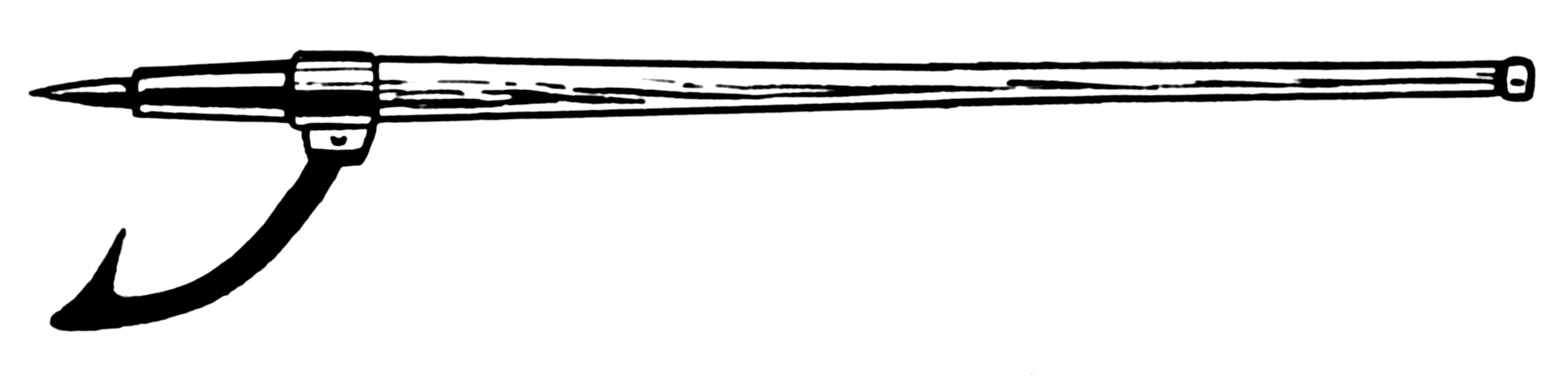
A peavey is a cant hook with a point.

== See also ==
- Boat hook
- Drawknife
- Forestry hook
- Pickaroon
- Pike pole
- Sappie (in German)
- Tongs
