= Marshall 22 =

US recreational keelboat

Marshall 22 Cat
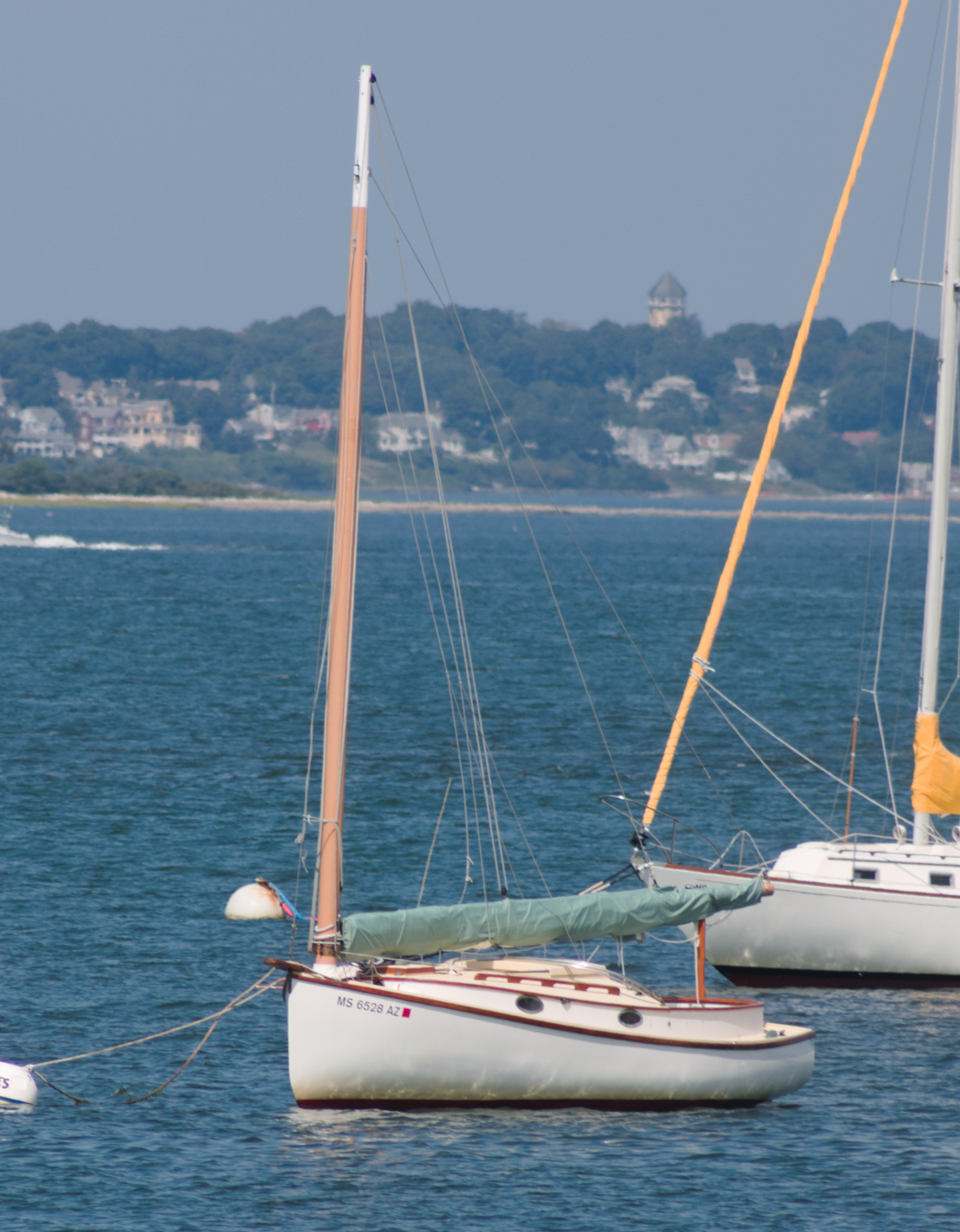

Development
- Designer: Breckenridge Marshall
- Location: United States
- Year: 1965
- No. built: almost 800
- Builder: Marshall Marine Corporation
- Name: Marshall 22 Cat

Boat
- Displacement: 5,660 lb (2,567 kg)
- Draft: 5.18 ft (1.58 m) centerboard down

Hull
- Type: Monohull
- Construction: Fiberglass
- LOA: 22.18 ft (6.76 m)
- LWL: 21.33 ft (6.50 m)
- Beam: 10.18 ft (3.10 m)
- Engine: Yanmar 21 hp (16 kW) diesel engine

Hull appendages
- Keel: centerboard
- Ballast: 850 lb (386 kg)
- Rudder: transom-mounted rudder

Rig
- Rig type: Cat rig

Sails
- Sailplan: Gaff rig catboat
- Mainsail area: 368.00 sq ft (34.188 m^{2})

Racing
- PHRF: 279 (average)

The Marshall 22 is a recreational keelboat built by Marshall Marine Corporation in South Dartmouth, Massachusetts, United States. Production started in 1965 and the design remains in production. Nearly 800 have been built.

== Design ==
The Marshall 22 is built predominantly of fiberglass, with wood trim. It has a catboat gaff rig or optionally a fractional sloop rig, a plumb stem, a vertical transom, a transom-hung rudder controlled by a wheel and a fixed keel with a centerboard. It displaces 5,660 lb (2,567 kg) and carries 850 lb (386 kg) of ballast.

The boat has a draft of 5.18 ft (1.58 m) with the centerboard extended and 2.00 ft (0.61 m) with it retracted, allowing beaching or ground transportation on a trailer.

Later examples of the boat, between 1980 and 1985 are fitted with a Japanese Yanmar 3GM diesel engine of 21 hp (16 kW).

The catboat version has simple rigging with only a forestay on the mast and the mainsheet for controlling the sail. Factory standard equipment includes a boat hook, fog horn, fire extinguisher and life jackets.

Accommodation includes a settee on the port side of the bow and a starboard settee slightly aft. The galley is in the main cabin on the port side, while the head is on the forward starboard side. The main cabin has a drop-leaf table that is mounted on the centerboard trunk. The bow cabin has two ports and the main cabin has four. Cabin headroom is 62 in (157 cm).

The cat-rigged version of the design has a PHRF racing average handicap of 279 with a high of 246 and low of 350. It has a hull speed of 6.19 kn (11.46 km/h).

== Reception ==
In a review in Sailing Magazine, David Liscio, wrote, "these boats seem to exude a simple elegance".

In a 2010 review Steve Henkel wrote, "The Marshall 22 catboat and her sloop-rigged sister have been in production for over 40 years—one of the longest running continuously produced cruising sailboat designs ever. During the period, understandably, the builder has made many changes. Gasoline engines have been replaced with diesels, horsepower ratings have crept up, interior layout has been modified ... and fit and finish have gone through several iterations (generally toward fancier wood trim). Still, the Marshall 22 remains essentially the same boat it was in 1965, featuring shallow draft (two feet with board up) for gunkholing or lying on the bottom at low tide, and a good length on deck for a catboat. (Hoisting the sail on a bigger cat can be a pain for a singlehander—and a smaller cat has a lot less space below.) Best features: she looks like the pretty Cape Cod cat she is; skippers are likely to get frequent compliments while cruising. There's a good network of other catboaters, especially in the northeastern states for those seeking nautical camaraderie. Worst features: Compared to her comps, headroom is low. Also: the Marshall 22 cat has a reputation for being a bit sluggish in light air; well-sailed Marshall 18s can beat her handily. The sloop rig (338 sq. ft. main, 100 sq. ft. jib) is even slower Both rigs are better when it breezes up."

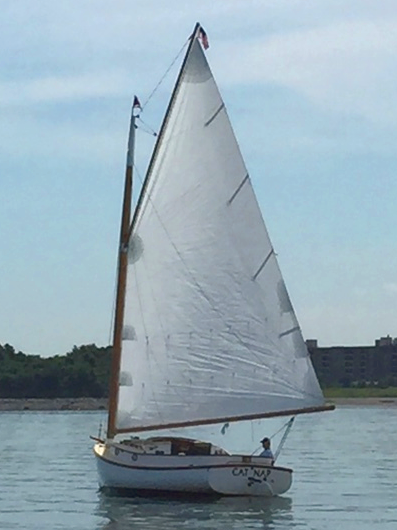
Marshall 22
