= Timber floating =

Timber floating may refer to:

- Log driving
- Timber rafting
