= Cargo hook =

Cargo hook may refer to:

- Hook (hand tool), also known as a longshoreman's hook, box hook, loading hook, docker's hook, baling hook, bale hook, hay hook etc.
- Cargo hook (helicopter), different types of hook systems for helicopters
