= Hook (hand tool) =

Hand tool for securing and moving loads

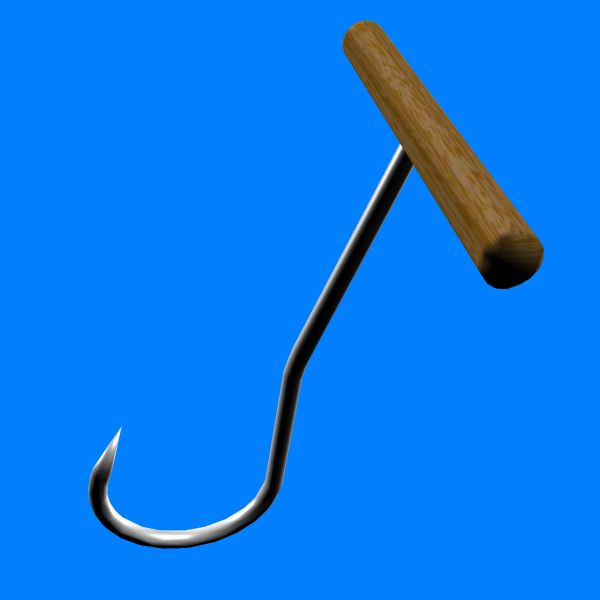
- Other names: Bale hook Baling hook Box hook Cargo hook Docker's hook Forestry hook Hay hook Loading hook Longshoreman's hook
- Related: Fishing gaff

A hook is a hand tool used for securing and moving loads. It consists of a round wooden handle with a strong metal hook about 20 cm (8 inches) long projecting at a right angle from the center of the handle. The appliance is held in a closed fist with the hook projecting between two fingers.

This type of hook is used in many different industries, and has many different names. It may be called a box hook, cargo hook, loading hook, docker's hook when used by longshoremen, and a baling hook, bale hook, or hay hook in the agricultural industry. Other variants exist, such as in forestry, for moving logs, and a type with a long shaft, used by city workers to remove manhole covers.

Smaller hooks may also be used in food processing and transport.

== Dockwork ==
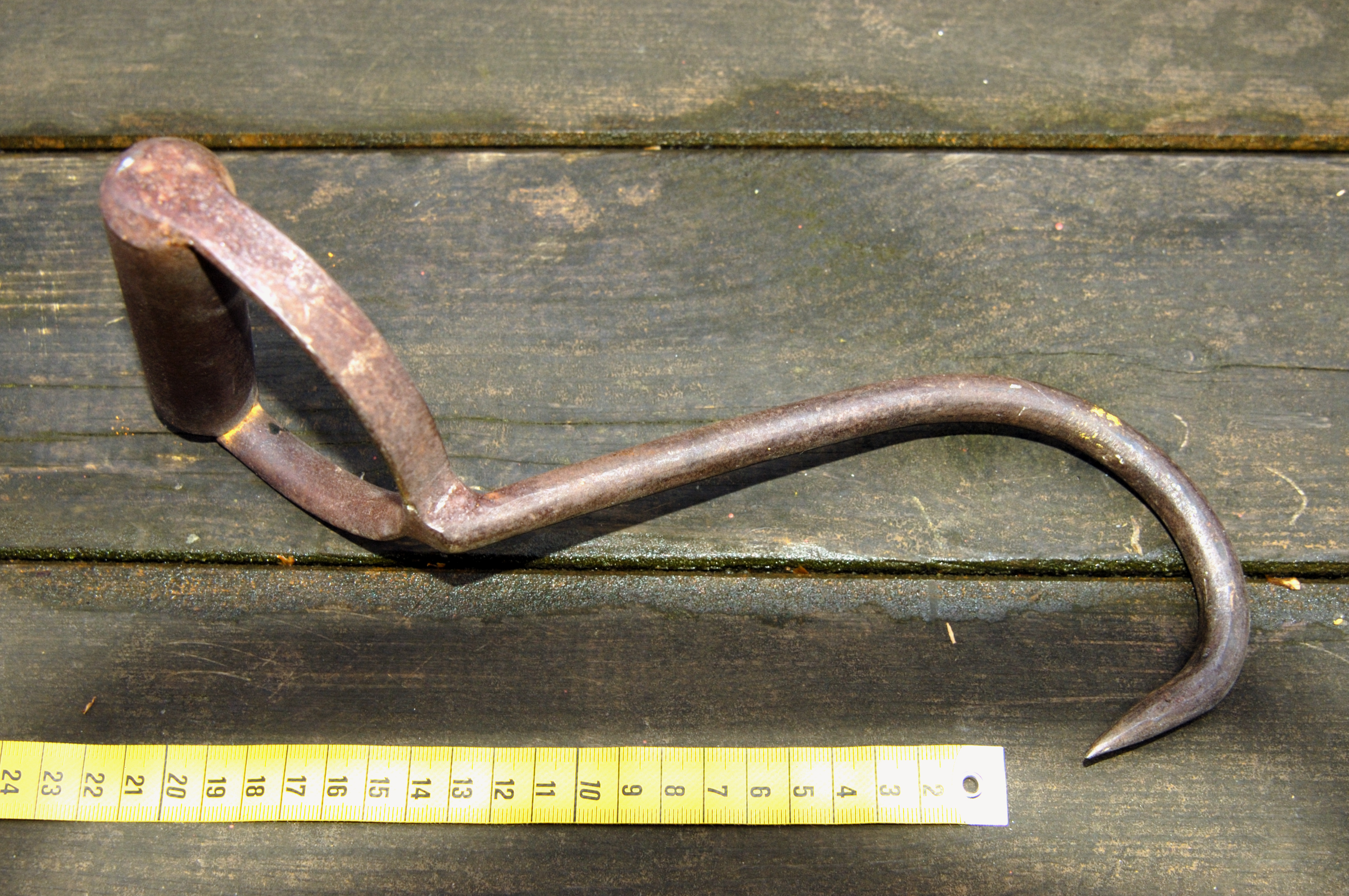
Longshoreman's hook

The longshoreman's hook was historically used by longshoremen (stevedores). Before the age of containerization, freight was moved on and off ships with extensive manual labor, and the longshoreman's hook was the basic tool of the dockworker. The hook became an emblem of the longshoreman's profession in the same way that a hammer and anvil are associated with blacksmiths, or the pipe wrench with pipefitters, sprinklerfitters and plumbers. When longshoremen went on strike or retired, it was known as "hanging up the hook" or "slinging the hook", and the newsletter for retired members of the International Longshore and Warehouse Union's Seattle Local is called The Rusty Hook. A longshoreman's hook was often carried by hooking it through the belt.

Longshoremen carried various types of hooks depending on the cargo they would handle. Cargo could come in the form of bales, sacks, barrels, wood crates, or it could be stowed individually in the cargo hold of the ship. The primary function of the hook was to protect the hands of the longshoreman from being injured while handling the cargo. Hooks also improved the reach of the worker and allowed greater strength and handling of the cargo.

Some cargo items are liable to be damaged if pulled at with a longshoreman's hook: hence the "Use No Hooks" warning sign.

A longshoreman's hook looks somewhat intimidating, and as it was also associated with strong, tough dockworkers, it became a commonly used weapon in crime fiction, similar to the ice pick. For example, in an episode of Alfred Hitchcock Presents entitled Shopping for Death, a character is murdered (off-screen) using a longshoreman's hook. It was sometimes used as a weapon and means of intimidation in real life as well; the book Joey the Hit Man: The Autobiography of a Mafia Killer states "One guy who used to work on the docks was called Charlie the Hook. If he didn't like you he would pick you up with his hook." In the 1957 New York drama film Edge of the City, two longshoremen settle their dispute in a deadly baling hook fight. They are also the primary weapon of Spider Splicers in the BioShock series, so named due to their use of the hooks to crawl on ceilings and attack unexpectedly.

== Haying ==
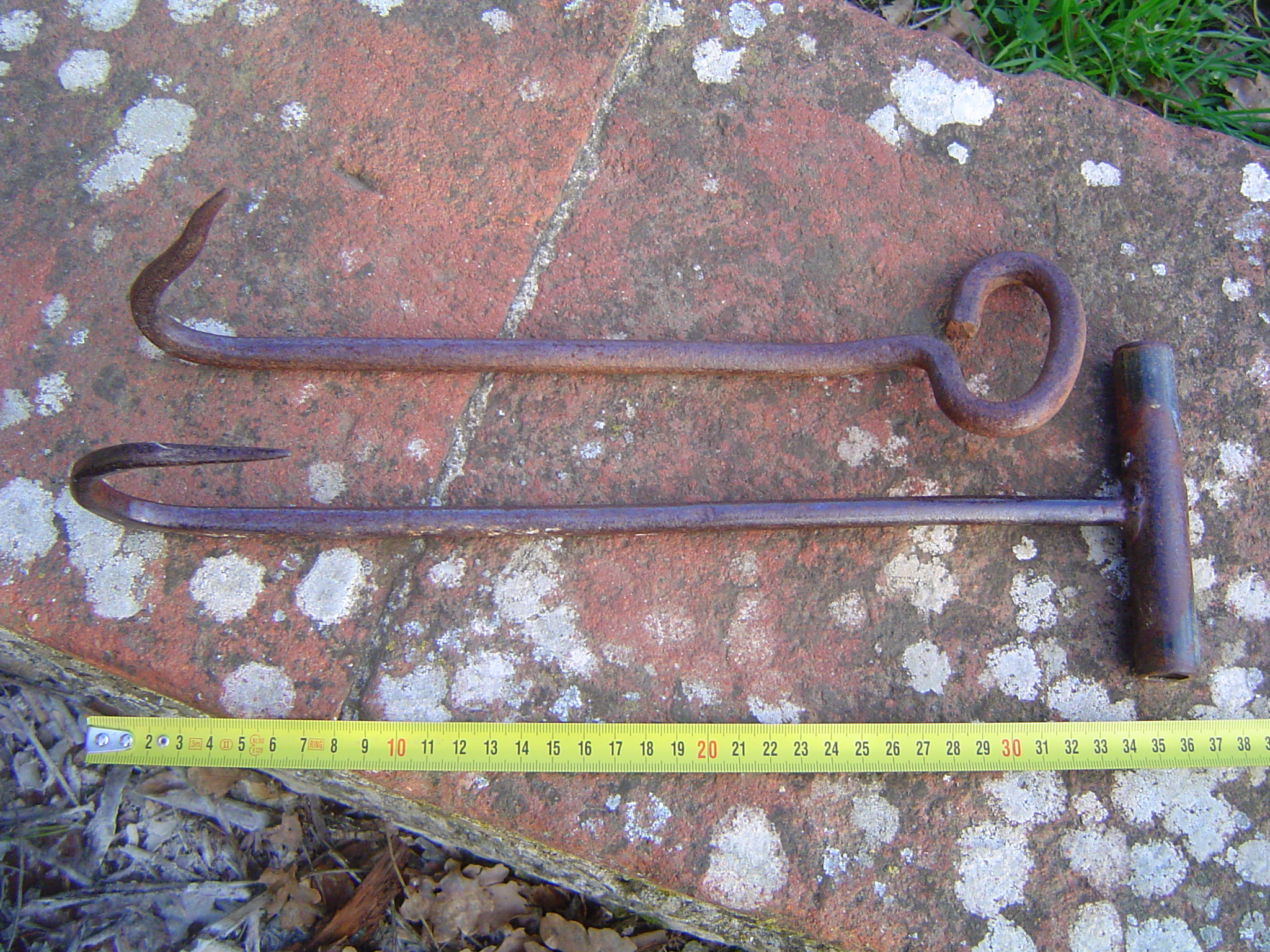
Two hay hooks with scale

A hay hook is slightly different in design from a longshoreman's hook, in that the shaft is typically longer. It is used in hay bucking on farms to secure and move bales of hay, which are otherwise awkward to pick up manually.

== Gardening ==
In gardening and agriculture, a variant with a long shaft is used to move large plants. A hook is placed in either side of the baled roots, allowing workers to carry or place the heavy load.

== Forestry ==
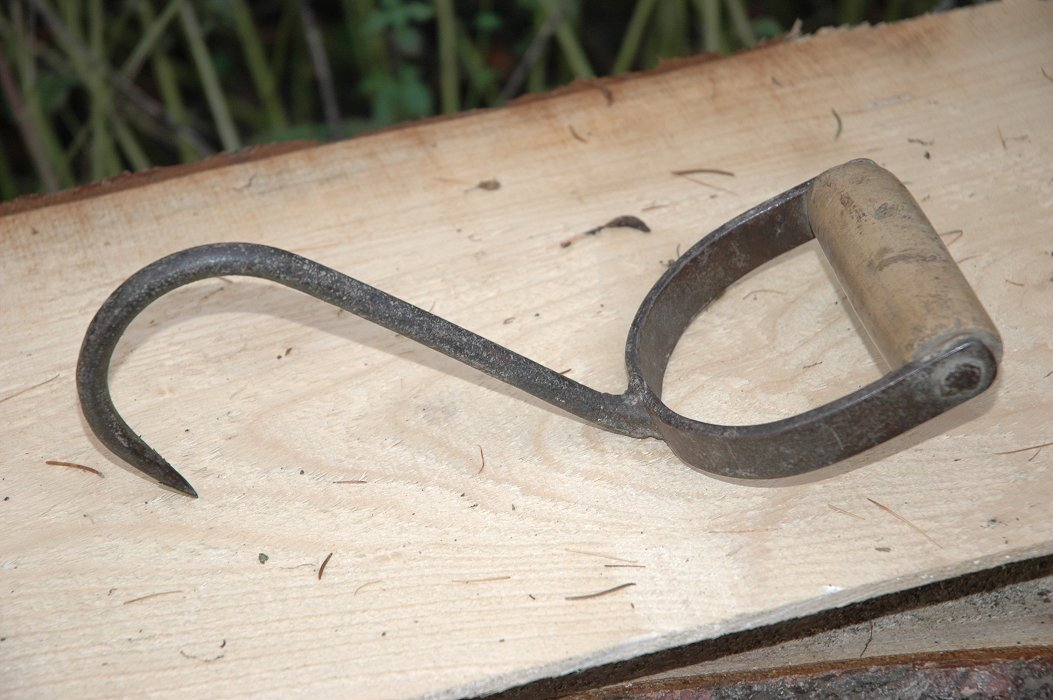
A "Packhaken", used for moving firewood

Called a "Packhaken", "Hebehaken", or "Forsthaken" in German, this type is used in forestry mainly to lift or move firewood. In Sweden, this tool, though slightly different, is called a "timmerkrok", which translates as "timberhook". It is used mainly by two people to move logs by hooking them in each end.

== See also ==
- Cant hook
- Fishing gaff
- Pickaroon
- Prosthetic hook
