= Log boom =

Barrier across a river to contain floating logs

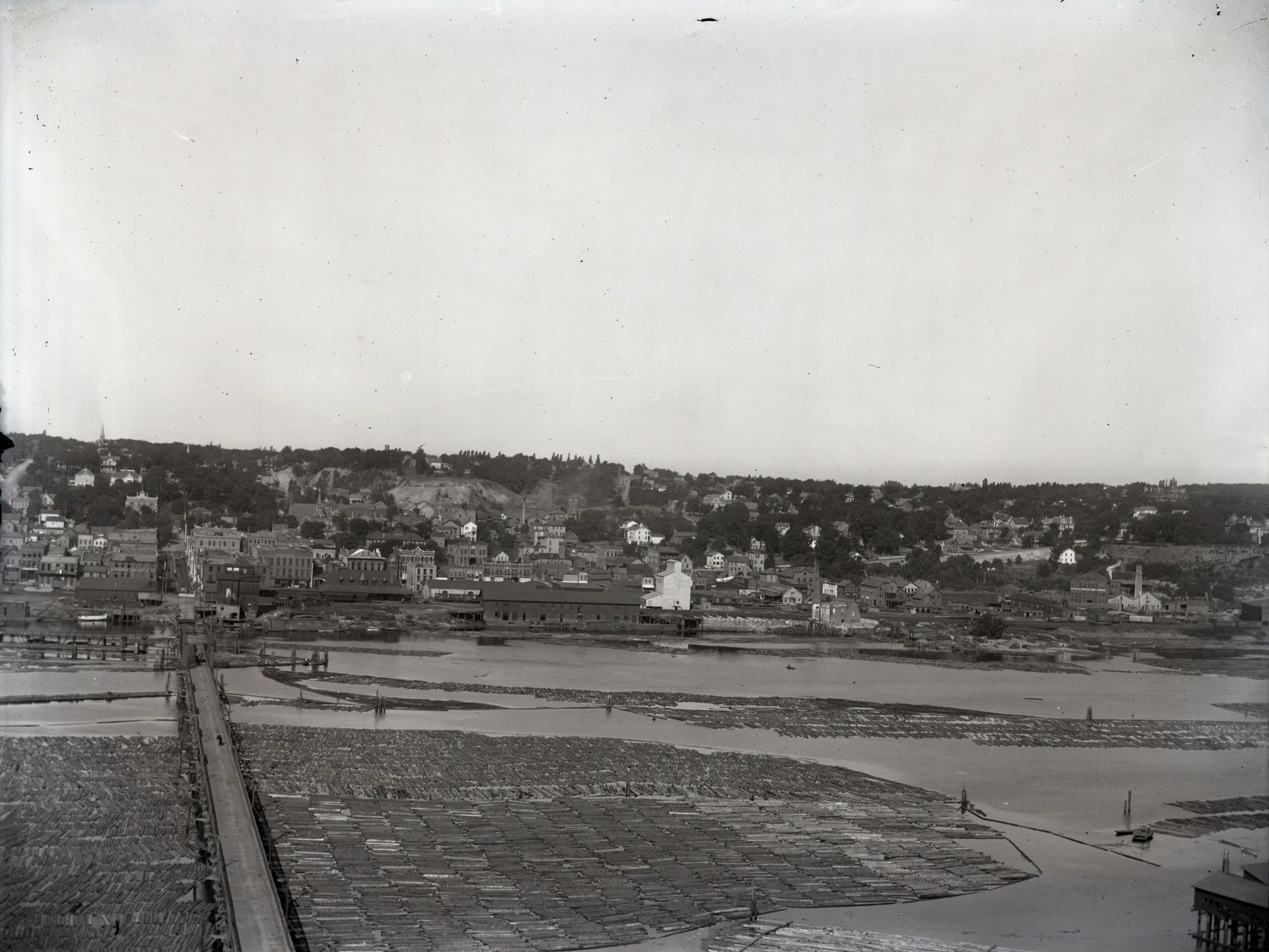
Log boom moving south on the St. Croix River in Stillwater, Minnesota, 1895.

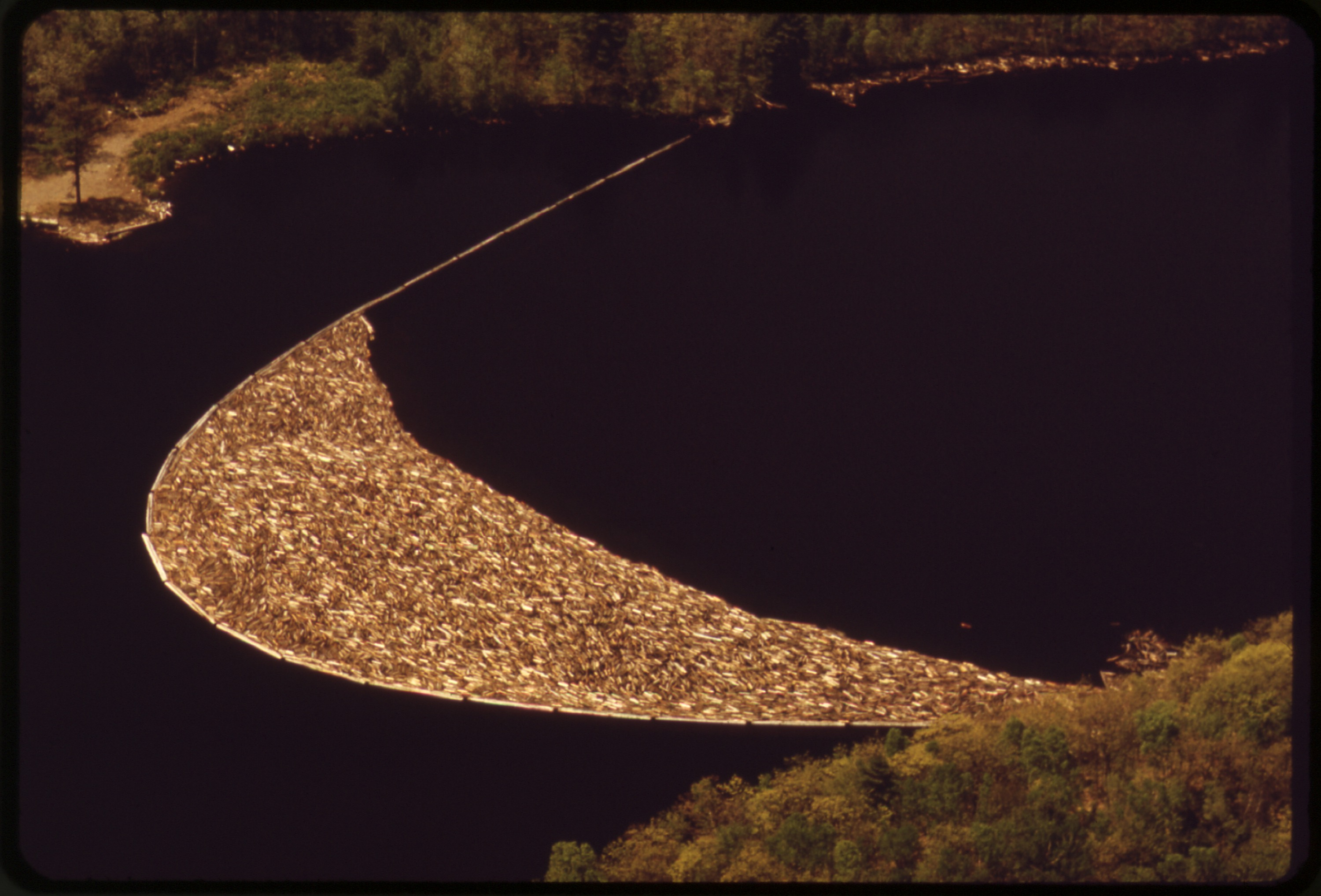
Log boom on St. Croix River in Maine, aerial photo taken in 1973

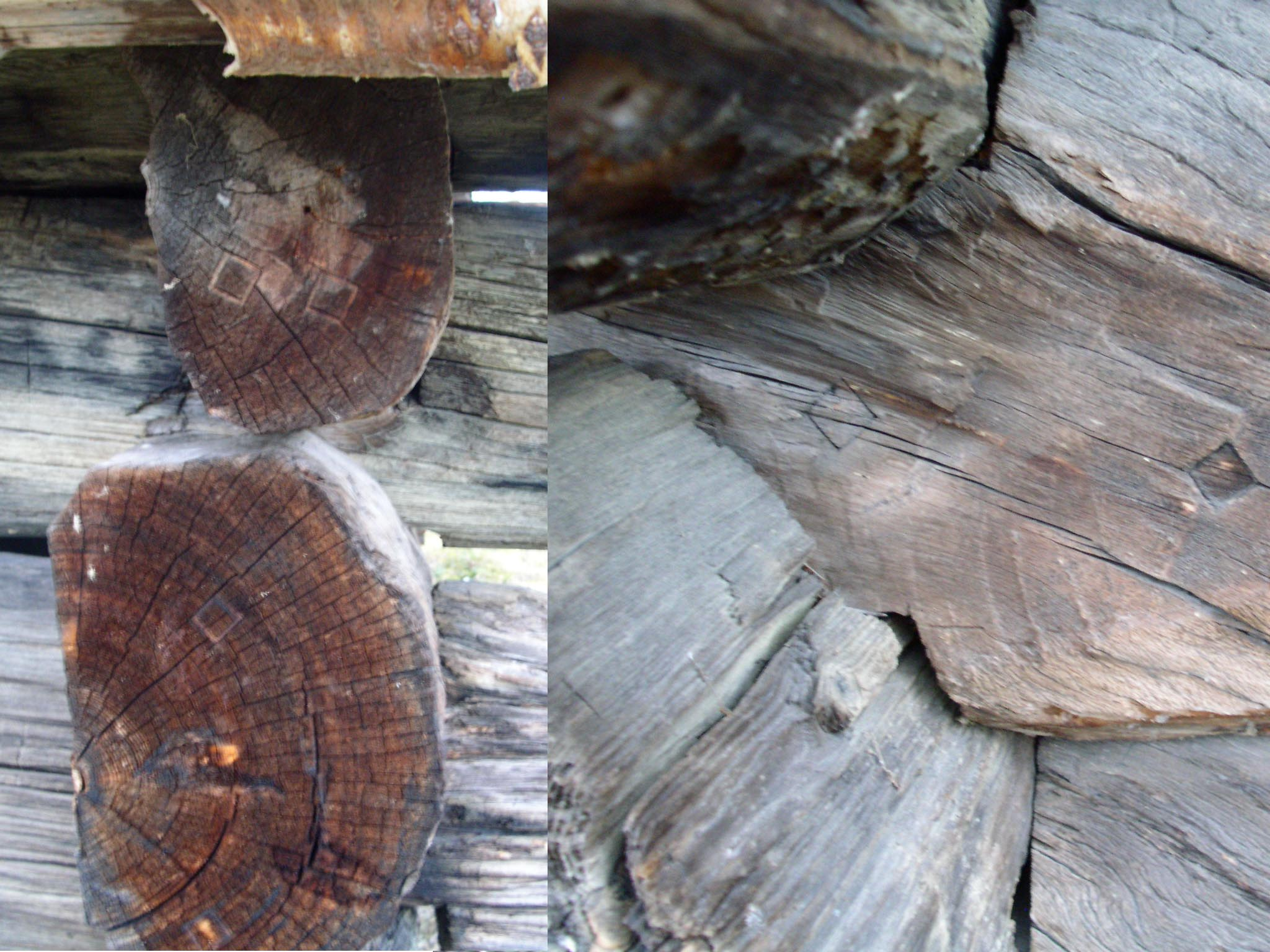
Timber marks on a log building in Sweden where they are called flottningsmärke

A log boom (sometimes called a log fence or log bag) is a barrier placed in a river, designed to collect and or contain floating logs timbered from nearby forests. The term is also used as a place where logs were collected into booms, as at the mouth of a river. With several firms driving on the same stream, it was necessary to direct the logs to their owner's respective booms, with each log identified by its own patented timber mark. One of the most well known log booms was in Williamsport, Pennsylvania, along the Susquehanna River. The development and completion of that specific log boom in 1851 made Williamsport the "Lumber Capital of the World".

As the logs proceeded downstream, they encountered these booms in a manner that allowed log drivers to control their progress, eventually guiding them to the river mouth or sawmills. Most importantly, the booms could be towed across lakes, like rafts, or anchored while individual logs awaited their turn to go through the mill. Booms prevented the escape into open waters of these valuable assets.

Log boom foundations were commonly constructed of piles of large stones placed into cribs in a river to form small islands. The booms were themselves large floating logs linked together end to end, like a large floating chain connecting the foundations while strategically guiding the transported logs along their path.

Large blocks of ice commonly threaten booms, pushing free-flowing logs over the structures. Significantly large chunks of ice can even gain enough power so as to break through the boom altogether, freeing the logs and endangering unsuspecting people and wildlife located downstream. Moreover, flooding and the changing of the seasons fluctuate water levels, occasionally causing jams that can extend for miles on end.

Log booms were used in the United States and British North America throughout the 19th and early 20th centuries. During the largely bloodless Aroostook War that centred on the disputed border between Maine and New Brunswick, hastily built booms proved pricy for local governments. The 1,300-foot-long Aroostook Boom, made of confiscated timber and containing seven piers, cost the state of Maine more than $15,000 to construct. Licensed loggers commonly sent their wood in easily manageable raft units, but illegal lumbermen cunningly sent loose timber, complicating the sorting process and angering officials. Booms often caused friction between the disputing governments; when political tensions intensified, loggers and soldiers targeted enemy booms with arms and explosives.

== See also ==
- Boom (navigational barrier)
- Timber rafting
