= Hay buck =

Stacking of hay for storage or transport

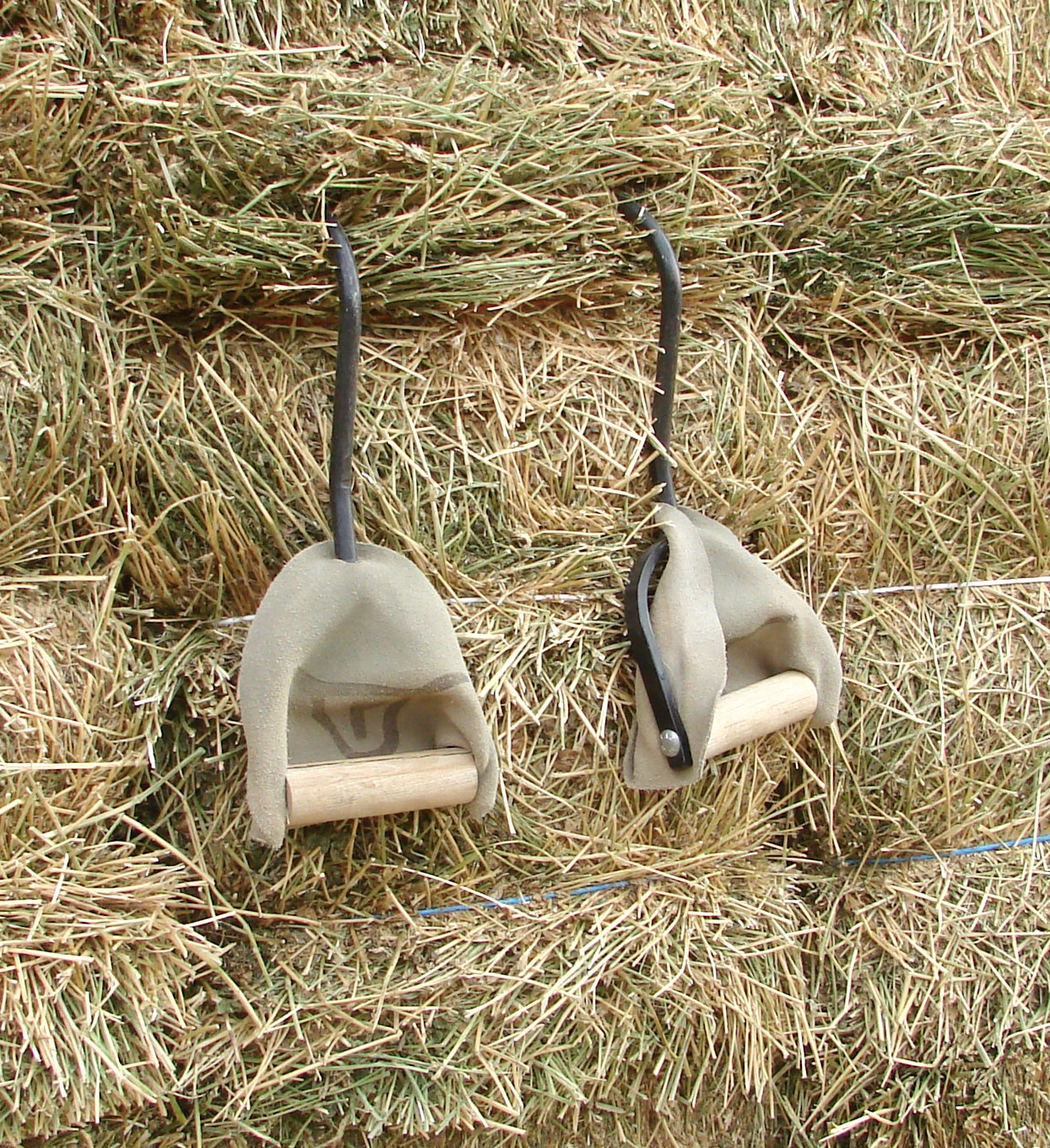
Hay hooks stuck into a haystack

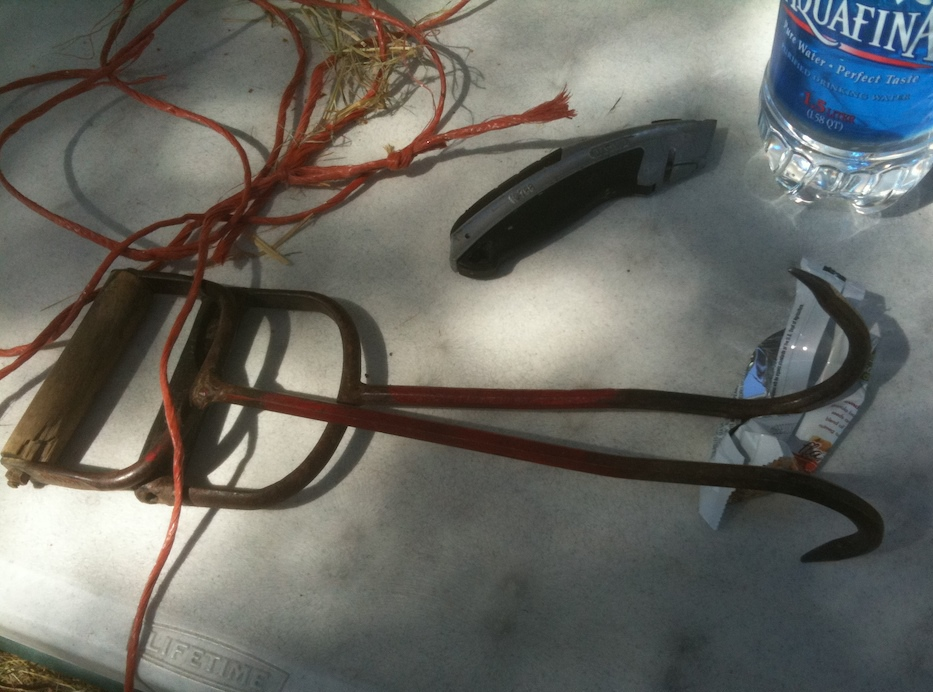
Two hay hooks and some baling twine

Hay bucking, or "bucking hay", is a type of manual labor where small square bales, ranging in weight from about 50 to 150 pounds (23 to 68 kg), are stacked by hand in a field, in a storage area such as a barn, or stacked on a vehicle for transportation, such as a flatbed trailer or semi truck for delivery to where the hay is needed. The act of throwing the bales up to a higher level is called "bucking". The work is very strenuous and physically demanding, and it requires using proper techniques in order not to become fatigued and avoid injury.

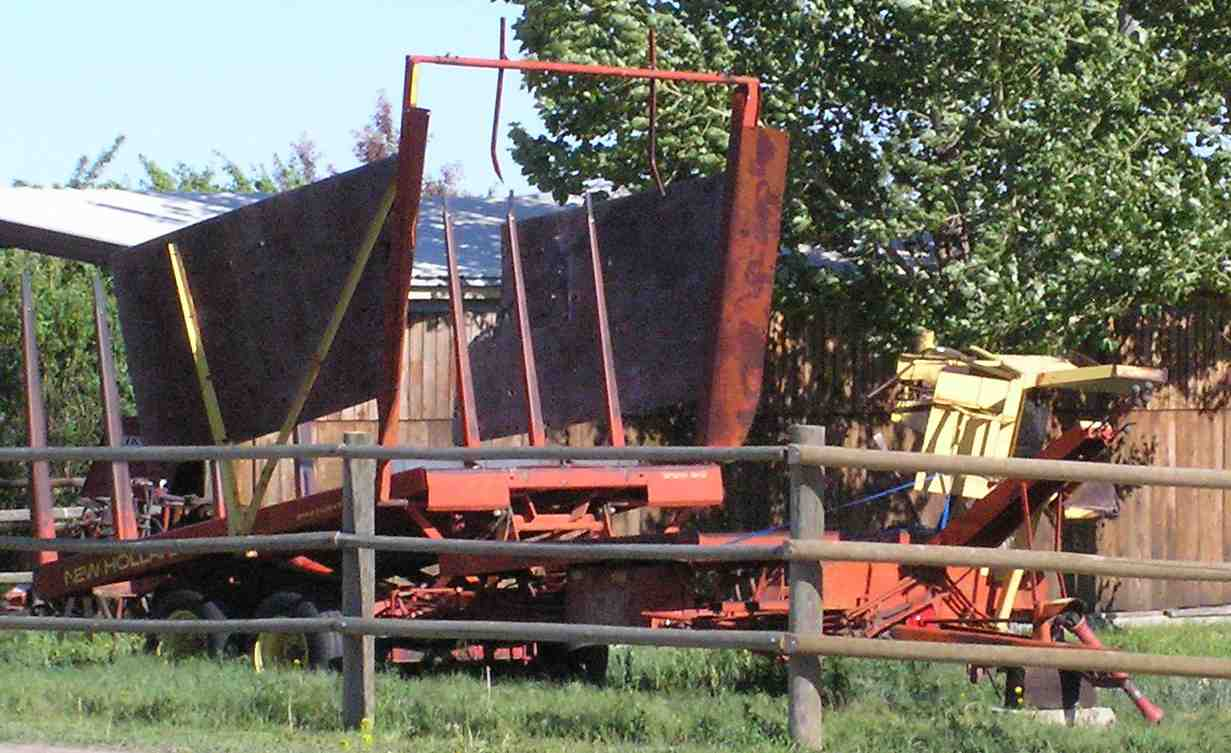
A mechanical hay stacker

Large quantities of small square bales are sometimes gathered with mechanical equipment such as a hay stacker, which can hold up to about 100 hay bales.

The workers generally wear chaps to protect their legs and use hay hooks, long metal hooks with wooden handles, to secure the bales and move them. An apparatus known as an elevator is used to move the bales, conveyor belt style, to levels too high to buck them. Workers are usually paid by the ton or the number of bales. Because the work is labor-intensive, many farmers have made multiple-ton bales that are moved with machines.

Hay bucking competitions are sometimes held at rodeos and county fairs.
