= Single-bamboo drifting =

Chinese water sport

- Traditional Chinese: 獨竹漂
- Simplified Chinese: 独竹漂
Transcriptions
Standard Mandarin
- Hanyu Pinyin: dú zhú piāo

Single-bamboo drifting or duzhu drifting (Chinese: 独竹漂) is a sport traditionally practiced by various people inhabiting the Chishui River basin in Guizhou Province. Practitioners either perform dance movements or race one another using the bamboo log as balance. The practice originated as a way for loggers to transport their lumber elsewhere, but gradually became the modern day practice.

== Description ==
The practice involves standing upright on a bamboo pole as it drifts in a river. Practitioners then perform dance movements as they maintain their balance. The practice was described as "water ballet". As a competitive sport, participants use the pole as a means to race opponents.

== History ==
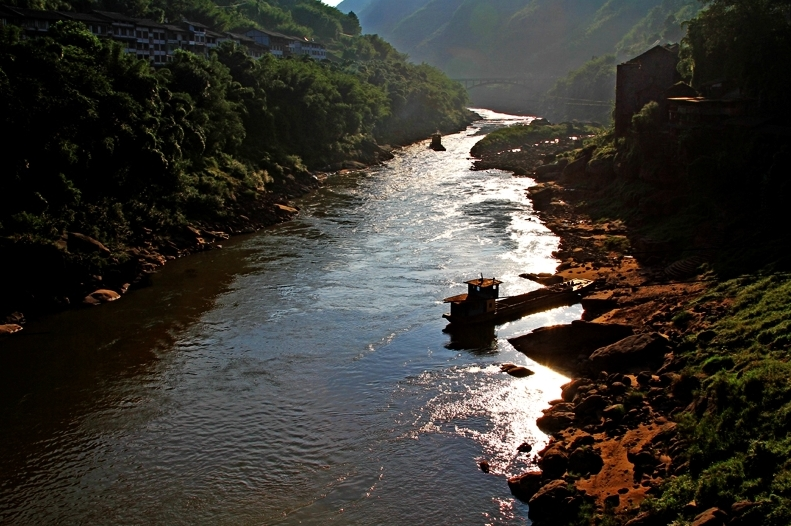
The practice originated in the Chishui River basin as a means for loggers to transport lumber

Single-bamboo drifting originated as a way to travel in the Chishui River basin in the Chinese province of Guizhou. The practice is popular among the Miao people in the province, which had inhabited the Chishui river basin region, but has spread beyond the Miao cultural sphere, and is practiced by various ethnic groups in the region.

Researchers led by Liang and Cheng state that the practice originated a thousand years ago as a way to transport bamboo logs by loggers inhabiting the mountainous and difficult to travel region, as bamboo was an ideal building material at the time. In order to stay caught up to the bamboo, the loggers would jump on the floating log, and the practice eventually became single-bamboo drifting. The rivers, which made the region difficult to travel through, were used by the loggers to travel throughout the otherwise difficult to travel region through the practice of single-bamboo drifting. Loggers would additionally carry a pike for the purposes of balancing.

According to Owen Fishwick at China Daily, the practice began in the Qin dynasty as a way to transport the valuable Nanmu wood logs produced in the Bozhou region via the Chishui River. Loggers would ride the logs to be loaded onto boats down the river to be sent to the ancient capital of Xianyang, as local boats could not fit the logs for transport elsewhere. The practice later changed from a necessity into a more casual activity in the Han dynasty. During the Qing dynasty, practitioners started using bamboo rather than wood logs, as bamboo was a cheaper and more accessible resource.

== Modern practice ==
In modern times the practice has evolved into a performance art and a competitive sport, rather than a necessary means of travel. The practice of single-bamboo drifting has entered use within the National Traditional Games of Ethnic Minorities competition. The sport was introduced in the competition during the 9th national event, held in 2011. Practitioner Yang Liu gained a social media following in Mainland China through her combination of the practice with dance techniques and traditional dress.

== See also ==
- Log driving
