= Pickaroon =

Log-handling tool

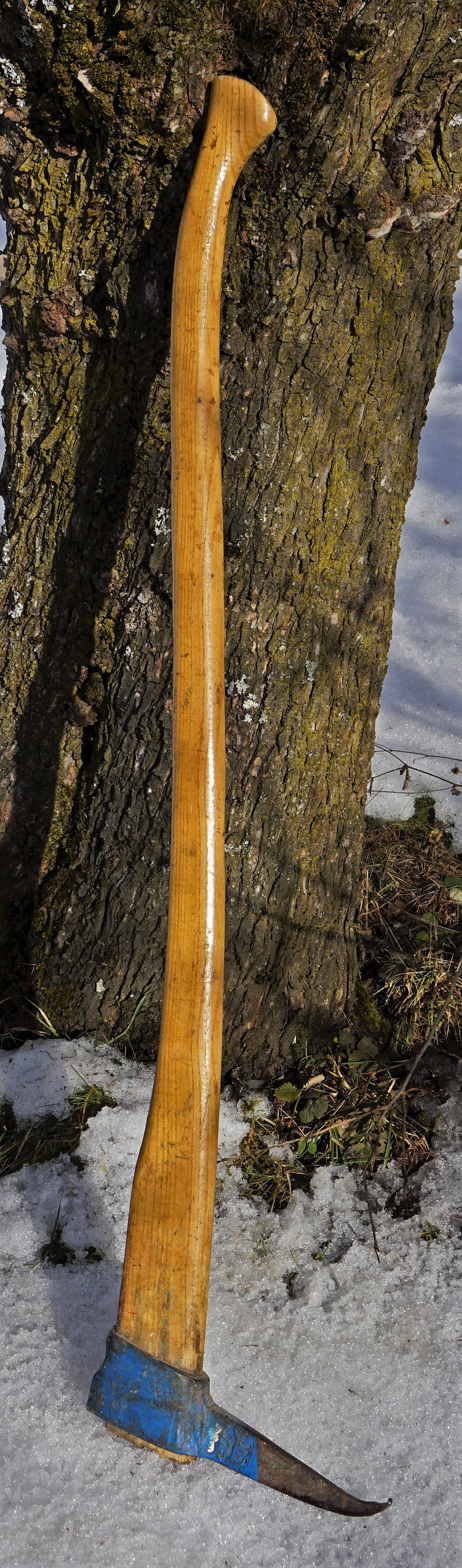
Pickaroon

A pickaroon (or picaroon) is a typically wood-handled (or other material), metal-topped log handling tool that originates from the Alpine Region where it is called a "Sappie", "Zapin", or "Sapine". It is distinguished from a pike pole by having a shorter handle, no metal point, and an opposite curve to its hook (toward the handle rather than away); and from both a cant hook and peavey by having a fixed hook facing its handle rather than a pivoting one facing away.

A pickaroon with a down-turned point on its hook is also known as a hookaroon; one with an axe blade opposite its hook an axaroon, eliminating the need to carry two tools to manage logs.

In the axe collecting hobby, pickaroons can be more expensive, as they are less common than axes and thus are valued at higher prices.

== Usage ==
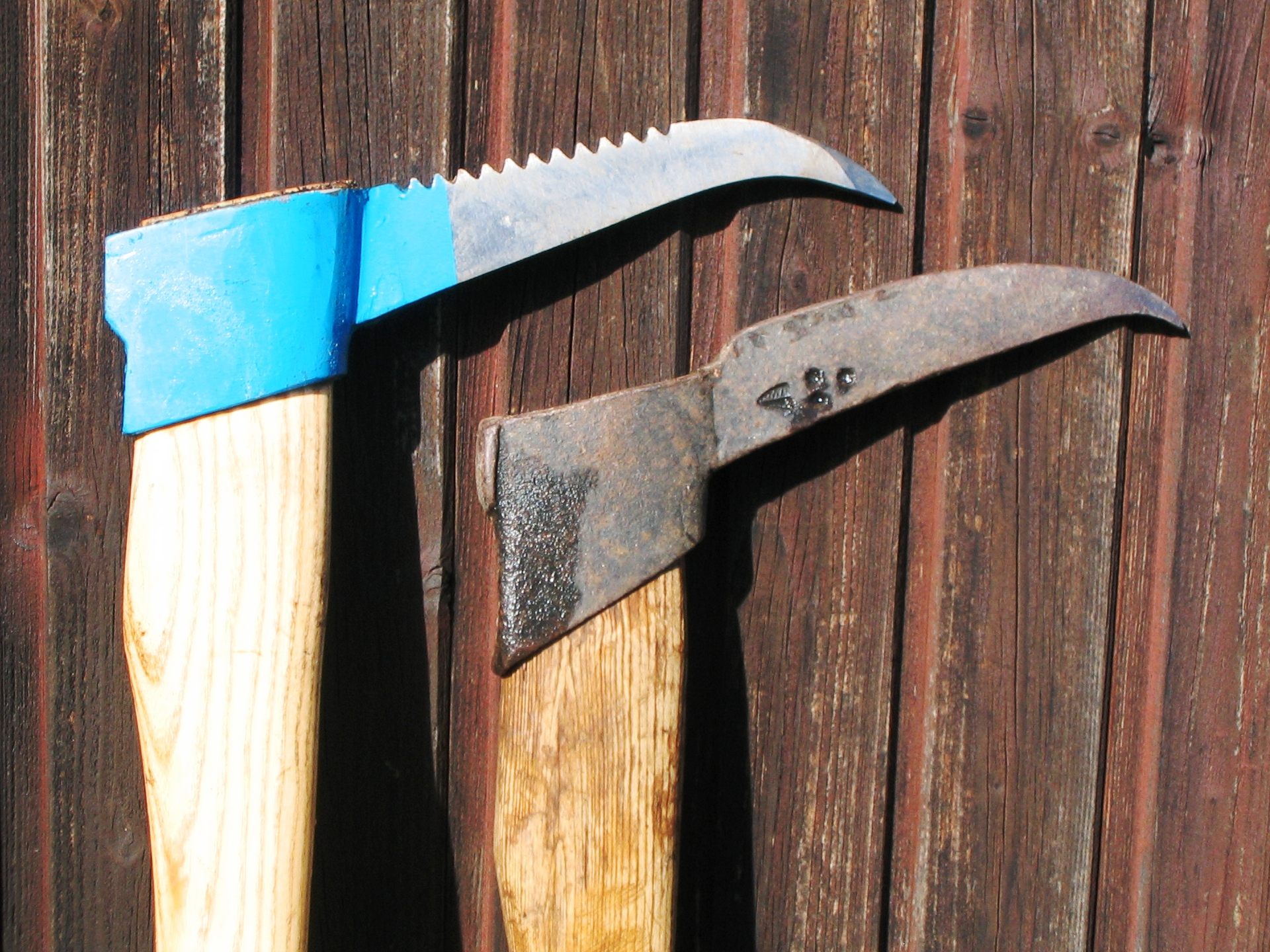
Two types of hookaroons

The hookaroon was developed so that loggers could hold or drag small logs without bending over and risking back strain. Similarly, the pickaroon was developed so that firewood could be more easily released; the user merely makes a flicking motion to do so. Despite being developed to reduce strain, a study of Turkish loggers found that those who use hookaroons are more likely to have accidents, and hookaroon usage was cited alongside smoking, chainsaw usage, and frequent taking of breaks as a factor in accident occurrences.

== Composition ==
A hookaroon can be made by taking an axe head and cutting it in half, keeping the ends of each half narrow.
