= Pike pole =

Hooked pole used as a tool

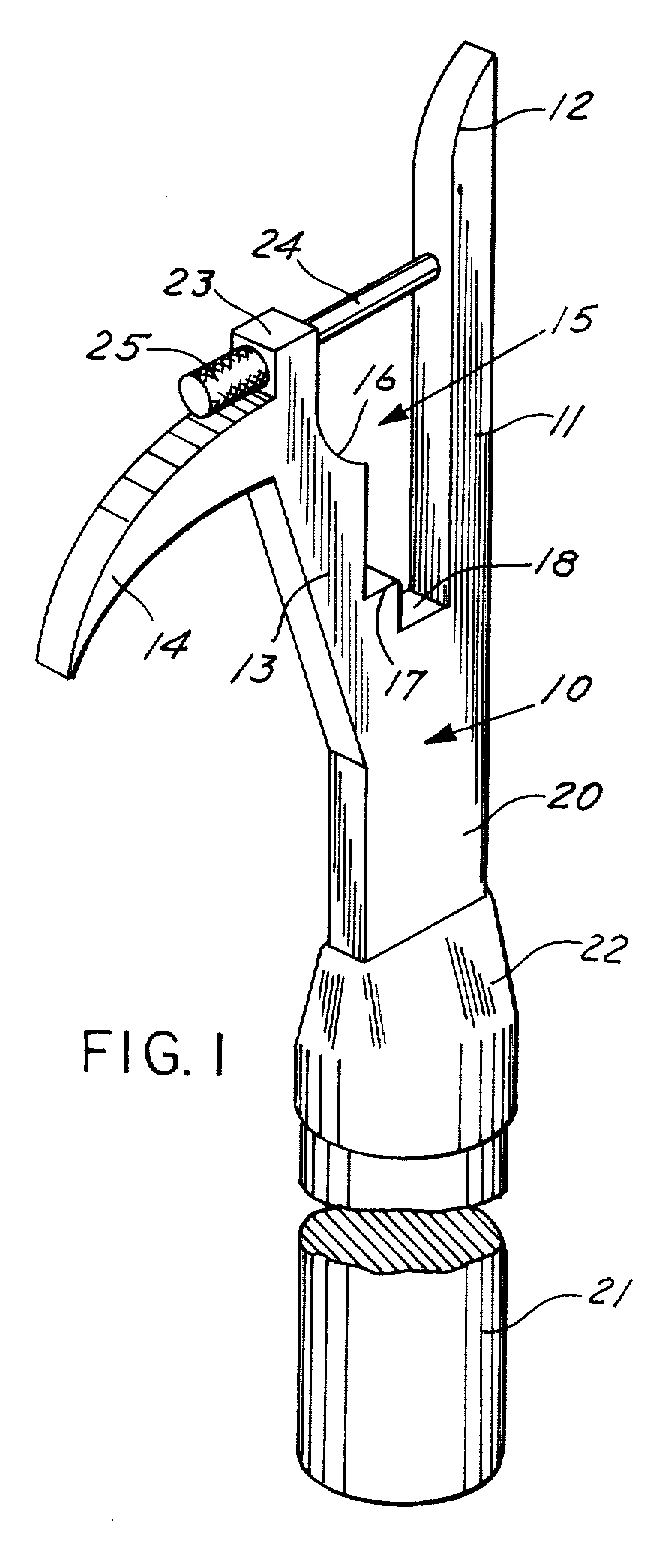
The head of a pike pole with various implements for pulling items

A pike pole is a long metal-topped wooden, aluminium or fiberglass pole used for reaching, hooking and/or pulling on another object. They are variously used in boating, construction, logging, rescue and recovery, power line maintenance, and firefighting.

== Uses ==
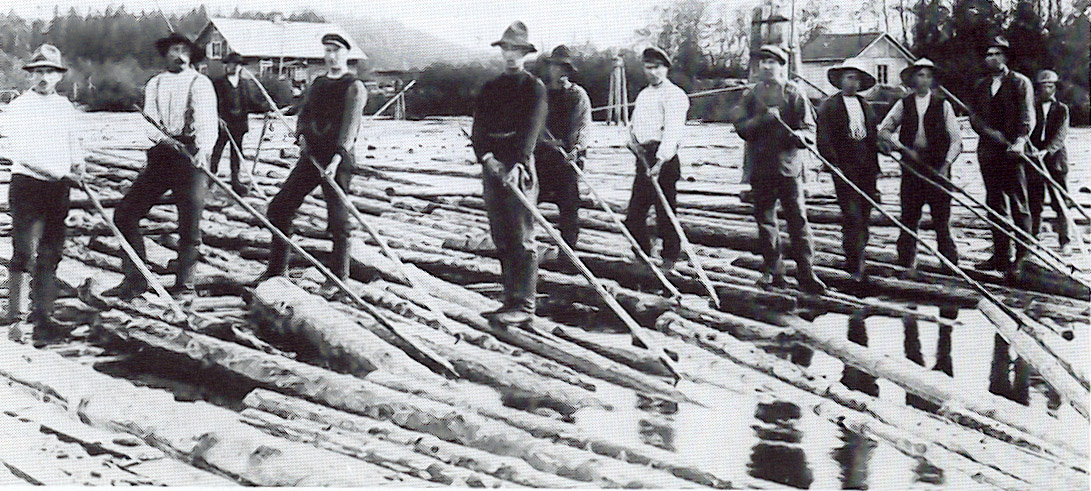
Pike poles being used on a log separation station in River Klarälven in Sweden, 1918

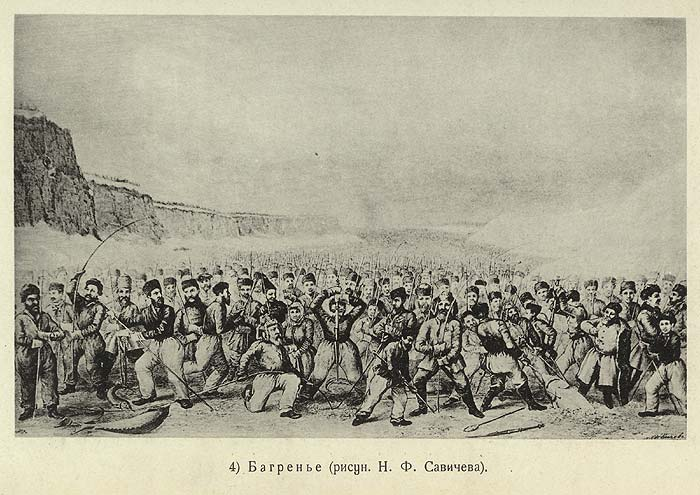
The pike-pole ice fishing day on the Ural

The pole's original use in the fire service was to pull down walls and neighboring buildings to stop a fire's spread. Modern firefighting pike poles are usually of fiberglass, between 4 feet to 12 feet long, and used to search for fires hidden behind walls and ceilings, to pull items from intense heat and flames, and to ventilate structures by breaking windows. Pike poles are routinely used by firefighters as part of fire operations known as "overhaul". The design of a pike pole allows for the pole to be inserted with force into a wall or ceiling and the pole rotated, allowing the hook to grab and pull down large piece of drywall or lath and plaster and exposing wall cavities that may contain fire or hot spots following initial suppression activities. Also known as a ceiling hook, the pike pole is the 'hook' referred to in 'hook and ladder' truck. Although modernized to be made of more durable materials such as fiberglass, the overall design and functionality of a pike pole has remained relatively unchanged despite many other advances in overhaul operations, including positive pressure ventilation and the use of thermal imaging cameras.

In construction pike poles (pick pole, spike pole) are used to lift the sides of timber framed structures, as in barn raising and utility poles. In log driving they are called rafters' hooks and are used to maneuver floating logs.

In lumbering they are used to control logs floating on a river in a log drive and constructing log rafts. Pike poles used in log rafting were originally made of wood, typically spruce or fir. In the mid-1960s they began to be made of aluminum tubing plugged with a wooden knob to maintain buoyancy. Specialized logging tools of similar appearance are the peavey and cant hook.

Pike poles are also used for rescue work to grab people or objects floating in high and rough waters (usually called a boat hook when used onboard a vessel or around maritime facilities).

Linemen use pike poles to maintain power lines. In the early days of line construction pike poles were used to stand up the utility poles.

The tool can also be used in salvage events in such things as constructing water chutes to displace water.

=== Pike pole fishing ===
In the past, pike poles were used for ice fishing, known as bagrenye ryby ("fish pike-poling"; bagor means "pike pole" in Russian). A number of ethnographers note that this way was specific to the Ural River. When fish starts to hybernate, fisherman artels in large numbers put pike poles into ice holes in places known for big fish to crowd, so that a dense forest is made of pike poles. When drifting fish hits a pole, a fisherman feels this and pulls the catch out.

The 1835 Russian Encyclopedic Lexicon describes a tradition of Ural Cossacks ice fishing for sturgeon. The pike-pole ice fishing of sturgeon was traditionally allowed some time after the Orthodox Christmas. On the day of bagrenye, the Cossacks would break the river ice at the known sturgeon hibernating locations, and pull out the disturbed fish with the pike poles. A successful Cossack would sometimes catch as many as 50 sturgeon. Occasionally a beluga was caught, and pulled out by a crowd. Only active-duty Cossacks were allowed to take part in this enterprise.

Compare this with gaff fishing.

== Gallery of pike poles ==
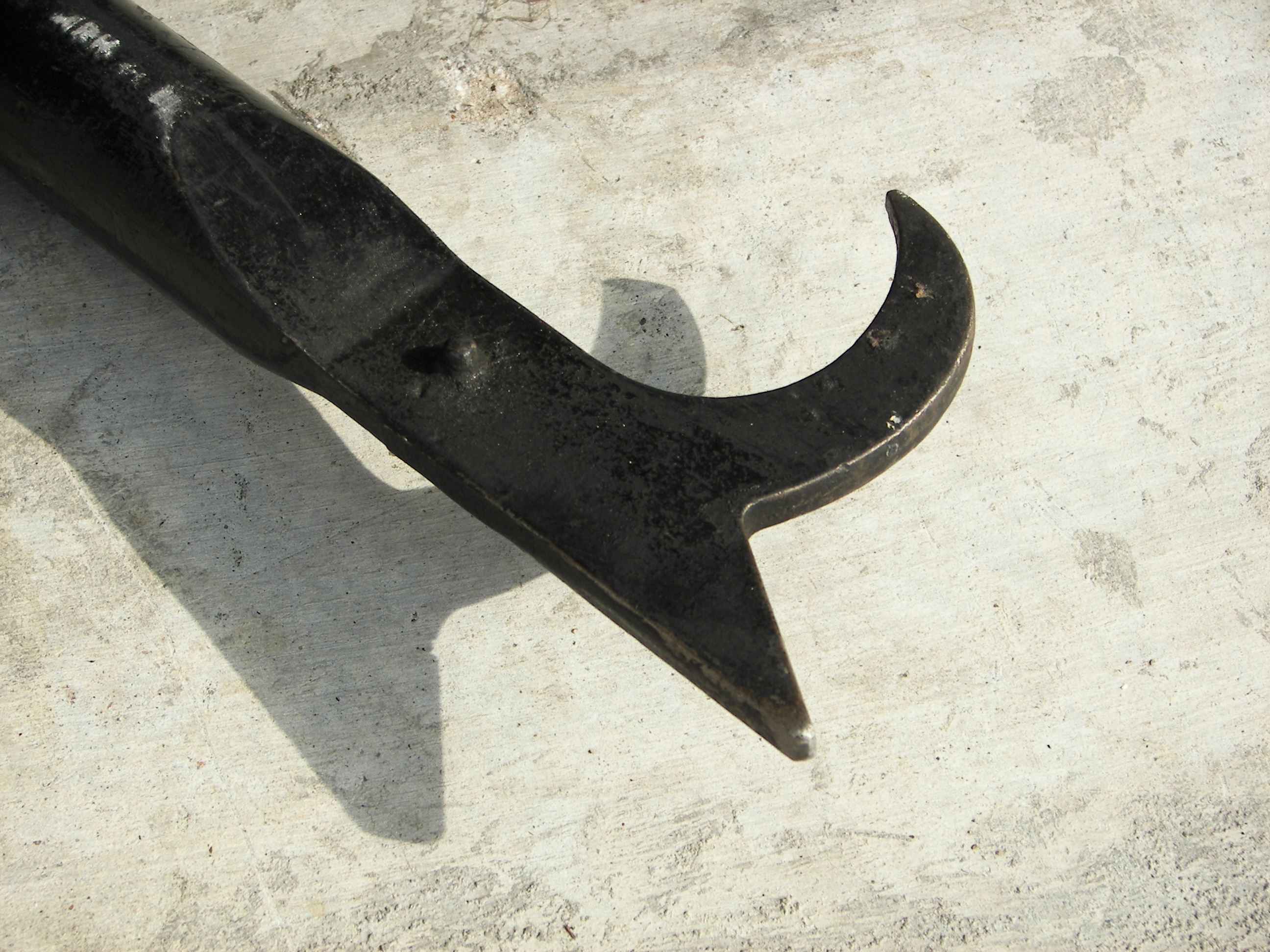
The head of a short firefighter's pike pole

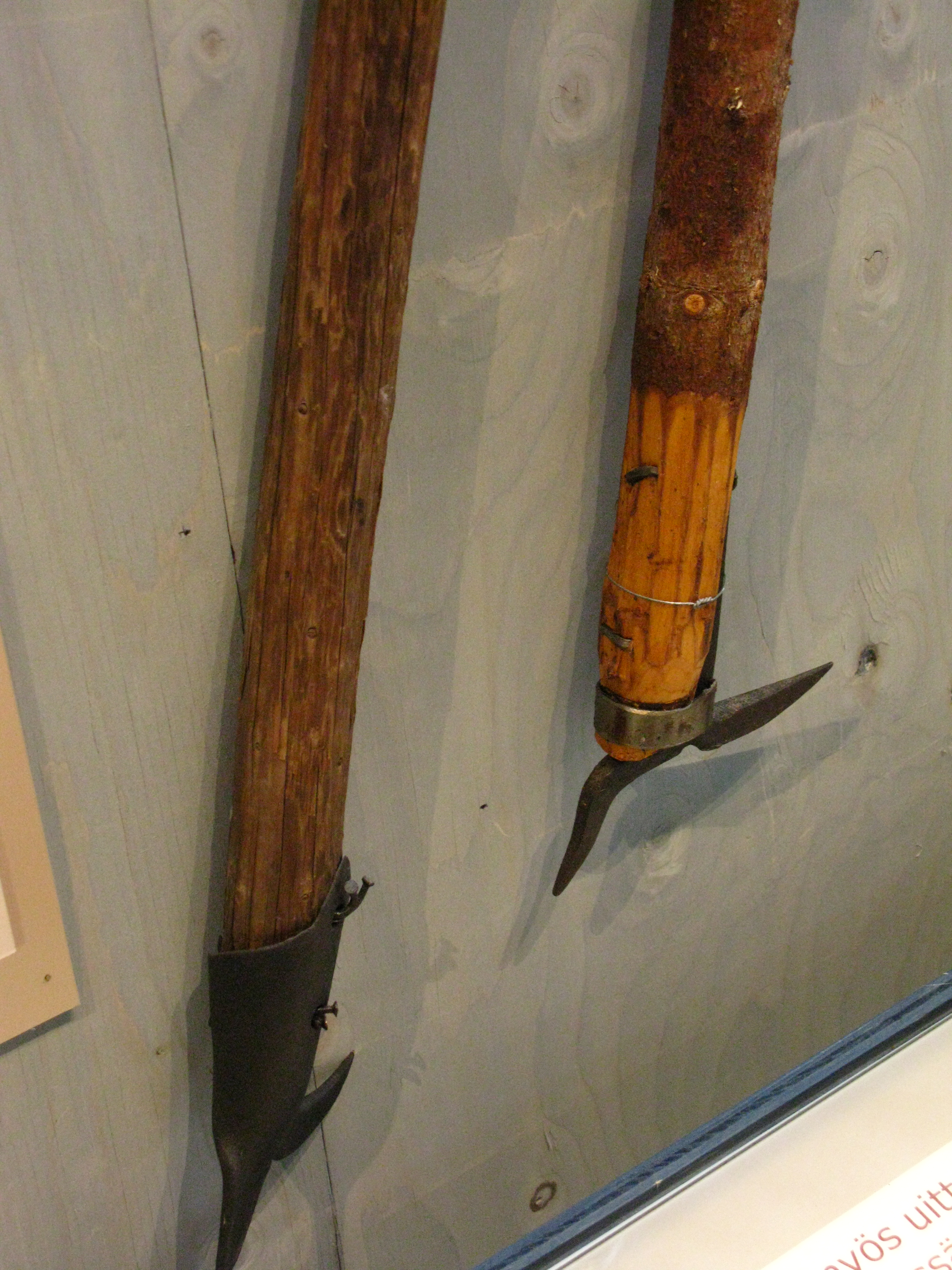
Pike pole heads of the type often used in river drives. These are displayed in the forestry museum Lusto in Punkaharju, Finland.

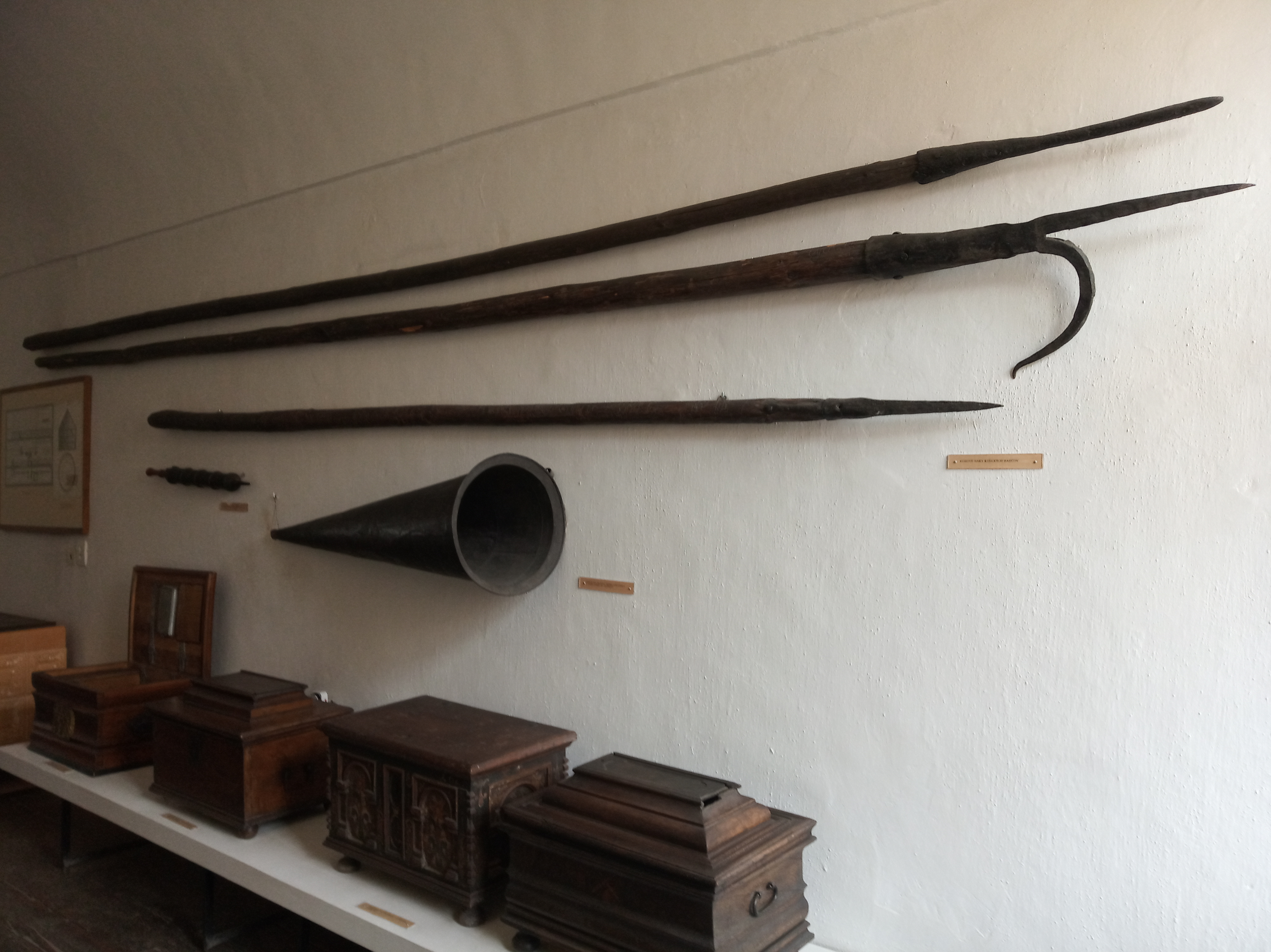
Historical fire-fighting pike poles of Košice municipal firemen (East Slovak Museum permanent exhibitions)

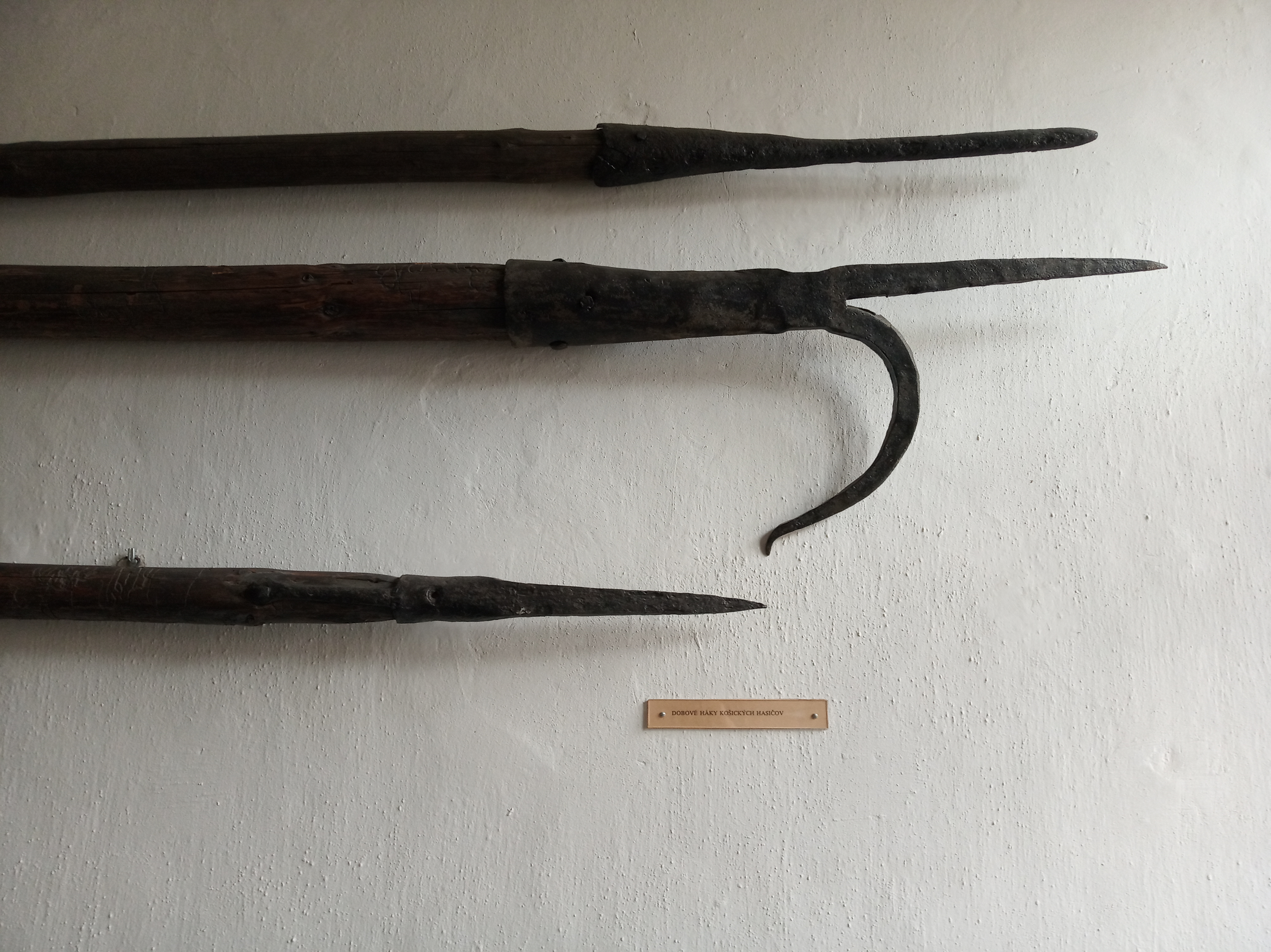
Historical fire-fighting pike poles of Košice municipal firemen (East Slovak Museum permanent exhibitions)

== Pike poles in heraldry ==
In heraldry, pike poles are seen in all colors.

Fet Municipality, Norway

Głubczyce, Poland

Kontiolahti, Finland

Krün, Germany (with an abbot's crook)

Marktrodach, Germany

Nordre Land Municipality, Norway

Orpund, Switzerland (with a raft paddle)

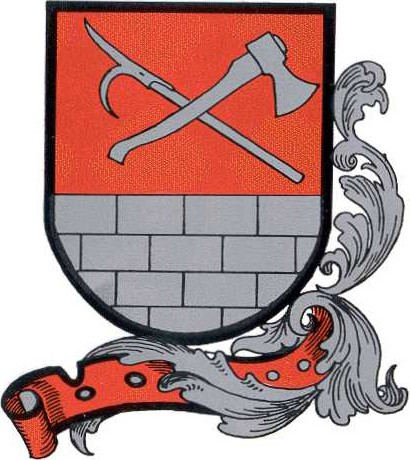
Palfau, Austria (with an axe)

Schwäbisch Hall district, Germany (with an inverted trammel hook)

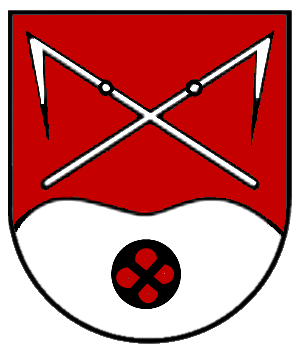
Sinningen, Germany

Suodenniemi, Finland

Villingendorf, Germany

== See also ==
- Boat hook
- Cant hook
- Guisarme
- Pike (weapon), specifically Goedendag
