= Boat hook =

Boating equipment

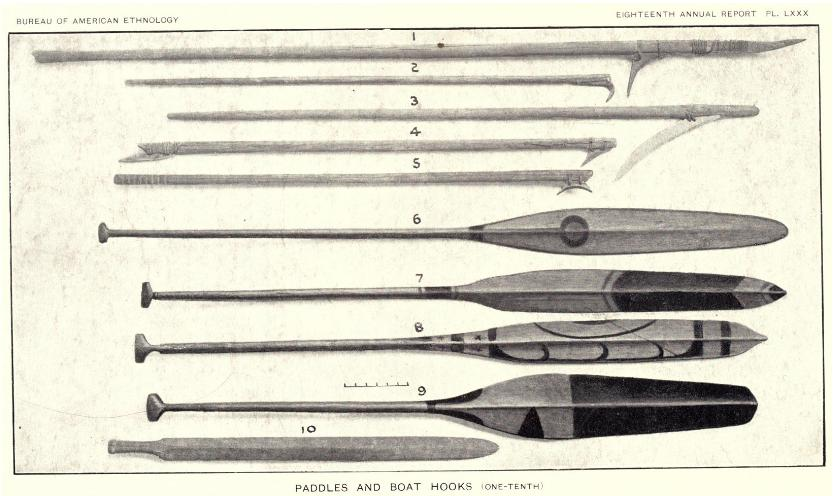
Yu'pik boathooks and paddles

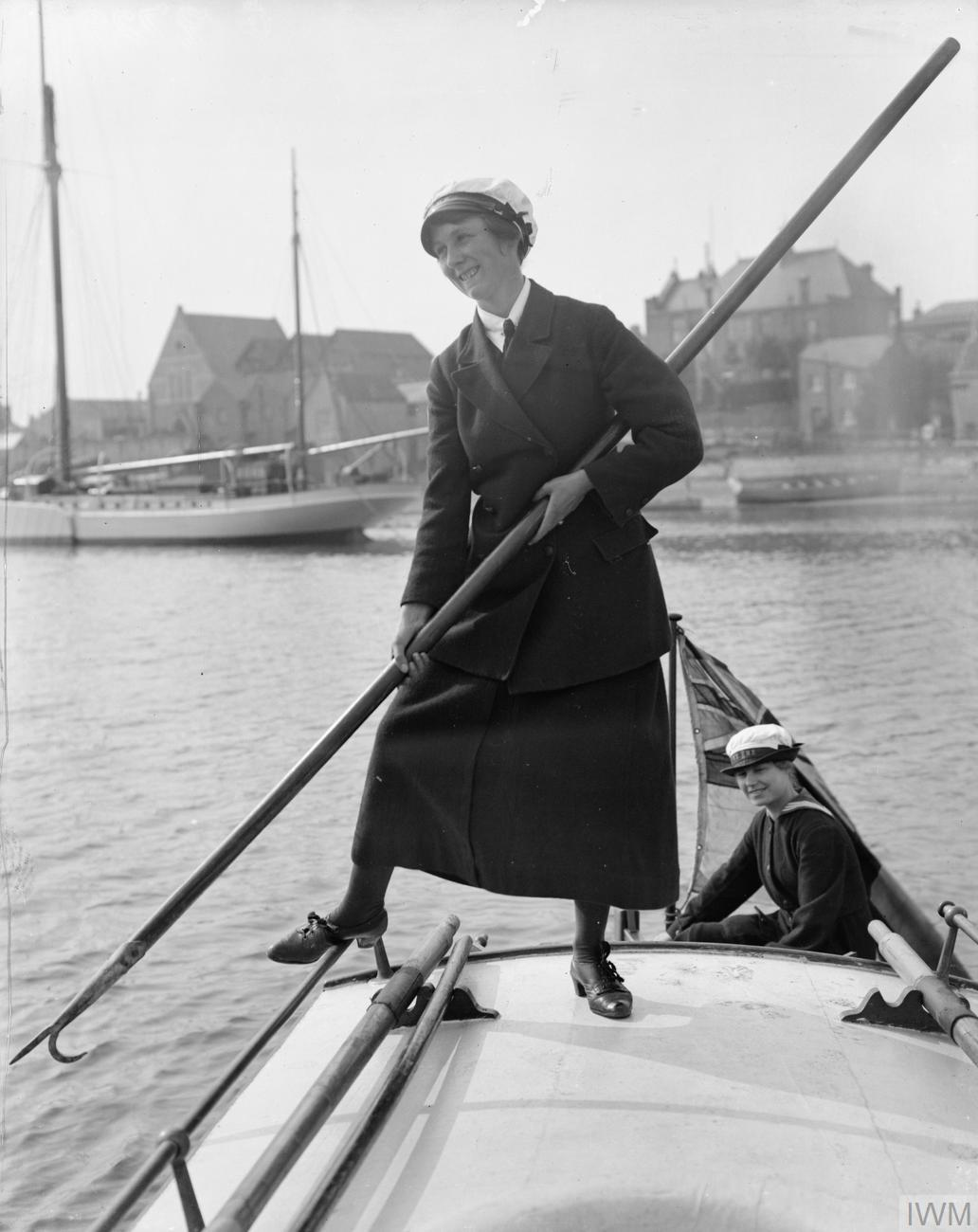
A motor boat driver holding a boat hook during World War I

A boat hook is part of boating equipment. Its most common use is as a docking and undocking aid. It may be similar to a pike pole, however it commonly has a blunt tip, for pushing during undocking, with a hook for docking. In addition, it may have a line attached to the other end, which may have a ring for this purpose.

It may be also used for pulling things out of water, such as debris or people, as well as for other fetching tasks and holding-off from other boats or landings.

== History ==
Evidence of boat hooks has been found from ancient Rome and the painting The Storm on the Sea of Galilee, by Rembrandt van Rijn was painted in 1633 and clearly shows one in its familiar form.

== Traditional ==
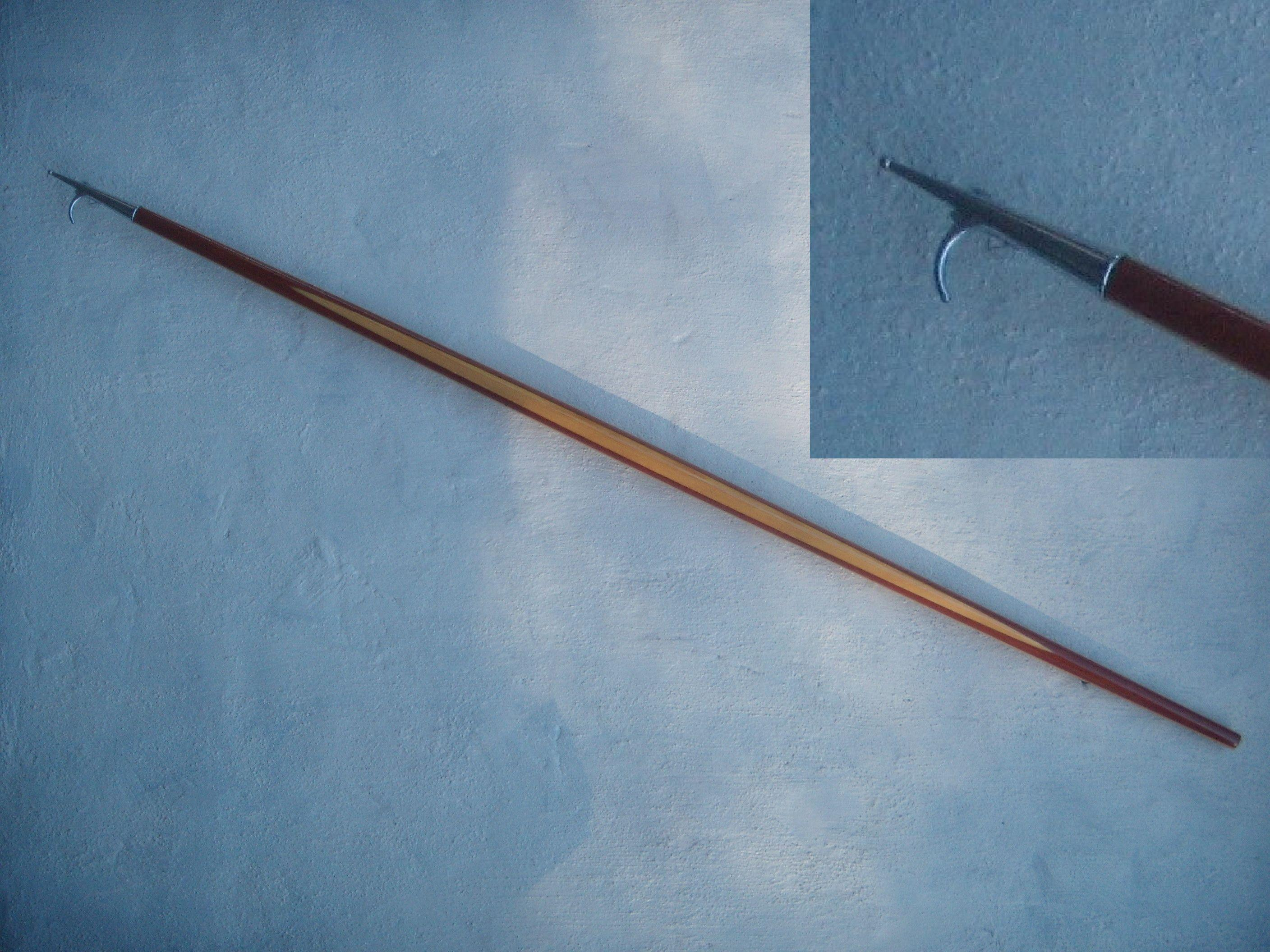
Traditional Boat Hook

A traditional European boat hook pole is around 1.8- 2.4M and is typically made of ash- one of the best woods for poles, such as spears etc. It would have a brass hook- a non-rusting metal common on traditional boat fittings. The hook end would usually have a hook on one side for pulling and catching things, plus a rounded point for pushing things.

== Modern Styles ==
Although the traditional boat hook is still available, various different materials, such as aluminium and even a rolled up polymer are now available. Although the boat hook is a general purpose reaching and holding-off tool on boats, there are more specialised forms, such as the Recovery Pole designed for length rather than the rigid strength of a boat hook.

== Boat hook drill ==
In the Royal Navy, during ceremonial occasions the Ceremonial Boat Hook Drill must be performed during berthing and unberthing.
