= Jacques du Chevreul =

French mathematician, astronomer, and philosopher (1595–1649)

Jacques du Chevreul (born 1595 in Coutances, France; died 1649 in Paris) was a French mathematician, astronomer, and philosopher.

Du Chevreul grew up in an educated household and was the son of a magistrate. In 1616, he received a Master of Arts for studying humanities and philosophy at the University of Paris. Du Chevreul continued education at a higher level and received a Bachelor of Divinity for theology in 1619. He did not start teaching until 1620 when he remained associated with College Harcourt and University of Paris, up until two years before his death when he taught philosophy at the College Royal. Throughout his lifetime Jacques du Chevreul held various teaching and administrative positions including principal and rector. Little is known about his later life. Although he studied subjects such as philosophy, logic, ethics, metaphysics, and physics, he published his two popular books on mathematics. Arithmetica (1622) and Sphaera (1623, 1640, and 1649) were both published in Paris, France. Sphaera, du Chevreul's most popular book was about his view of the world and the universe. He used references from the Bible, Aristotle, and Plato to reject the Copernican model and instead created his own eccentric-epicycle geocentric model of the universe. Du Chevreul believed that the Earth was the center of the universe, but that the major planets Venus and Mercury orbited around the Sun. He theorized that there were wandering and fixed stars in the heavens and there were a total of thirteen planets in his model. The heavens were in the order of the Moon, the Sun (Mercury and Venus orbited around the Sun), Mars, Jupiter surrounded by four Medicean stars, Saturn with two satellites, and above all these levels resided God. Du Chevreul's cosmic scheme is a highly original attempt to resist Copernicanism and accommodate Galileo's telescopic discoveries in an Aristotelian cosmos.

== Early life and career ==
Jacques du Chevreul was born 1595 in Cotounces which is a commune in the Manche department in Normandy in north-western France. He was born a year earlier than René Descartes, and died a year before Descartes as well. Unlike Descartes, du Chevreul was always associated with a university, specifically the University of Paris and the College of Harcourt. He was the son of a magistrate, a civil officer or judge who administers the law. Descartes’ father was also a magistrate, adding to their similarities. Jacques du Chevreul's father held a Master's of Law from Poitiers. Although his father studied law, Du Chevreul decided to take his career in a different direction.

He started his education in humanities and philosophy in which he received a master's degree (Master of Arts) from the University of Paris in 1616. After receiving his master's degree, unlike many of his peers, he decided to continue his education in the higher faculty of theology and received the degree of Bachelor of Divinity in 1619. Du Chevreul held Aristotelian views on mathematics and began a teaching career in 1620 at Harcourt, which is another commune in the Normandy region of northern France. He taught primarily philosophy, but also some mathematics. The duration of the philosophy course was two years, and it consisted of a year of Logic and Ethics followed by another year of Metaphysics and Physics. From the 1620s to the 1640s, Jacques du Chevreul was a professor at the University of Paris. In the years 1623 through 1626 and 1633 through 1634, du Chevreul taught the Logic and Ethics curriculum. In the years 1628 through 1629 and 1634 through 1635, du Chevreul taught the Metaphysics and Physics curriculum. Two years prior to his death, du Chevreul also worked at the Collège Royal as a professor of philosophy. Jacques du Chevreul died in the year 1649 in Paris, France.

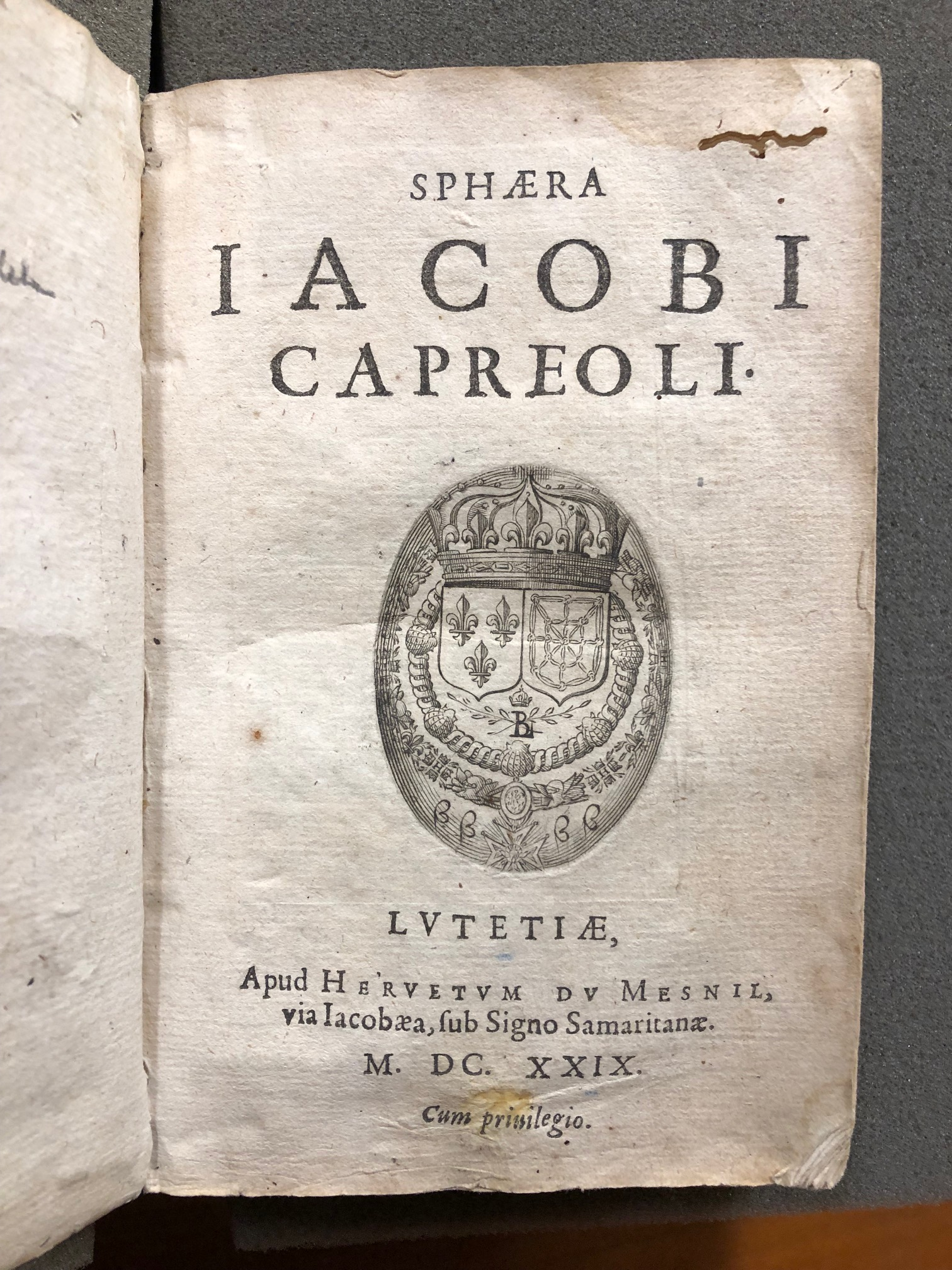
Title page of Sphaera published in Paris in 1629. Reproduced from an original copy in History of Science Collections, University of Oklahoma Libraries.

Although he did not publish his philosophy lectures, he did publish two mathematical texts. The mathematical curriculum in the early 17th century was divided into the quadrivium, the four liberal arts of arithmetic, geometry, music, and astronomy together with optics and other mathematically based disciplines. During his time at the University of Paris, du Chevreul published two mathematical works, Arithmetica in 1622 and Sphaera in 1623. The basis of astronomical teaching at the time was the textbook genre known as the Sphere.

=== Sphaera ===
This publication consists of ten chapters in which six chapters commentate on the four-part mathematical textbook Sphere written by Sacrobosco. Jacques du Chevreul diverged from the basic structure of work done by commentators originating in the Middle Ages by dividing his commentary into 10 chapters rather than the expected four parts. The four parts of the original Sphereare as follows:

Part I consists of a discussion of the sphere, such as defining its center and axis, as well as a discussion on the shape of the universe and the number of concentric spheres in it. Part II contains a list of some of the circles marked on the surface of the various spheres. Part III includes a list of astronomical signs with a discussion of their risings and settings and day inequalities. Part IV contains a discussion of the causes of motion and eclipses.

Several of the chapters corresponded with the four parts:

Chapters 1 and 2 of du Chevreul's book, De definitionibus and De figura mundi, summarize Part 1 of Sacrobosco's Sphere. Chapter 3, De ordine partium, contains mostly new material and covers Copernicus and the Copernican topic of the arrangement of the spheres. Chapters 5 and 7, De circulis coelestibus and De eclipsibus, cover the same topics as Parts II and IV of Sacrobosco's Sphere. Chapter 9, De accidentibus sphaerae, includes sections of Part III, in particular astronomical signs and periods such as days and nights.

Four other chapters discuss information beyond the original four-part Sphere. The four new chapters are chapters four, six, eight, and ten. The ten chapters of Sphaera are as follows:

Chapter 1 De definitionibus

In this chapter, du Chevreul explains why the shape of the world is spherical, providing four arguments. The first argument is that a sphere is the ideal shape as it has largest volume. A sphere is also suitable for circular motion and rotation along its axis. His second argument states that spheres are needed because they do not allow for vacuums to pierce through itself. Since vacuums are not on Earth, the shape must be something that does not allow vacuums to exist within it. Du Chevreul's third argument states that since heavy object fall toward the center and light object move away from the center, a sphere is created. His last argument of this chapter states that stars are fixed in place and each have a unique distance from Earth.

Chapter 2 De figura mundi

In this chapter, du Chevreul applies his conclusions from the previous chapter to state that the Earth is spherical. Du Chevreul states some additional evidence such as the fixed stars rising and setting throughout the day. Du Chevreul also mentions how as one moves further north, stars move closer to the horizon. He also mentions that there is a circular shadow on the Moon during an eclipse as arguments for a spherical Earth.

Chapter 3 De ordine partium

This chapter discusses du Chevreul's comments on the Copernican system. Du Chevreul begins by describing the Copernican system and then states that this system is faulty. Du Chevreul references Plato, Aristotle, and scriptures from the Bible as examples against the Copernican system. He then states that the Copernican system also defies physics because the Earth is a single body but it requires to two motions, a diurnal and an annual motion. Du Chevreul also objects to Copernican idea that the Earth moves closer and further away from the fixed stars. According to this theory, these stars would change brightness depending on closeness of the Earth which is something that has not been seen. However, du Chevreul does not dispute Copernicus on his idea that the Sun is the center of the universe instead of the Earth. Du Chevreul states that Mercury orbiting the Sun is not contradictory to physics or biblical scriptures. Du Chevreul completes this chapter discussing parallax, namely how there is a parallax for planets but not for fixed stars.

Chapter 4 De stellis

Chapter four discusses du Chevreul's belief of what constitutes the heavens. Du Chevreul states that he does not know for certain what material the heavens are made from, but theorizes that stars are simply condensed sections of the heavens. In particular, he believes that stars are likely denser and rarer parts of the heavens. According to du Chevreul, the extent of the density of certain stars is related to the amount of light is released. This theory protects the idea that the heavens are unchangeable, or incorruptible, given that qualities such as hot, cold, dry, and moist can not be seen within the heavens. This theory was proposed in Aristotelian physics which is also upheld in the Bible.

Chapter 5 De circulis coelestibus

Du Chevreul then separates stars into two categories, fixed and wandering. Wandering stars include the seven planets that are observed by Aristotle, Plato, and others up to present time. These planets or stars include Saturn, Jupiter, Mars, Venus, Mercury, the Sun, and the Moon. Additionally, there are the four planets, known as the Medician stars, that orbit Jupiter as well as two planets that orbit Saturn, known as Saturnines, that were discovered by Galileo. Including these 13 celestial bodies, there are 30 others that du Chevreul recognizes called the Bourbon stars, which circle the Sun. These stars were also named by Jean Tarde.

Chapter 6 De caelorum numero

Chapter 6 "The Number of Heaven" is about his personal thoughts on the number of heavens, which differed from many other astronomers before him. Prior astronomers, in particular Plato and Aristotle, believed the number of heavens to be at minimum eight due to their different motions. Another astronomer, Eustachius a Sancto Paulo, believed there were seven planetary heavens: the Moon, Mercury, Venus, the Sun, Mars, Jupiter, and Neptune. He also had firmament as the eighth sphere, the crystal heaven for a ninth and tenth, the primum mobile as an eleventh, and ending with the Empyrean heaven being located above it in his 1609 Summa philosophica quadripartita. Unlike the astronomers before him, du Chevreul only counts five planetary heavens. He only counts Saturn, Jupiter, Mars and the heavens of the Moon and the Sun. He doesn't include the heavens of the newest planets of the time, Venus and Mercury. He did not include Venus and Mercury because as seen in the optical tube, Mercury and Venus can be found above, below, and next to the Sun and thus circle around the Sun. Du Chevreul believed that no other interpretation of this phenomenon would be possible in nature due to the requirement of a vacuum. Du Chevreul notes that Venus and Mercury are placed above the Sun by notable astronomers Plato and Aristotle while astronomers Ptolemy, Regiomontanus, and Sacrobosco placed the planets below the Sun. Jacques du Chevreul believed that the correct placement of Venus and Mercury required an optical instrument, and thus only astronomers of his generation could see that Venus and Mercury orbited the Sun. Du Chevreul's five heavens are, from center to outskirts: 1. The Moon, 2. The Sun, surrounded by the Bourbon stars, Mercury, and Venus, 3. Mars, 4. Jupiter, surrounded by four Medicean stars, and 5. Saturn, with two concentric orbs. The firmament is located above the planetary heavens, with the celestial waters above the heavens and lastly the Empyrean Heaven; both of which are required by the Sacred Scriptures.

Chapter 7 De eclipsibus

Chapter 7 "Of Eclipses" talks about the same things as The Traditional Part 2 and Part 4.

Chapter 8 De eccentricis et epicyclis

Chapter 9 De accidentibus sphaerae

Chapter 9 "From accidentibus sphere" includes part of the Traditional Part 3, which is about astronomical signs and periods such as days and nights.

Chapter 10 De calculo ecclesiastico

== Jacques du Chevreul’s depiction of the Universe ==
The seventeenth century, a two-dimensional model drawn by du Chevreul was meant to be grasped as a solid, however the technology was not available to make a three-dimensional layout. Jacques du Chevreul's eccentric-epicycle geocentric template of the universe had elements like previous astronomers Ptolemy and Aristotle and modifications based on Galileo's telescopic observations. The model, created in 1623 had, unlike other geocentric models of its time, sunspots rotating about the Sun, in the form of the Bourbon Planets suggested by Jean Tarde. Planets Mercury, Venus, Mars, Jupiter, and Saturn were also in rotation around the Earth. Two planets Jupiter and Saturn, had each been given moons surrounding them, with Jupiter having four and Saturn given two. The sunspots that du Chevreul incorporated into his depiction caused mixed interpretations between professions. Some mathematicians did not acknowledge such claims while schoolmen widely around France had followed Tarde's suggestion and thought the sunspots were small planets, as in du Chevreul's depiction. In the traditional view of that time no modifications he made to his earlier model needed to be significantly changed although Jacques did make changes to Mercury and Venus planet phases, the moons of Jupiter, sunspots, and the handles that surrounded the planet Saturn. Du Chevreul also accounted for the lunar spots/sunspots as celestial matter condensations and rarefactions. Through the modifications, du Chevreul's depiction of the universe maintained its spherical form, its central Earth, and epicyclic-eccentric model.

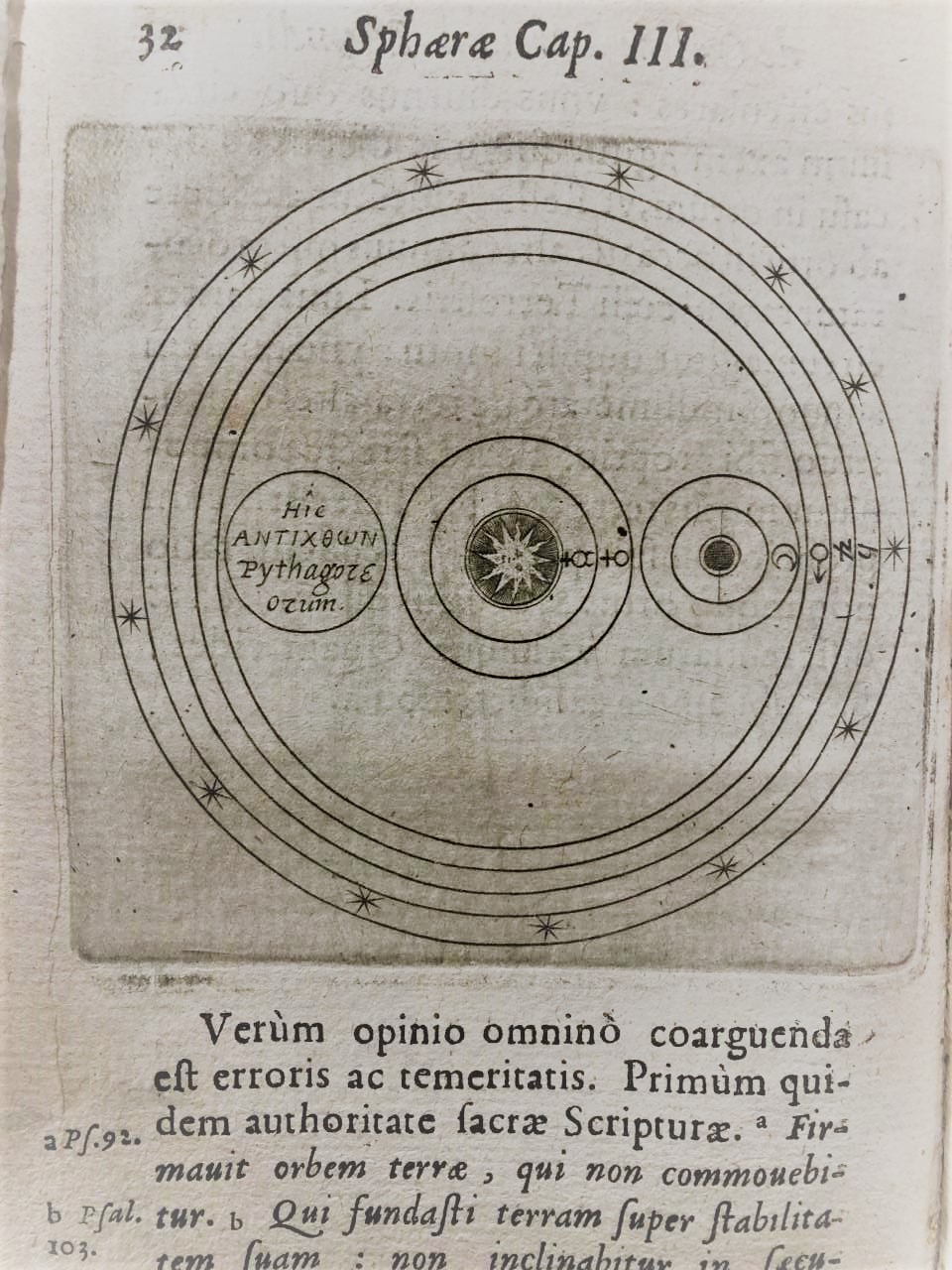
In this image, Jacques du Chevreul displays the Earth, the Moon, and the planets in a 3 o'clock Copernican arrangement. Opposite of the Earth, but in the same orb, at 9 o'clock, du Chevreul adds the counter-Earth required by original Pythagoreans. Reproduced from an original copy in History of Science Collections, University of Oklahoma Libraries.

== Du Chevreul on the shape and position of the Earth ==
Du Chevreul argued that the shape of the Earth was spherical for many reasons in Sphaera:

1. Its fitness: A sphere has a larger capacity than other shapes and it can rotate around its axis because it is well accommodated to circular motion. The Earth is massive and contains so much within it. It also rotates on its axis. Therefore, it must be a sphere.
2. Its necessity: If the world were not spherical, a vacuum would have to exist. Vacuums do not exist in earth's nature; therefore it must be a shape that is impenetrable.
3. The nature of things: Based on natural events such as gravity, the movement of the Earth's crust, and meteorological events such as cloud formation, it can be concluded that the Earth must have a spherical shape.
4. The appearances: Stars are fixed, and yet each has a unique distance from the earth. Additionally, stars rise and set during the night, and their distance with respect to the horizon changes as one changes his/her position on the Earth.
5. During a lunar eclipse, the Earth's shadow is circular in shape.

Du Chevreul rejected the Copernican theories on the system of the universe for many reasons. First, he believed that the Earth was at the center of the universe and did not orbit. He used the teachings of Plato, Aristotle, and other philosophers and astrologers who asserted this geocentric idea and cited Plato in the Timaeus and Phaedo and Aristotle in the De caelo. Second, he looked to passages in the Bible for theological support. One passage stated that when God created the Earth, he did not intend for it to move. Another passage referenced the miracle witnessed by the biblical character Joshua in which God halted the movement of the Sun and the Moon. The use of Biblical Scriptures was consistent with the 1616 condemnation of Copernicanism by the Catholic Church as well as du Chevreul's own views on religion and astronomy. Du Chevreul also argued that Copernicus's theories were inconsistent with the physics concerning the motion of a simple body because Copernicus believed the simple body- the Earth- would have two motions however simple bodies can only have a single and simple motion. Even though he claimed that Earth was at the center of the universe, du Chevreul also claimed that Venus and Mercury orbited the Sun. The root of this theory was his claim that spots seen on the Sun are actually Venus and Mercury rather than the fact that they have phases like the Moon.

== Du Chevreul on the Heavens ==
On the heavens, particularly on the question of whether or not they can change, du Chevreul took a probabilistic approach, and theorized that the brightness of the stars indicated how dense and how rare they were. He classified stars into two categories: stars that did not move (fixed) and stars that did move (wandering). He classified the planets, the Sun, and the Moon as wandering stars. Following in the steps of Aristotle and Plato, he confirmed that there are seven wandering stars: Saturn, Jupiter, Mars, the Sun, Venus, Mercury, and the Moon. However, he also counted the four Medician stars that orbit Jupiter, which were discovered by Galileo, and he counted the two planets that orbit Saturn. Therefore, he counted thirteen planets in all.

du Chevreul believed that Aristotle's observations should in general be taken into consideration; however there were some points where du Chevreul disagreed with him such as the number of levels in the heavens. According to Aristotle, along with Plato, the number of levels of the heavens was at least eight, which included Saturn, Venus, Mercury, Jupiter, Mars, the Sun, the Moon, and the stars. du Chevreul had a different theory in which he counted only five levels: Saturn, Jupiter, Mars, the Sun, and the Moon. Unlike his predecessors who either argued that Venus and Mercury were above the Sun or below it, du Chevreul asserted all of the above. Since Venus and Mercury orbit the Sun, du Chevreul deduced, they could be found both above and below it. Thus, Venus and Mercury were located within the Sun's level and did not have levels of their own. The following are du Chevreul's levels of the heavens in order, with Earth located at the center:

1. The Moon
2. The Sun, in which Mercury and Venus circulate around the Sun
3. Mars
4. Jupiter, in which the four Medicean stars circulate around Jupiter
5. Saturn, in which two planets circulate around Saturn

Keeping in line with biblical scriptures, du Chevreul claimed that above all these levels was the celestial waters and where God resigned, known as the Empyrean Heaven.

== Jacques du Chevreul's thoughts on other astronomers ==
Jacques du Chevreul's observations were in line with Galileo's observations as he accepted all of the 1610-1613 telescope findings. These findings were: more stars, four moons around Jupiter, the “handles” of Saturn from Starry Messenger (1610), as well as “sunspots” and phases of Venus from Letters on Sunspots (1613). Instead interpreting the “handles” of Saturn as two moons that orbit around Saturn and sunspots as small planets orbiting the Sun. Jacques du Chevreul modified Aristotelianism to account for Galileo's observations, however does not specifically credit Galileo. Du Chevreul also accepted Galileo's other observations that cooperated with Aristotelian astronomy, as seen in the chapter covering eccentric and epicyclic orbs, De ordine partium. Eccentrics are crucial because the parallax, their distances from the center of the world, of planets are changeable, or vary as shown through astronomical observations. Epicycles are also necessary because planets can slow down or speed up, as seen through astronomical observations.

Jacques du Chevreul agreed with Galileo's observations with one exception. Galileo discovered that the Moon had mountains and valleys that were similar to those of the Earth. du Chevreul's response to this was that if the Moon did have mountains and valleys, then the Moon would also have areas of empty space, which nature does not allow. Instead, du Chevreul believed that what Galileo had seen were actually the varying densities of the Moon and Galileo did not make a direct observation, instead making an inference based on a false assumption. Just as a star's brightness indicates its density and rarity, so does the variance of brightness on the Moon.

Another astronomer's observations that Jacques du Chevreul rejected were those of Tycho Brahe. He not only rejected the Tychonic description of the heavens, but he also rejected Brahe's theory that Mars was below the Sun. Jacques de Chevreul argued that Mars cannot be located below the Sun, because for that to occur the heavens would have to be permeable which directly contradicts the appearances. He continued on in his section on the matter of the world and denied the language that Tycho followers used. For example, the verbiage that the stars wander in the heavens like fish swimming in water was contrary to what Jacques du Chevreul believed. Additionally, to accept Brahe's theories of the universe was to reject eccentrics and epicycles, as well as the planetary heavens being liquid and permeable, which du Chevreul was not willing to do as it entailed making more adjustments to traditional astronomy. He argued for the existence of eccentrics because observations had shown that as planets orbited, their distance from the center of the universe varied. Epicycles, he claimed, revealed the idea that the planets vary in their speed as they orbit around the center of the universe. His model of epicycles and eccentrics was three dimensional and spherical. This was consistent with the Aristotelian and Ptolemaic models which were popular in Paris during the 1600s. In Paris during the 1640s and 1650s, the Tychonic system became popular and thus the universe became a three heaven model. This consisted of the planetary heaven being liquid and permeable, the solid firmament (or sphere of fixed stars), and lastly the Empyrean.

Jacques du Chevreul produced a unique take on astronomy by maintaining the most traditional Aristotelian astronomy possible while formally rejecting the Tychonic system. He also integrated and adjusted for the observations being made during the time, particularly from Galileo. He incorporated the moons of Jupiter and Saturn, the phases of Venus and Mercury, and sunspots into his system while keeping epicycles and eccentrics. While he rejected the Copernican system due to its contradiction to both physics and the Scriptures, he did not reject the arrangement of the Earth and the Moon around the Sun as it was like a terrestrial orb with the Moon contained similarly to an epicycle with the four elements.
