= Variation (astronomy) =

In astronomy, the variation of the Moon is one of the principal perturbations in the motion of the Moon.

== Discovery ==
The variation was discovered by Tycho Brahe, who noticed that, starting from a lunar eclipse in December 1590, at the times of syzygy (new or full moon), the apparent velocity of motion of the Moon (along its orbit as seen against the background of stars) was faster than expected. On the other hand, at the times of first and last quarter, its velocity was correspondingly slower than expected. (Those expectations were based on the lunar tables widely used up to Tycho's time. They took some account of the two largest irregularities in the Moon's motion, i.e. those now known as the equation of the center and the evection, see also Lunar theory - History.)

== Variation ==
The main visible effect (in longitude) of the variation of the Moon is that during the course of every month, at the octants of the Moon's phase that follow the syzygies (i.e. halfway between the new or the full moon and the next-following quarter), the Moon is about two thirds of a degree farther ahead than would be expected on the basis of its mean motion (as modified by the equation of the centre and by the evection). But at the octants that precede the syzygies, it is about two thirds of a degree behind. At the syzygies and quarters themselves, the main effect is on the Moon's velocity rather than its position.

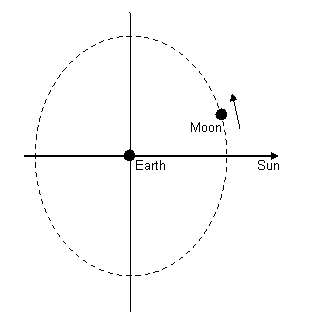
Variational orbit: nearly an ellipse, with the Earth at the center. The diagram illustrates the perturbing effect of the Sun on the Moon's orbit, using some simplifying approximations, e.g. that in the absence of the Sun, the Moon's orbit would be circular with the Earth at its center

In 1687 Newton published, in the 'Principia', his first steps in the gravitational analysis of the motion of three mutually-attracting bodies. This included a proof that the Variation is one of the results of the perturbation of the motion of the Moon caused by the action of the Sun, and that one of the effects is to distort the Moon's orbit in a practically elliptical manner (ignoring at this point the eccentricity of the Moon's orbit), with the centre of the ellipse occupied by the Earth, and the major axis perpendicular to a line drawn between the Earth and Sun.

The Variation has a period of half a synodic month and causes the Moon's ecliptic longitude to vary by nearly two-thirds of a degree, more exactly by +2370"sin(2D) where D is the mean elongation of the Moon from the Sun.

The variational distortion of the Moon's orbit is a different effect from the eccentric elliptical motion of a body in an unperturbed orbit. The Variation effect would still occur if the undisturbed motion of the Moon had an eccentricity of zero (i.e. circular). The eccentric Keplerian ellipse is another and separate approximation for the Moon's orbit, different from the approximation represented by the (central) variational ellipse. The Moon's line of apses, i.e. the long axis of the Moon's orbit when approximated as an eccentric ellipse, rotates once in about nine years, so that it can be oriented at any angle whatever relative to the direction of the Sun at any season. (The angular difference between these two directions used to be referred to, in much older literature, as the "annual argument of the Moon's apogee".) Twice in every period of just over a year, the direction of the Sun coincides with the direction of the long axis of the eccentric elliptical approximation of the Moon's orbit (as projected on to the ecliptic).

== Elliptical distortion ==
Thus the (central) elliptical distortion of the Moon's orbit caused by the variation should not be confused with an undisturbed eccentric elliptical motion of an orbiting body. The variational effects due to the Sun would still occur even if the hypothetical undisturbed motion of the Moon had an eccentricity of zero (i.e. even if the orbit would be circular in the absence of the Sun).

Newton expressed an approximate recognition that the real orbit of the Moon is not exactly an eccentric Keplerian ellipse, nor exactly a central ellipse due to the variation, but "an oval of another kind". Newton did not give an explicit expression for the form of this "oval of another kind"; to an approximation, it combines the two effects of the central-elliptical variational orbit and the Keplerian eccentric ellipse. Their combination also continually changes its shape as the annual argument changes, and also as the evection shows itself in libratory changes in the eccentricity, and in the direction, of the long axis of the eccentric ellipse.

The Variation is the second-largest solar perturbation of the Moon's orbit after the Evection, and the third-largest inequality in the motion of the Moon altogether; (the first and largest of the lunar inequalities is the equation of the centre, a result of the eccentricity – which is not an effect of solar perturbation).

== See also ==
- Evection

== Bibliography ==
- Brown, E.W. An Introductory Treatise on the Lunar Theory. Cambridge University Press, 1896 (republished by Dover, 1960).
