= Tycho Brahe =

Danish astronomer (1546–1601)

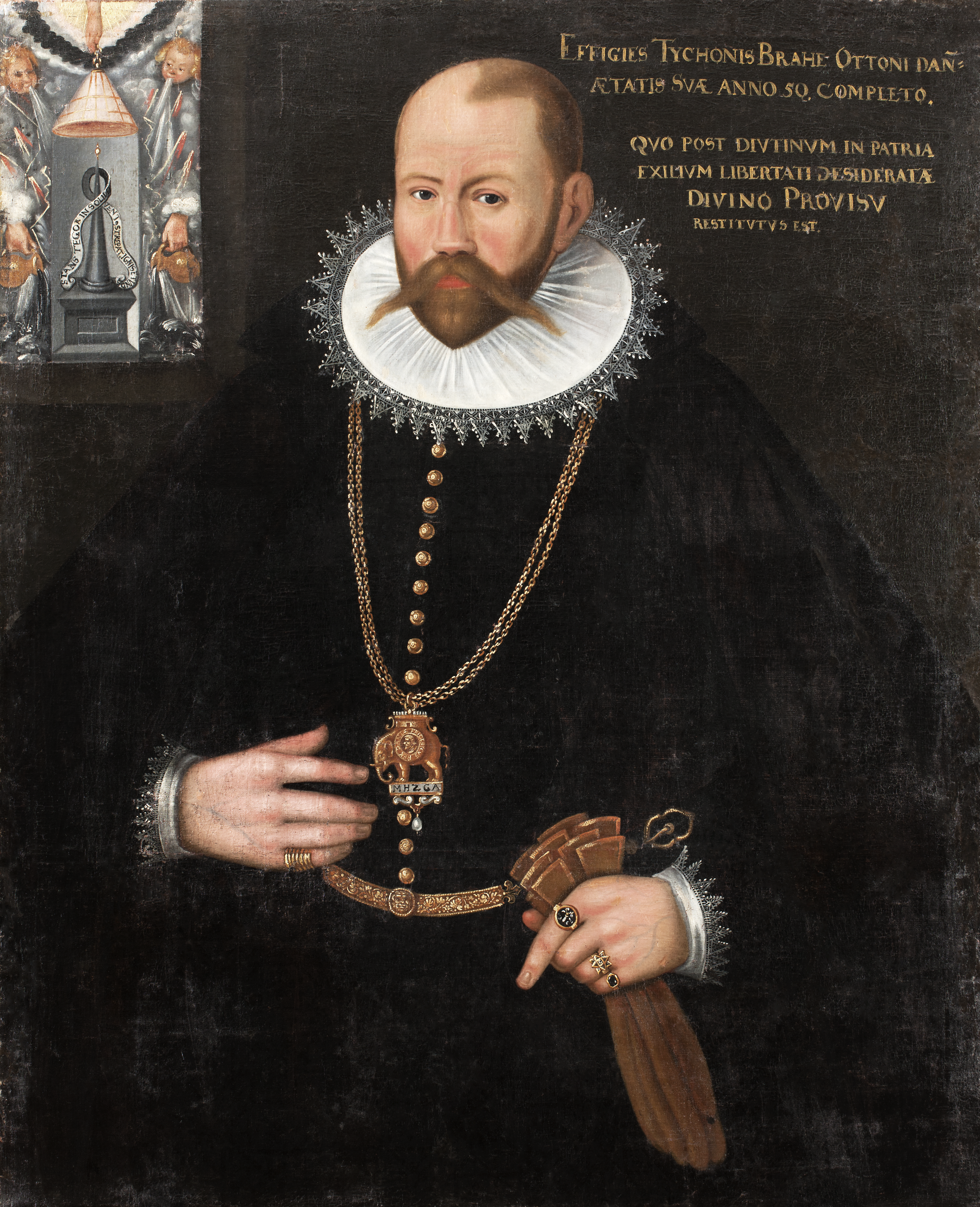
- Portrait, c. 1596
- Born: Tyge Ottesen Brahe; 14 December 1546; Knutstorp Castle, Scania, Denmark–Norway
- Died: 24 October 1601 (aged 54); Prague, Kingdom of Bohemia
- Education: University of Copenhagen; Leipzig University; University of Rostock
- Occupations: Astronomer; writer
- Known for: Tychonic system; Tycho's supernova; Rudolphine Tables; Variation
- Spouse: Kirsten Barbara Jørgensdatter
- Children: 8
- Parents: Otte Brahe; Beate Clausdatter Bille

Tycho Brahe (/ˈtaɪkoʊ ˈbrɑː(h)i, - ˈbrɑː(hə)/ TY-koh BRAH-(h)ee, - BRAH(-hə); Danish: [ˈtsʰykʰo ˈpʁɑːə]; born Tyge Ottesen Brahe, Danish: [ˈtsʰyːjə ˈʌtəsn̩ ˈpʁɑːə]; (Note: He adopted the Latinized form "Tycho Brahe" (sometimes written Tÿcho) about the age of 15. The name Tycho is the Latinized form of the Greek name Τύχων Tychōn and comes from Tyche (Τύχη, meaning "luck" in Greek; Roman equivalent, Fortuna), a tutelary deity of fortune and prosperity of Ancient Greek city cults. He is now generally called Tycho, as was common in Scandinavia in his time, rather than Brahe (a spurious appellative form of his name, Tycho de Brahe, arose only much later).) 14 December 1546 – 24 October 1601), generally called Tycho for short, was a Danish astronomer known for his comprehensive and unprecedentedly accurate astronomical observations which helped to turn astronomy into the first modern science and launch the Scientific Revolution. He was known during his lifetime as an astronomer, astrologer, and alchemist. He was the last major astronomer before the invention of the telescope and has been described as the greatest pre-telescopic astronomer.

In 1572, Tycho noticed a completely new star (now designated SN 1572) that was brighter than any star or planet. Astonished by the existence of a star that ought not to have been there, he devoted himself to the creation of ever more accurate instruments of measurement over the next fifteen years (1576–1591). King Frederick II granted Tycho an estate on the island of Hven and the money to build Uraniborg, the first large observatory in Christian Europe. He later worked underground at Stjerneborg, where he realised that his instruments in Uraniborg were not sufficiently steady.

An heir to several noble families, Tycho was well educated. He worked to combine what he saw as the geometrical benefits of Copernican heliocentrism with the philosophical benefits of the Ptolemaic system, and devised the Tychonic system, his own version of a model of the Universe, with the Sun orbiting the Earth, and the planets as orbiting the Sun. In De nova stella (1573), he refuted the Aristotelian belief in an unchanging celestial realm. His measurements indicated that "new stars", stellae novae, now called supernovae, moved beyond the Moon, and he was able to show that comets were not atmospheric phenomena, as was previously thought.

In 1597, Tycho was forced by the new king, Christian IV, to leave Denmark. He was invited to Prague, where he became the official imperial astronomer, and built an observatory at Benátky nad Jizerou. Before his death in 1601, he was assisted for a year by Johannes Kepler, who went on to use Tycho's data to develop his own three laws of planetary motion.

== Life ==
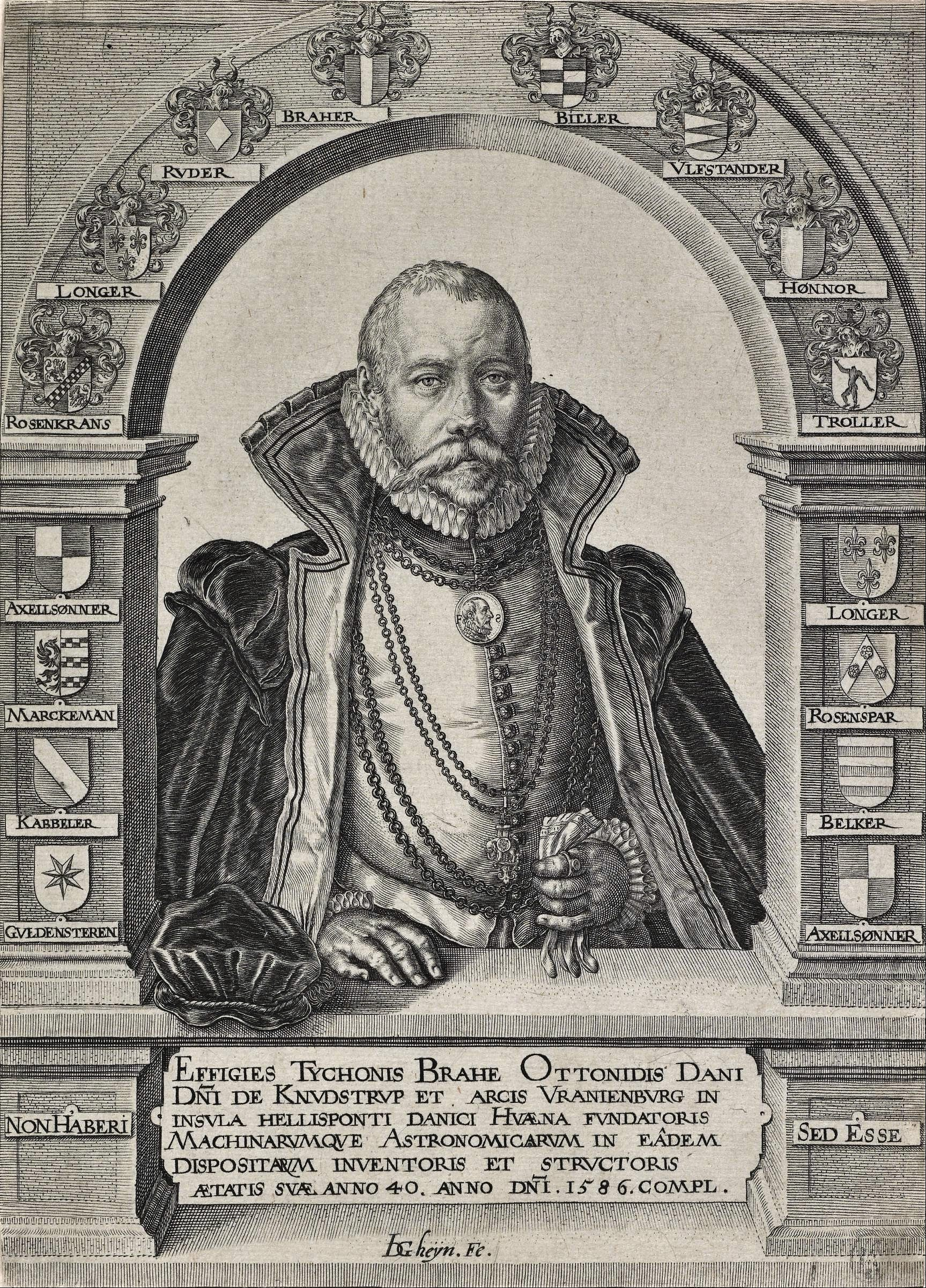
Jacques de Gheyn: Tycho Brahe framed by the family shields of his noble ancestors, 1586

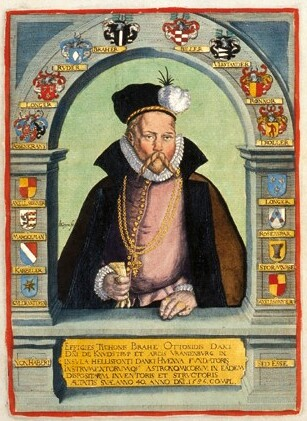
Tycho Brahe: Stellarum octavi orbis inerrantium accurata restitutio, 1598. Author's portrait in this book.

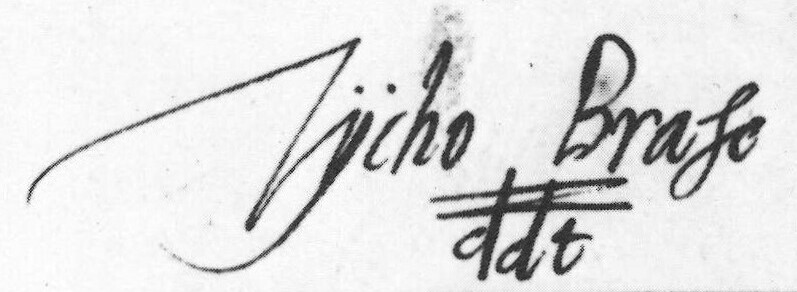
Signature on a book dedication to Josephus Scaliger, around 1598

=== Family ===
Tycho Brahe was born as heir to several of Denmark's most influential noble families. In addition to his immediate ancestry with the Brahe and the Bille families, he counted the Rud, Trolle, Ulfstand, and Rosenkrantz families among his ancestors. Both of his grandfathers and all of his great-grandfathers had served as members of the Danish king's Privy Council. His paternal grandfather and namesake, Thyge Brahe, was the lord of Tosterup Castle in Scania and died in battle during the 1523 Siege of Malmö during the Lutheran Reformation Wars.

His maternal grandfather, Claus Bille, lord to Bohus Castle and a second cousin of Swedish king Gustav Vasa, participated in the Stockholm Bloodbath on the side of the Kalmar Union king against the Swedish nobles. Tycho's father, Otte Brahe, a royal Privy Councilor (like his own father), married Beate Bille, a powerful figure at the Danish court holding several royal land titles. Tycho's parents are buried under the floor of the church of Kågeröd, four kilometres west of Knutstorp Castle.

=== Early years ===
Tycho was born on 14 December 1546, at his family's ancestral seat at Knutstorp (Knudstrup borg; Knutstorps borg), about 8 kilometres (5.0 mi) north of Svalöv in then Danish Scania (Swedish since 1658). He was the oldest of 12 siblings, 8 of whom lived to adulthood, including Steen Brahe and Sophia Brahe. His twin brother died before being baptized. Tycho later wrote an ode in Latin to his dead twin, which was printed in 1572 as his first published work. An epitaph, originally from Knutstorp, but now on a plaque near the church door, shows the whole family, including Tycho as a boy.

When he was only two years old Tycho was taken away to be raised by his uncle Jørgen Thygesen Brahe and his wife Inger Oxe, sister to Peder Oxe, Steward of the Realm, who were childless. It is unclear why Otte Brahe reached this arrangement with his brother, but Tycho was the only one of his siblings not to be raised by his mother at Knutstorp. Instead, Tycho was raised at Jørgen Brahe's estate at Tosterup and at Tranekær on the island of Langeland, and later at Næsbyhoved Castle near Odense, and later again at the Castle of Nykøbing on the island of Falster. Tycho later wrote that Jørgen Brahe "raised me and generously provided for me during his life until my eighteenth year; he always treated me as his own son and made me his heir".

From ages 6 to 12, Tycho attended Latin school, probably in Nykøbing. At age 12, on 19 April 1559, Tycho began studies at the University of Copenhagen. There, following his uncle's wishes, he studied law, but also studied a variety of other subjects and became interested in astronomy. At the university, Aristotle was a staple of scientific theory, and Tycho likely received a thorough training in Aristotelian physics and cosmology. He experienced the solar eclipse of 21 August 1560, and was greatly impressed by the fact that it had been predicted, although the prediction based on current observational data was a day off. He realized that more accurate observations would be the key to making more exact predictions. He purchased an ephemeris and books on astronomy, including Johannes de Sacrobosco's De sphaera mundi, Petrus Apianus's Cosmographia seu descriptio totius orbis and Regiomontanus's De triangulis omnimodis.

Jørgen Thygesen Brahe, however, wanted Tycho to educate himself in order to become a civil servant, and sent him on a study tour of Europe in early 1562. Fifteen-year-old Tycho was given as mentee to the 19-year-old Anders Sørensen Vedel. Tycho eventually talked Vedel into allowing him to pursue astronomy during the tour. Vedel and his pupil left Copenhagen in February 1562. On 24 March, they arrived in Leipzig, where they matriculated at the Lutheran Leipzig University. In 1563, he observed a close conjunction of the planets Jupiter and Saturn, and noticed that the Copernican and Ptolemaic tables used to predict the conjunction were inaccurate. This led him to realise that progress in astronomy required systematic, rigorous observation, night after night, using the most accurate instruments obtainable. He began maintaining detailed journals of all his astronomical observations. In this period, he combined the study of astronomy with astrology, laying down horoscopes for different famous personalities.

When Tycho and Vedel returned from Leipzig in 1565, Denmark was at war with Sweden, and as vice-admiral of the Danish fleet, Jørgen Brahe had become a national hero for having participated in the sinking of the Swedish warship Mars during the First battle of Öland (1564). Shortly after Tycho's arrival in Denmark, Jørgen Brahe was defeated in the action of 4 June 1565, and shortly afterwards died of a fever. Stories have it that he contracted pneumonia after a night of drinking with the Danish King Frederick II when the king fell into the water in a Copenhagen canal and Brahe jumped in after him. Brahe's possessions passed on to his wife Inger Oxe, who considered Tycho with special fondness.

=== Tycho's nose ===
In 1566, Tycho left to study at the University of Rostock in what is now Germany. There he studied with professors of medicine at the university's famous medical school and became interested in medical alchemy and herbal medicine. On 29 December 1566 at the age of 20, Tycho lost part of his nose in a sword duel with a fellow Danish nobleman, his third cousin Manderup Parsberg. At an engagement party at the home of Professor Lucas Bachmeister on 10 December the two had drunkenly quarreled over who was the superior mathematician. On 29 December, the cousins resolved their feud with a duel in the dark. Though the two were later reconciled, in the duel Tycho lost the bridge of his nose and gained a broad scar across his forehead.

He received the best possible care at the university and wore a prosthetic nose for the rest of his life. It was kept in place with paste or glue and said to be made of silver and gold. In November 2012, Danish and Czech researchers reported that the prosthesis was actually made of brass after chemically analyzing a small bone sample from the nose from the body exhumed in 2010.

=== Science and life on Uraniborg ===
In April 1567, Tycho returned home from his travels, with a firm intention of becoming an astrologer. Although he had been expected to go into politics and the law, like most of his kinsmen, and although Denmark was still at war with Sweden, his family supported his decision to dedicate himself to the sciences. His father wanted him to take up law, but Tycho was allowed to travel to Rostock and then to Augsburg, where he built a great quadrant, then Basel, and Freiburg. In 1568, he was appointed a canon at Roskilde Cathedral in Denmark, a largely honorary position that allowed him to focus on his studies.

At the end of 1570, he was informed of his father's ill health, so he returned to Knutstorp Castle, where his father died on 9 May 1571. The war was over, and the Danish lords soon returned to prosperity. Soon, another uncle, Steen Bille, helped him build an observatory and alchemical laboratory at Herrevad Abbey, where Tycho was assisted by his keenest disciple, his younger sister Sophie Brahe. Tycho was acknowledged by King Frederick II, who proposed to him that an observatory be built to better study the night sky. After accepting this proposal, the location for the Uraniborg’s construction was set on an island called Hven, now Ven in the Sound not too far from Copenhagen, the earliest large observatory in Christian Europe.

Tycho Brahe was highly appreciated by King Frederick II, and he was accepted and supported by people of high social status. He was supported by the church. The support Tycho Brahe received from the king allowed him to continue his research and make significant contributions to the field of astronomy.

In the late 16th century, Tycho Brahe built an observatory called Uraniborg. It was built on the island of Hven located between the provinces of Zealand (Sjælland) and Scania (Skåne). The island was then an administrative part of Zealand. Later, after the Peace of Roskilde in 1658, Scania was conquered by the Swedes. In 1660, Hven became part of Sweden. In Tycho's time, it was all Denmark. He lived on Hven for approximately 21 years. He began to build Uraniborg in 1576 and moved there soon after. As Uraniborg was a significant and advanced observatory, it took years to complete.

Uraniborg was a place where Tycho Brahe could research and analyze his previous findings, as well as explore new discoveries. Tycho Brahe was an astronomer of the pre-telescope era. Using just his naked eye, he observed the planets, Moon, stars, and space and recorded everything he saw while completing a multitude of calculations daily. The location of Uraniborg was strategically chosen, with seclusion and support being the primary reasons for building on the island of Hven. Seclusion was essential for accurate observation, and gave Tycho Brahe a better way to focus on his work without worrying about interruptions from other people. Seclusion was also important for observation, as there was nothing interfering with time, light, or motion observations.

Tycho Brahe was a perfectionist, and by being secluded he had complete control over his research and was not limited by anyone else's restrictions, enabling him to develop innovative research. He could focus all of his energy on his work, without receiving any backlash or questioning from anyone. The seclusion gave him the freedom to pursue his research without limitations and paved the way for groundbreaking discoveries in the field of astronomy. Uraniborg was one of the most advanced observatories of its time, equipped with several astronomical instruments, including quadrant instruments, sextants, and astronomical clocks.

Tycho Brahe's observations and calculations at Uraniborg allowed him to develop more accurate Solar System models. He compiled the most extensive and accurate catalog of stellar positions up to that time. Tycho Brahe's observations and calculations at Uraniborg allowed him to lay the groundwork for astronomers in the future.

Despite the success Tycho Brahe had on Hven, he eventually left the island after a disagreement with the new king of Denmark, Christian IV. In 1597, Tycho Brahe moved to Prague, where he continued his work and was eventually appointed by Emperor Rudolf II in 1601 as imperial mathematician. However, Uraniborg remained a significant landmark in the history of astronomy.

==== Morganatic marriage to Kirsten Jørgensdatter ====
Towards the end of 1571, Tycho fell in love with Kirsten, daughter of Jørgen Hansen, the Lutheran minister in Knudstrup. As she was a commoner, Tycho never formally married her, since if he did he would lose his noble privileges. However, Danish law permitted a form of morganatic marriage in which a nobleman and a common woman could live together openly as husband and wife for three years, at which point their alliance became a legally binding marriage. However, each would maintain their social status, and any children they had together would be considered commoners, with no rights to titles, landholdings, coat of arms, or even their father's noble name.

While King Frederick respected Tycho's choice of wife, himself having been unable to marry the woman he loved, many of Tycho's family members were opposed, and many churchmen continued to hold the lack of a divinely sanctioned marriage against him. Kirsten Jørgensdatter gave birth to their first daughter, Kirstine, named after Tycho's late sister, on 12 October 1573. Kirstine died from the plague in 1576. Tycho wrote a heartfelt elegy for her tombstone. In 1574, they moved to Copenhagen where their daughter Magdalene was born. Later the family followed him into exile. Kirsten and Tycho lived together for almost thirty years until Tycho's death. Together, they had eight children, six of whom lived to adulthood.

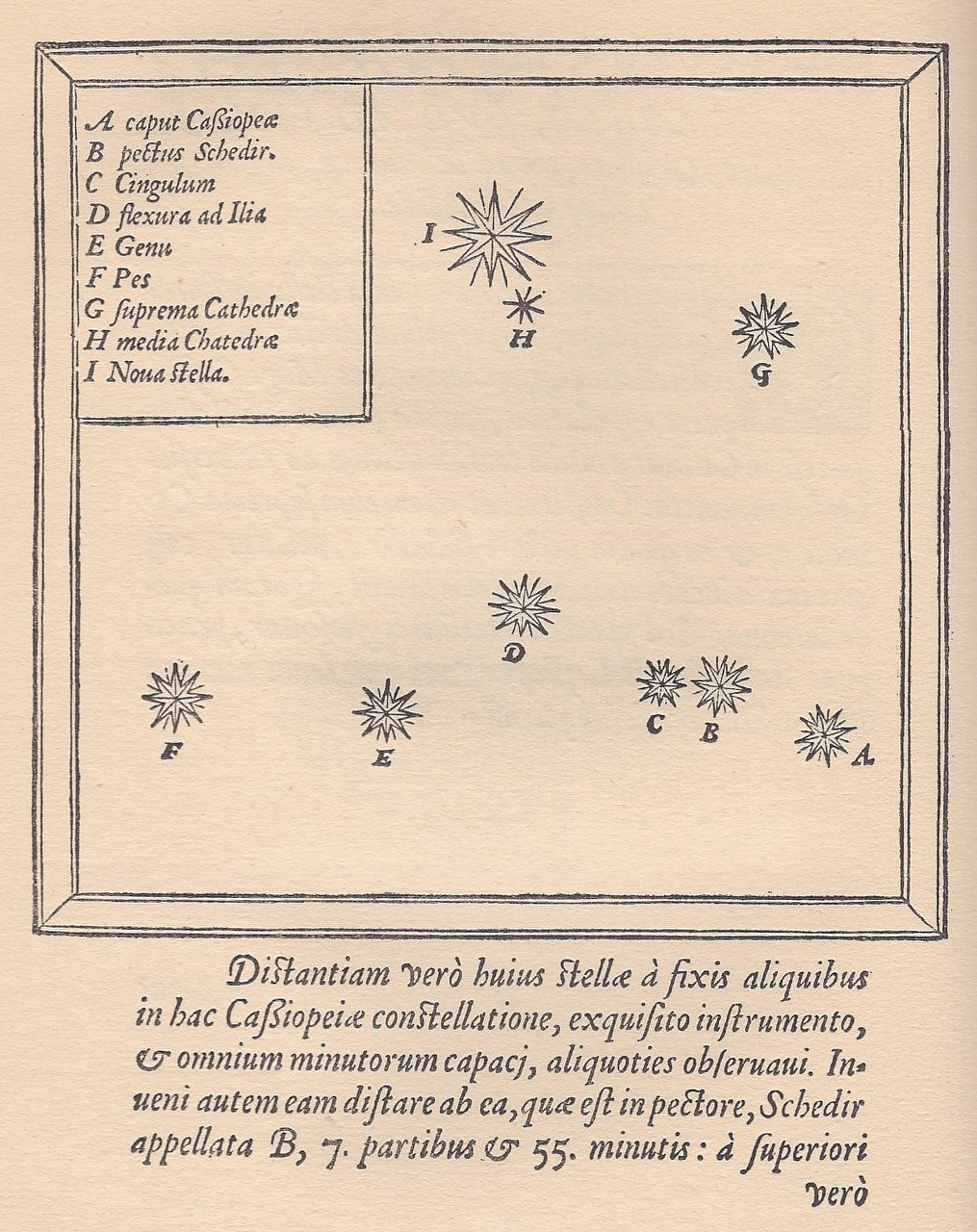
A star map of the constellation Cassiopeia showing the position of the supernova of 1572, the topmost star, labelled I, from Tycho Brahe's De nova stella

==== 1572 supernova ====
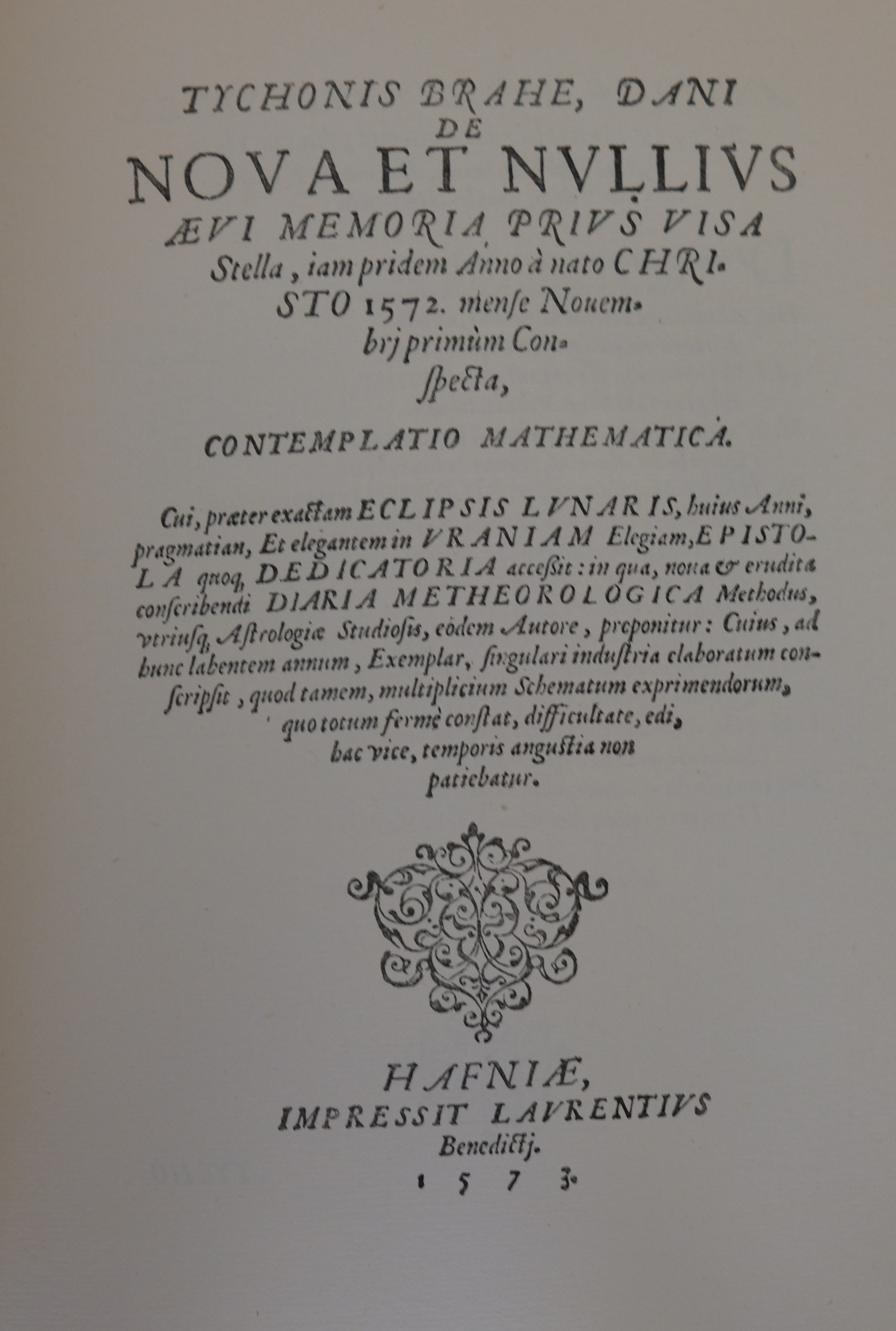
The title page to De nova stella, in a facsimile reprint of the original 1573 edition, 1901

On 11 November 1572, Tycho observed, from Herrevad Abbey, a very bright star, now numbered SN 1572, which had unexpectedly appeared in the constellation Cassiopeia. Because it had been maintained since antiquity that the world beyond the Moon's orbit was eternally unchangeable, with celestial immutability being a fundamental axiom of the Aristotelian world-view, other observers held that the phenomenon was something in the terrestrial sphere below the Moon. However, Tycho observed that the object showed no daily parallax against the background of the fixed stars. This implied that it was at least farther away than the Moon and those planets that do show such parallax. He found that the object did not change its position relative to the fixed stars over several months, as all planets did in their periodic orbital motions, even the outer planets, for which no daily parallax was detectable.

This suggested that it was not even a planet, but a fixed star in the stellar sphere beyond all the planets. In 1573, he published a small book De nova stella, coining the term nova for a "new" star. This star was a supernova and is 7,500 light-years from Earth. This discovery was decisive for his choice of astronomy as a profession. Tycho was strongly critical of those who dismissed the implications of the astronomical appearance, writing in the preface to De nova stella: "O crassa ingenia. O caecos coeli spectatores" ("O thick wits. O blind watchers of the sky"). The publication of his discovery made him a well-known name among scientists in Europe.

==== Lord of Hven ====
Tycho continued with his detailed observations, often assisted by his first assistant and student, his younger sister Sophie. In 1574, Tycho published the observations made in 1572 from his first observatory at Herrevad Abbey. He then started lecturing on astronomy, but gave it up and left Denmark in spring 1575 to tour abroad. He first visited William IV, Landgrave of Hesse-Kassel's observatory at Kassel, then went on to Frankfurt, Basel, and Venice, where he acted as an agent for the Danish king, contacting artisans and craftsmen whom the king wanted to work on his new palace at Elsinore. Upon his return, the King wished to repay Tycho's service by offering him a position worthy of his family. He offered him a choice of lordships of militarily and economically important estates, such as the castles of Hammershus or Helsingborg.

Tycho was reluctant to take up a position as a lord of the realm, preferring to focus on his science. He wrote to his friend Johannes Pratensis, "I did not want to take possession of any of the castles our benevolent king so graciously offered me. I am displeased with society here, customary forms and the whole rubbish". Tycho secretly began to plan to move to Basel, wishing to participate in the burgeoning academic and scientific life there. The King heard of Tycho's plans, and desiring to keep the distinguished scientist, in 1576 he offered Tycho the island of Hven in Øresund and funding to set up an observatory.

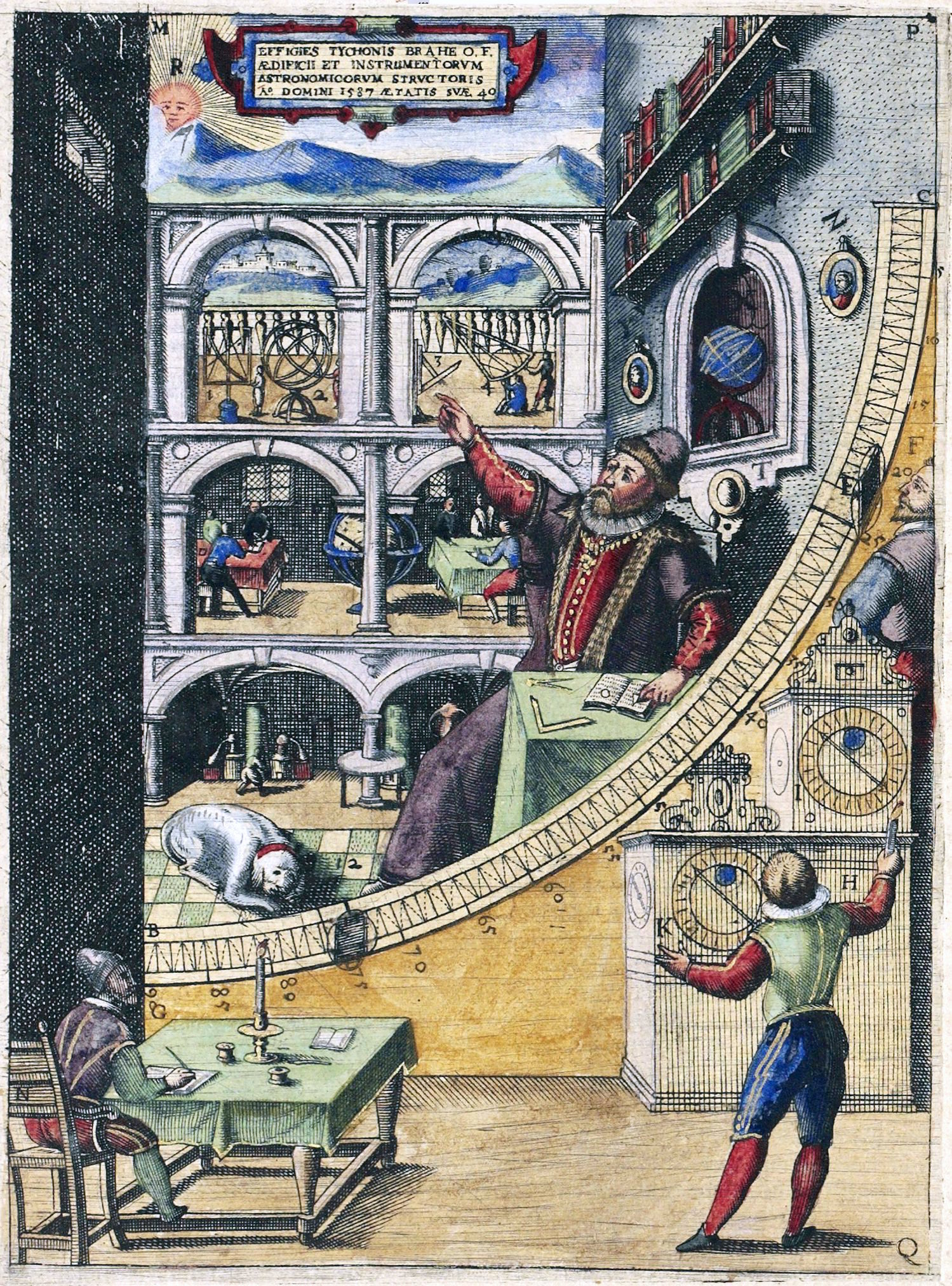
Tycho Brahe's large mural quadrant at Uraniborg

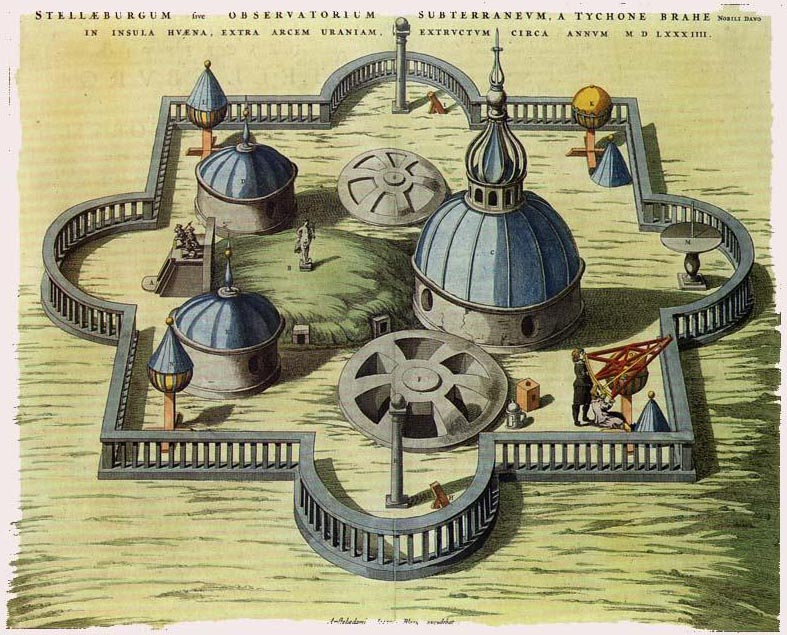
An engraving of the above ground parts of Tycho Brahe's underground observatory, Stjerneborg

Until then, Hven had been property directly under the Crown. The 50 families on the island considered themselves to be freeholding farmers, but with Tycho's appointment as Feudal Lord of Hven, this changed. Tycho took control of agricultural planning, requiring the peasants to cultivate twice as much as they had done before, and he exacted corvée labor from the peasants for the construction of his new castle. The peasants complained about Tycho's excessive taxation and took him to court. The court established Tycho's right to levy taxes and labor. The result was a contract detailing the mutual obligations of lord and peasants on the island.

Tycho envisioned his castle Uraniborg as a temple dedicated to the muses of arts and sciences, rather than as a military fortress. It was named after Urania, the muse of astronomy. Construction began in 1576, with a laboratory for his alchemical experiments in the cellar. Uraniborg was inspired by the Venetian architect Andrea Palladio. It was one of the first buildings in northern Europe to show influence from Italian renaissance architecture.

When he realized that the towers of Uraniborg were not adequate as observatories, because of the instruments' exposure to the elements and the movement of the building, he constructed an underground observatory close to Uraniborg called Stjerneborg (Star Castle) in 1584. This consisted of several hemispherical crypts which contained the great equatorial armillary, large azimuth quadrant, zodiacal armillary, largest azimuth quadrant of steel and the trigonal sextant.

The basement of Uraniborg included an alchemical laboratory, with 16 furnaces for conducting distillations and other chemical experiments. Unusually for the time, Tycho established Uraniborg as a research centre, where almost 100 students and artisans worked from 1576 to 1597. Uraniborg contained a printing press and a paper mill, both among the first in Scandinavia, enabling Tycho to publish his own manuscripts, on locally made paper with his own watermark. He created a system of ponds and canals to run the wheels of the paper mill. Another resident of Uraniborg was a man with dwarfism named Jeppe, whom Tycho believed had the ability to predict the future, and he allegedly was able to correctly predict the chances of recovery or death of ill people in Hven.

Over the years he worked on Uraniborg, Tycho was assisted by a number of students and protegés, many of whom went on to their own careers in astronomy. Among them were Christian Sørensen Longomontanus, later one of the main proponents of the Tychonic model and Tycho's replacement as royal Danish astronomer, Peder Flemløse, Elias Olsen Morsing, and Cort Aslakssøn. Tycho's instrument-maker Hans Crol formed part of the scientific community on the island.

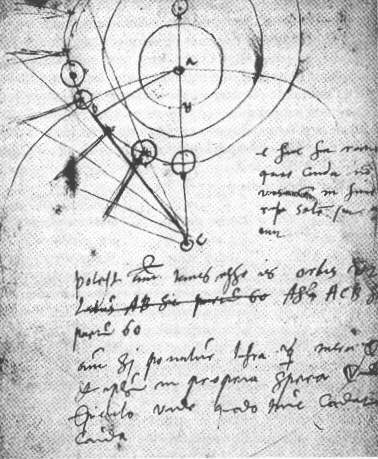
Brahe's notebook with his observations of the 1577 comet

==== Great Comet of 1577 ====
Tycho observed the Great Comet of 1577, which was visible in the Northern sky from November 1577 to January 1578. Within Lutheranism, it was commonly believed that celestial objects like comets were powerful portents, announcing the coming apocalypse. Several Danish amateur astronomers observed the object and published prophesies of impending doom. Tycho was able to determine that the comet's distance to Earth was much greater than the distance of the Moon, so that the comet could not have originated in the "earthly sphere", confirming his prior anti-Aristotelian conclusions about the fixed nature of the sky beyond the Moon.

Tycho realized that the comet's tail was always pointing away from the Sun. He calculated its diameter, mass, and the length of its tail, and speculated about the material it was made of. Through nightly observations of the comet, Tycho Brahe estimated its closest approach to Earth at about 230 times the Earth's radius. He also analyzed its motion, suggesting an orbit located between Mercury and Venus.

At this point, he had not yet broken with Copernican heliocentrism, and observing the comet inspired him to try to develop an alternative Copernican model, in which the Earth was immobile. Tycho Brahe's comet observations challenged the prevailing theory of solid celestial spheres. With the comet likely traveling between Mercury and Venus, the notion of these rigid spheres became untenable. It suggested a vast emptiness where objects like the comet, potentially quite large, could move freely and exhibit properties unlike those previously understood. The second half of his manuscript about the comet dealt with the astrological and apocalyptic aspects of the comet. Tycho rejected the prophesies of his competitors. Instead, he made his own predictions of dire political events in the near future. Among his predictions was bloodshed in Moscow, and the imminent fall of Ivan the Terrible by 1583. (Note: Ivan the Terrible died a year later than predicted by Tycho Brahe)

==== Support from the Crown ====
The support that Tycho received from the Crown was substantial, amounting to 1% of the annual total revenue at one point in the 1580s. Tycho often held large social gatherings in his castle. Pierre Gassendi wrote that Tycho had a tame elk and that his mentor the Landgrave Wilhelm of Hesse-Kassel asked whether there was an animal faster than a deer. Tycho replied that there was none, but he could send his tame elk. When Wilhelm replied he would accept one in exchange for a horse, Tycho replied with the sad news that the elk had just died on a visit to entertain a nobleman at Landskrona. Apparently, during dinner, the elk had drunk a lot of beer, fallen down the stairs, and died.

Among the many noble visitors to Hven was James VI of Scotland, who married the Danish princess Anne. He gave gold coins to the ferryman and to the builders and workers at Tycho's paper mill. After his visit to Hven in 1590, James wrote a poem comparing Tycho with Apollo and Phaethon.

As part of Tycho's duties to the Crown, in exchange for his estate, he fulfilled the functions of a royal astrologer. At the beginning of each year, he had to present an Almanac to the court, predicting the influence of the stars on the political and economic prospects of the year. At the birth of each prince, he prepared their horoscopes, predicting their fates. He also worked as a cartographer with his former tutor Anders Sørensen Vedel on mapping out all of the Danish realm. An ally of the king and friendly with Queen Sophie, both his mother Beate Bille and adoptive mother Inger Oxe had been her court maids, he secured a promise from the King that ownership of Hven and Uraniborg would pass to his heirs.

==== Publications, correspondence and scientific disputes ====
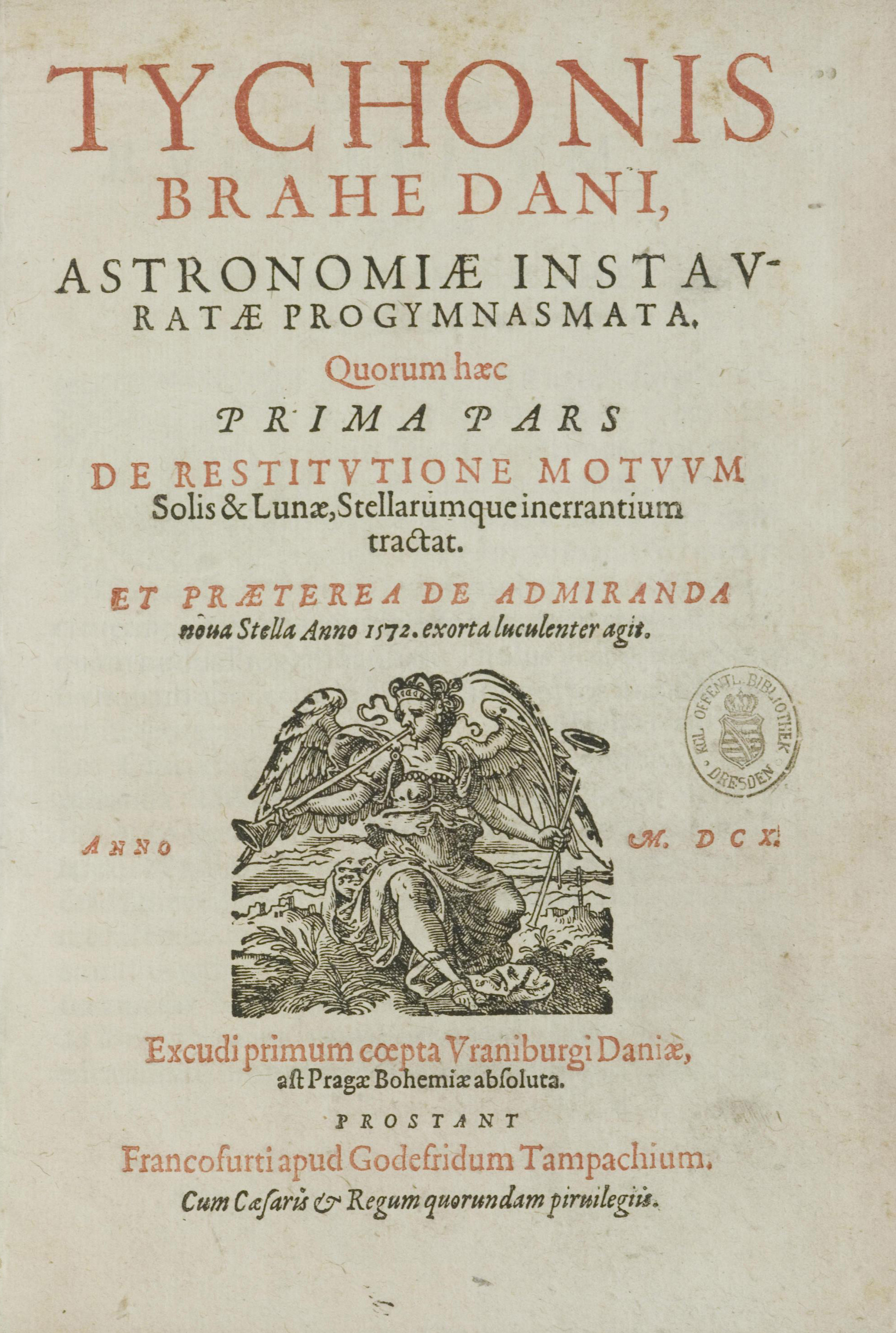
The frontispiece of the 1610 edition of Astronomiae Instauratae Progymnasmata

In 1588, Tycho's royal benefactor died, and a volume of Tycho's great two-volume work Astronomiae Instauratae Progymnasmata (Introduction to the New Astronomy) was published. The first volume, devoted to the new star of 1572, was not ready, because the reduction of the observations of 1572–73 involved much research to correct the stars' positions for refraction, precession, the motion of the Sun etc., and was not completed in Tycho's lifetime. It was published in Prague in 1602–1603.

The second volume, titled De Mundi Aetherei Recentioribus Phaenomenis Liber Secundus (Second Book About Recent Phenomena in the Celestial World) and devoted to the comet of 1577, was printed at Uraniborg and some copies were issued in 1588. Besides the comet observations, it included an account of Tycho's system of the world. The third volume was intended to treat the comets of 1580 and following years in a similar manner. It was never published, or written, though a great deal of material about the comet of 1585 was put together and published in 1845 with the observations of this comet.

While at Uraniborg, Tycho maintained correspondence with scientists and astronomers across Europe. He inquired about other astronomers' observations and shared his own technological advances to help them achieve more accurate observations. Thus, his correspondence was crucial to his research. Often, correspondence was not just private communication between scholars, but also a way to disseminate results and arguments and to build progress and scientific consensus. Through correspondence, Tycho was involved in several personal disputes with critics of his theories. Prominent among them were John Craig, a Scottish physician who was a strong believer in the authority of the Aristotelian worldview, and Nicolaus Reimers Baer, known as Ursus, an astronomer at the Imperial court in Prague, whom Tycho accused of having plagiarized his cosmological model.

Craig refused to accept Tycho's conclusion, that the comet of 1577 had to be located within the aetherial sphere, rather than within the atmosphere of Earth. Craig tried to contradict Tycho by using his own observations of the comet, and by questioning his methodology. Tycho published an apologia (a defense) of his conclusions, in which he provided additional arguments, as well as condemning Craig's ideas in strong language for being incompetent. Another dispute concerned the mathematician Paul Wittich, who, after staying on Hven in 1580, taught Count Wilhelm of Kassel and his astronomer Christoph Rothmann to build copies of Tycho's instruments without permission from Tycho. Craig, who had studied with Wittich, accused Tycho of minimizing Wittich's role in developing some of the trigonometric methods used by Tycho. In his dealings with these disputes, Tycho made sure to leverage his support in the scientific community, by publishing and disseminating his own answers and arguments.

=== Exile and later years ===
Denmark what is my offence?
How have I offended you, my fatherland?
You may think that what I have done is wrong
But was I wrong to spread your fame abroad?
Tell me, who has done such things before?
And sung your honour to the very stars?

— Excerpt of Tycho Brahe's Elegy to Dania

When Frederick died in 1588, his son and heir Christian IV was only 11 years old. A regency council was appointed to rule for the young prince-elect until his coronation in 1596. The head of the council (Steward of the Realm) was Christoffer Valkendorff, who disliked Tycho after a conflict between them, and hence Tycho's influence at the Danish court steadily declined. Feeling that his legacy on Hven was in peril, he approached the Dowager Queen Sophie and asked her to affirm in writing her late husband's promise to endow Hven to Tycho's heirs.

He realized that the young king was more interested in war than in science, and was of no mind to keep his father's promise. King Christian IV followed a policy of curbing the power of the nobility, by confiscating their estates to minimize their income bases, by accusing nobles of misusing their offices and of heresies against the Lutheran church. Tycho, who was known to sympathize with the Philippists, followers of Philip Melanchthon, was among the nobles who fell out of grace with the new king. The king's unfavorable disposition towards Tycho was likely also a result of efforts by several of his enemies at court to turn the king against him.

In addition to Valkendorff, Tycho's enemies included the king's doctor Peter Severinus, who also had personal gripes with Tycho. Several gnesio-Lutheran Bishops suspected Tycho of heresy – a suspicion motivated by his known Philippist sympathies, his pursuits in medicine and alchemy, both of which he practiced without the church's approval, and his prohibiting the local priest on Hven to include the exorcism in the baptismal ritual. Among the accusations raised against Tycho were his failure to adequately maintain the royal chapel at Roskilde, and his harshness and exploitation of the Hven peasantry.

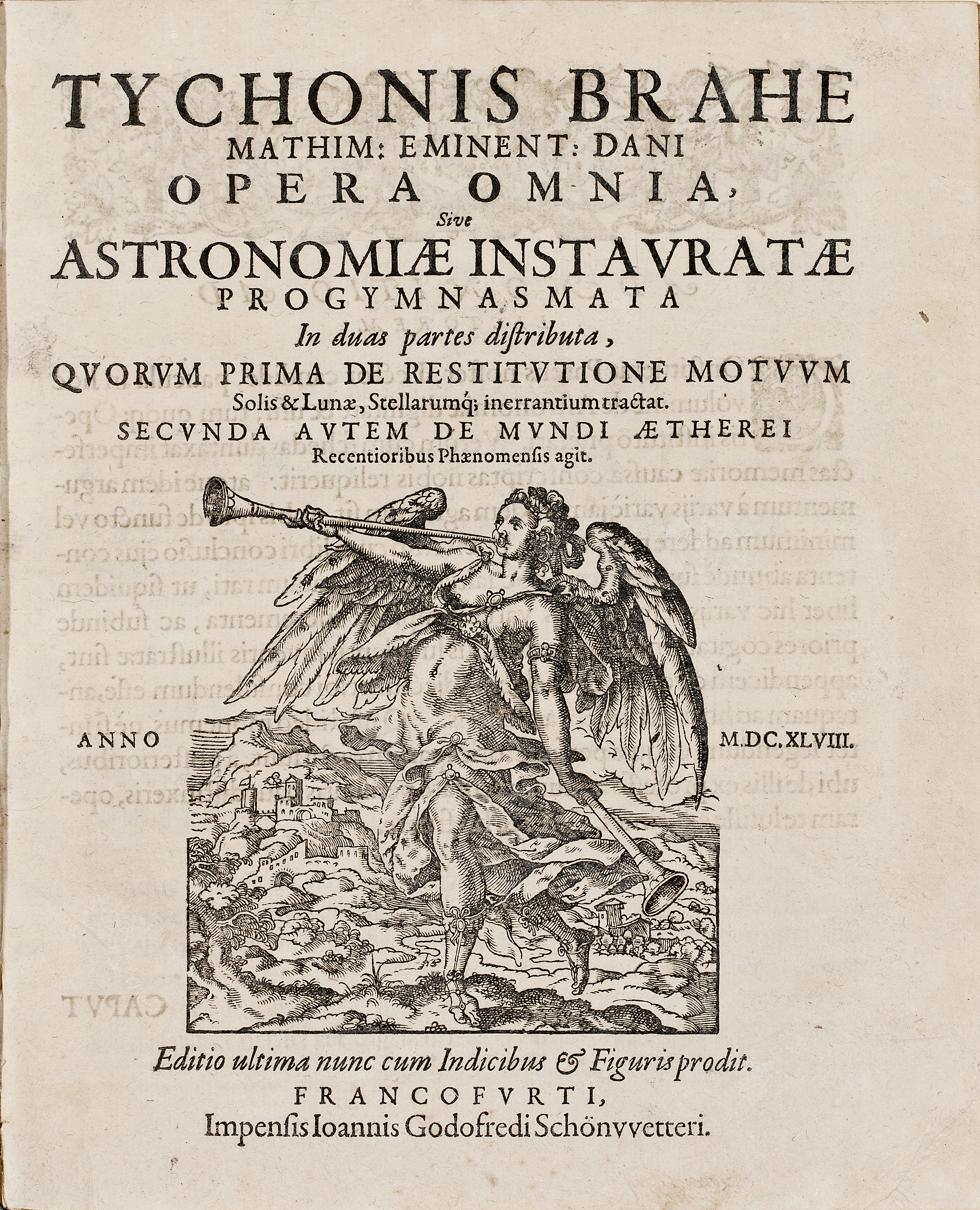
The title page of Astronomiae Instauratae, 1648 edition

Tycho became even more inclined to leave when a mob of commoners, possibly incited by his enemies at court, rioted in front of his house in Copenhagen. Tycho left Hven in 1597, bringing some of his instruments with him to Copenhagen, and entrusting others to a caretaker on the island. Shortly before leaving, he completed his star catalogue giving the positions of 1,000 stars. After some unsuccessful attempts at influencing the king to let him return, including showcasing his instruments on the wall of the city, he acquiesced to exile. He wrote his most famous poem, Elegy to Dania in which he chided Denmark for not appreciating his genius.

The instruments he had used in Uraniborg and Stjerneborg were depicted and described in detail in his star catalogue Astronomiae instauratae mechanica or Instruments for the restoration of astronomy, first published in 1598. The King sent two envoys to Hven to describe the instruments left behind by Tycho. Unversed in astronomy, the envoys reported to the king that the large mechanical contraptions such as his large quadrant and sextant were "useless and even harmful".

From 1597 to 1598, he spent a year at the castle of his friend Heinrich Rantzau at Haus Wandesburg in Wandsbek outside Hamburg. Then they moved for a while to Wittenberg, where they stayed in the former home of the Protestant reformer Philip Melanchthon.

In 1599, he obtained the patronage of Rudolf II, Holy Roman Emperor and moved to Prague, as Imperial Court Astronomer. Tycho built a new observatory in a castle in Benátky nad Jizerou, 50 km from Prague, and worked there for one year. The emperor then brought him back to Prague, where he stayed until his death. At the imperial court even Tycho's wife and children were treated like nobility, which they had never been at the Danish court.

Tycho received financial support from several nobles in addition to the emperor, including Oldrich Desiderius Pruskowsky von Pruskow, to whom he dedicated his famous Mechanica. In return for their support, Tycho's duties included preparing astrological charts and predictions for his patrons at events such as births, weather forecasting, and astrological interpretations of significant astronomical events, such as the supernova of 1572, sometimes called Tycho's supernova, and the Great Comet of 1577.

==== Relationship with Kepler ====
In Prague, Tycho worked closely with Kepler, his assistant. Kepler was a convinced Copernican, and considered Tycho's model to be mistaken, and derived from simple "inversion" of the Sun's and Earth's positions in the Copernican model. Together, the two worked on a new star catalogue based on his own accurate positions – this catalogue became the Rudolphine Tables. Also at the court in Prague was the mathematician Nicolaus Reimers (Ursus), with whom Tycho had previously corresponded, and who, like Tycho, had developed a geo-heliocentric planetary model, which Tycho considered to have been plagiarized from his own.

Kepler had previously spoken highly of Ursus, but now found himself in the problematic position of being employed by Tycho and having to defend his employer against Ursus' accusations, even though he disagreed with both of their planetary models. In 1600, he finished the tract Apologia pro Tychone contra Ursum (defense of Tycho against Ursus). Kepler had great respect for Tycho's methods and the accuracy of his observations and considered him to be the new Hipparchus, who would provide the foundation for a restoration of the science of astronomy.

=== Illness, death, and investigations ===
Tycho suddenly contracted a bladder or kidney ailment after attending a banquet in Prague. He died eleven days later, on 24 October 1601, at the age of 54. According to Kepler's first-hand account, Tycho had refused to leave the banquet to relieve himself because it would have been a breach of etiquette. After he returned home, he was no longer able to urinate, except eventually in very small quantities and with excruciating pain. The night before he died, he suffered from a delirium during which he was frequently heard to exclaim that he hoped he would not seem to have lived in vain.

Before dying, he urged Kepler to finish the Rudolphine Tables and expressed the hope that he would do so by adopting Tycho's own planetary system, rather than that of the polymath Nicolaus Copernicus. It was reported that Tycho had written his own epitaph, "He lived like a sage and died like a fool." A contemporary physician attributed his death to a kidney stone, but no kidney stones were found during an autopsy performed after his body was exhumed in 1901. Modern medical assessment is that his death was more likely caused by either a burst bladder, prostatic hypertrophy, acute prostatitis, or prostate cancer, which led to urinary retention, overflow incontinence, and uremia.

Investigations in the 1990s suggested that Tycho may not have died from urinary problems, but instead from mercury poisoning. It was speculated that he had been intentionally poisoned. The two main suspects were his assistant, Johannes Kepler, whose motives would be to gain access to Tycho's laboratory and chemicals, and his cousin, Erik Brahe, at the order of friend-turned-enemy Christian IV, because of rumors that Tycho had had an affair with Christian's mother.

In February 2010, the Prague city authorities approved a request by Danish scientists to exhume the remains, and in November 2010 a group of Czech and Danish scientists from Aarhus University collected bone, hair and clothing samples for analysis. The scientists, led by Jens Vellev, analyzed Tycho's beard hair once again. The team reported in November 2012 that there was not enough mercury present to substantiate murder, and there were no lethal levels of any poisons present. The team's conclusion was that "it is impossible that Tycho Brahe could have been murdered".

The findings were confirmed by scientists from the University of Rostock, who examined a sample of Tycho's beard hairs that had been taken in 1901. Although traces of mercury were found, these were present only in the outer scales. Therefore, mercury poisoning as the cause of death was ruled out. The study suggests that the accumulation of mercury may have come from the "precipitation of mercury dust from the air during [Tycho's] long-term alchemistic activities".

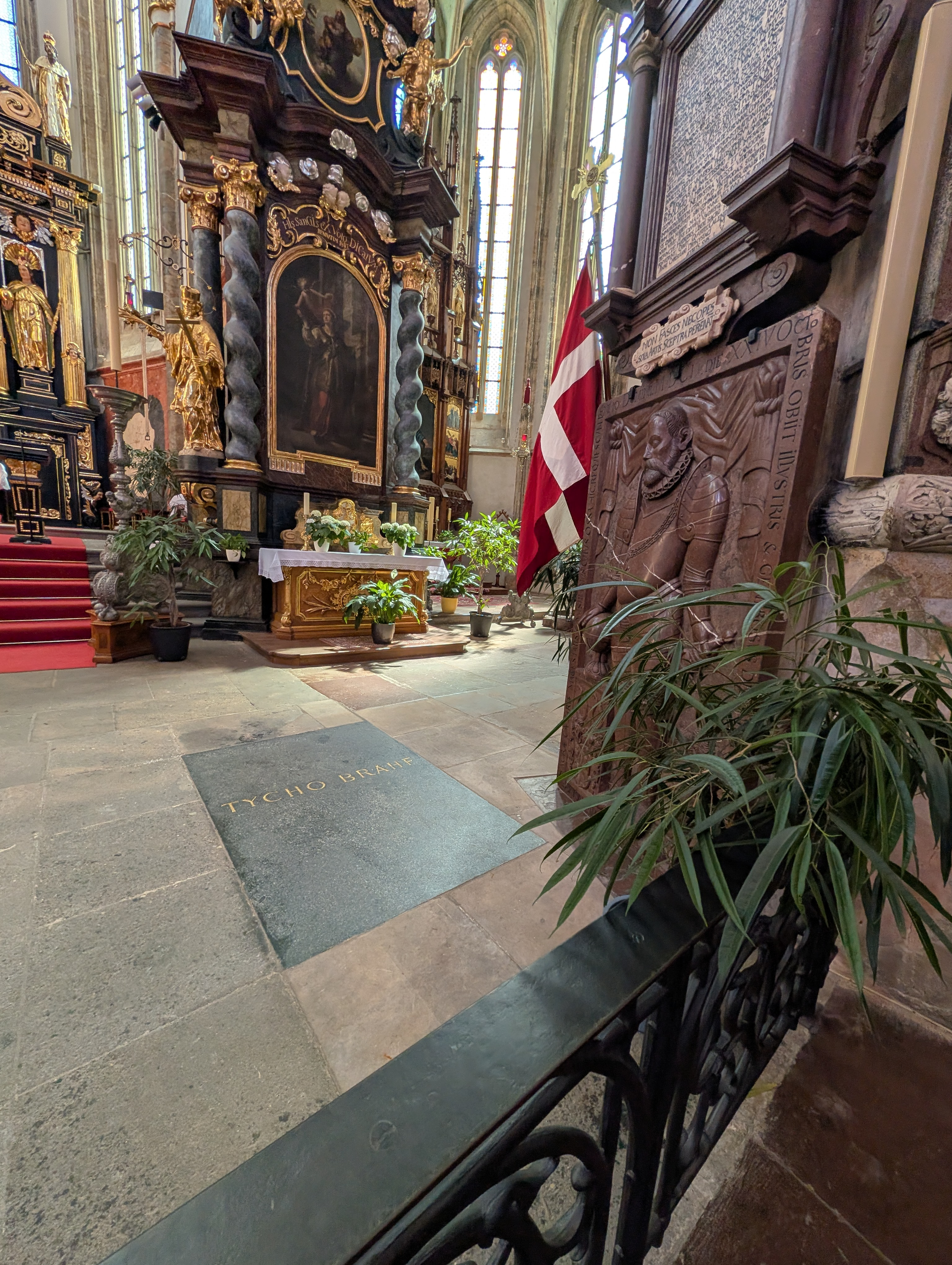
Tycho Brahe's Tomb in Týn Church

Tycho is buried in the Church of Our Lady before Týn, in Old Town Square near the Prague Astronomical Clock.

== Career: observing the heavens ==
=== Observational astronomy ===
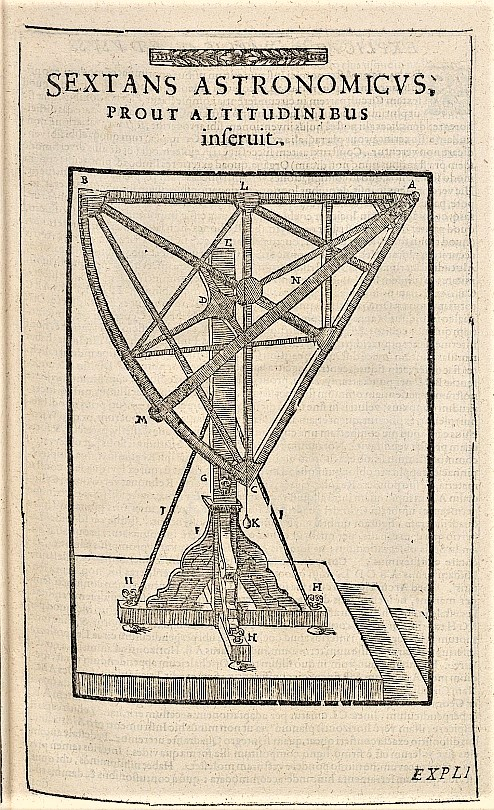
Brahe's illustration of his sextant, from his star catalogue Astronomiae instauratae mechanica, 1602

Tycho's view of science was driven by his passion for accurate observations, and the quest for improved instruments of measurement drove his life's work. Tycho was the last major astronomer to work without the aid of a telescope, soon to be turned skyward by Galileo Galilei and others. Given the limitations of the naked eye for making accurate observations, he devoted many of his efforts to improving the accuracy of the existing types of instrument – the sextant and the quadrant. He designed larger versions of these instruments, which allowed him to achieve much higher accuracy. Because of the accuracy of his instruments, he quickly realized the influence of wind and the movement of buildings, and instead opted to mount his instruments underground directly on the bedrock.

Tycho's observations of stellar and planetary positions were noteworthy both for their accuracy and quantity. With an accuracy approaching one arcminute, his celestial positions were much more accurate than those of any predecessor or contemporary – about five times as accurate as the observations of Wilhelm of Hesse. Rawlins (1993:§B2) asserts of Tycho's Star Catalog D, "In it, Tycho achieved, on a mass scale, a precision far beyond that of earlier catalogers. Cat D represents an unprecedented confluence of skills: instrumental, observational, and computational, all of which combined to enable Tycho to place most of his hundreds of recorded stars to an accuracy of ordermag 1'!"

He aspired to a level of accuracy in his estimated positions of celestial bodies of being consistently within an arcminute of their real celestial locations, and also claimed to have achieved this level. But, in fact, many of the stellar positions in his star catalogues were less accurate than that. The median errors for the stellar positions in his final published catalog were about 1.5', indicating that only half of the entries were more accurate than that, with an overall mean error in each coordinate of around 2'.

Although the stellar observations as recorded in his observational logs were more accurate, varying from 32.3" to 48.8" for different instruments, systematic errors of as much as 3' were introduced into some of the stellar positions Tycho published in his star catalog – due, for instance, to his application of an erroneous ancient value of parallax and his neglect of polestar refraction. Incorrect transcription in the final published star catalogue, by scribes in Tycho's employ, was the source of even larger errors, sometimes by many degrees. (Note: Victor Thoren says: "[the accuracy of the 777 star catalogue C] falls below the standards Tycho maintained for his other activities ... the catalogue left the best qualified appraiser of it (Tycho's eminent biographer J. L. E. Dreyer) manifestly disappointed. Some 6% of its final 777 positions have errors in one or both co-ordinates that can only have arisen from 'handling' problems of one kind or another. And while the brightest stars were generally placed with the minute-of-arc accuracy Tycho expected to achieve in every aspect of his work, the fainter stars (for which the slits on his sights had to be widened, and the sharpness of their alignment reduced) were considerably less well located." (ii) Michael Hoskin concurs with Thoren's finding "Yet although the places of the brightest of the non-reference stars [in the 777 star catalogue] are mostly correct to around the minute of arc that was his standard, the fainter stars are less accurately located, and there are many errors." (iii) The greatest max errors are given by Dennis Rawlins. They are in descending order a 238° scribal error in the right ascension of star D723; a 36° scribal error in the right ascension of D811; a 23° latitude error in all 188 southern stars by virtue of a scribal error; a 20° scribal error in longitude of D429; and a 13.5° error in the latitude of D811.)

Celestial objects observed near the horizon and above appear with a greater altitude than the real one, due to atmospheric refraction, and one of Tycho's most important innovations was that he worked out and published the very first tables for the systematic correction of this possible source of error. But, as advanced as they were, they attributed no refraction whatever above 45° altitude for solar refraction, and none for starlight above 20° altitude.

To perform the huge number of multiplications needed to produce much of his astronomical data, Tycho relied heavily on the then-new technique of prosthaphaeresis, an algorithm for approximating products based on trigonometric identities that predated logarithms.

=== Instruments ===
Many of Tycho's observations and discoveries were done with the aid of various instruments, many of which he himself made. The process that went into creating and refining his devices was haphazard at first, but was critical in the advancement of his observations. He pioneered an early example while he was a student in Leipzig. While he was gazing at the stars he realized that he needed a better way to write down not just his observations but also the angles and descriptions as well. So, he pioneered the use of the observational. In this notebook, he made his observations and asked himself questions to try to answer later on. Tycho also made sketches of what he saw as well from comets to the motions of planets.

His astronomical instrument innovation continued after his schooling. When he gained access to his inheritance, he went straight to work creating brand new instruments to replace the ones he used as a student. Tycho created a quadrant that was thirty-nine centimeters in diameter and added a new type of sight to it called a pinnacidia, or light cutters as it is translated. This brand-new sight meant that the old pinhole style sight was rendered obsolete. When the sights of the pinnacidia were aligned in the correct manner the object that it is lined up with will look exactly the same from both ends. This instrument was kept still on a heavy-duty base and adjusted via a brass plumb line and thumb screws, all of which helped give Tycho Brahe more accurate measurements of the heavens.

There were times that the instruments Tycho made were for a specific purpose or an event that he was witness to. Such was the case in 1577 when he first started construction of what would be called Uraniborg. In that year a comet was spotted moving across the sky. During this period of time Tycho made many observations, and one of the instruments that he used to make his observations was called a brass azimuthal quadrant. At sixty-five centimeters in radius it was a large instrument built either in 1576 or 1577, just in time for Tycho to use it to observe the path and distance of the 1577 comet. This instrument helped him to accurately track the comet's path as it crossed the orbits of the Solar System.

A great many more instruments were constructed at Tycho Brahe's new manor on Hven called Uraniborg. It was a combination of a home, observatories and laboratory where he made some of his discoveries along with many of his instruments. Several of these instruments were very large, such as a steel azimuth quadrant equipped with a brass arc that was six feet (or 194 centimeters) in diameter. This and other instruments were placed in the two observatories attached to the manor.

=== Tychonic cosmological model ===
The Tychonic system, surrounded by a sphere of fixed stars. The Moon and the Sun are shown orbiting the Earth, and five planets orbit the Sun.

Although Tycho admired Copernicus and was the first to teach his theory in Denmark, he was unable to reconcile Copernican theory with the basic laws of Aristotelian physics, which he believed to be foundational. He was critical of the observational data that Copernicus built his theory on, which he correctly considered to be inaccurate. Instead, Tycho proposed a "geo-heliocentric" system in which the Sun and Moon orbited the Earth, while the other planets orbited the Sun. His system had many of the observational and computational advantages of Copernicus' system. It provided a safe position for those astronomers who were dissatisfied with older models, but reluctant to accept heliocentrism.

It gained a following after 1616, when the Catholic Church declared the heliocentric model to be contrary to philosophy and Christian scripture, and only able to be discussed as a computational convenience. Tycho's system offered a major innovation in that it eliminated the idea of transparent rotating crystalline spheres to carry the planets in their orbits. Kepler and other Copernican astronomers, tried unsuccessfully to persuade Tycho to adopt the heliocentric model of the Solar System. To Tycho, the idea of a moving Earth was "in violation not only of all physical truth but also of the authority of Holy Scripture, which ought to be paramount."

Tycho held that the Earth was too sluggish and massive to be continuously in motion. According to the accepted Aristotelian physics of the time, the heavens, whose motions and cycles were continuous and unending, were made of aether, a substance not found on Earth, that caused objects to move in a circle. By contrast, objects on Earth seem to have motion only when moved, and the natural state of objects on its surface was rest. Tycho said the Earth was an inert body, not readily moved. He acknowledged that the rising and setting of the Sun and stars could be explained by a rotating Earth, as Copernicus had said, still:

such a fast motion could not belong to the earth, a body very heavy and dense and opaque, but rather belongs to the sky itself whose form and subtle and constant matter are better suited to a perpetual motion, however fast.

Tycho believed that, if the Earth did orbit the Sun, there should be an observable stellar parallax every six months (the stars' positions would change thanks to Earth's changing position). (Note: This parallax does exist, but is so small it was not detected until 1838, when Friedrich Bessel discovered a parallax of 0.314 arcseconds of the star 61 Cygni.) The lack of any stellar parallax was explained by the Copernican theory as being due to the stars' enormous distances from Earth. Tycho noted and attempted to measure the apparent relative sizes of the stars in the sky. He used geometry to show that the distance to the stars in the Copernican system would have to be 700 times greater than the distance from the Sun to Saturn and to be seen at these distances the stars would have to be gigantic, at least as big as the orbit of the Earth, and of course vastly larger than the Sun. Tycho said:

Deduce these things geometrically if you like, and you will see how many absurdities (not to mention others) accompany this assumption [of the motion of the earth] by inference.

Copernicans offered a religious response to Tycho's geometry: titanic, distant stars might seem unreasonable, but they were not, for the Creator could make his creations that large if He wanted. In fact, Rothmann responded to this argument of Tycho's by saying:

[W]hat is so absurd about [an average star] having size equal to the whole [orbit of the Earth]? What of this is contrary to divine will, or is impossible by divine Nature, or is inadmissible by infinite Nature? These things must be entirely demonstrated by you, if you will wish to infer from here anything of the absurd. These things that vulgar sorts see as absurd at first glance are not easily charged with absurdity, for in fact divine Sapience and Majesty is far greater than they understand. Grant the vastness of the Universe and the sizes of the stars to be as great as you like – these will still bear no proportion to the infinite Creator. It reckons that the greater the king, so much greater and larger the palace befitting his majesty. So how great a palace do you reckon is fitting to GOD?

Religion played a role in Tycho's geocentrism – he cited the authority of scripture in portraying the Earth as being at rest. He rarely used Biblical arguments alone. To him they were a secondary objection to the idea of Earth's motion, and over time he came to focus on scientific arguments, but he did take Biblical arguments seriously.

Tycho's 1587 geo-heliocentric model differed from those of other geo-heliocentric astronomers, such as Wittich, Reimarus Ursus, Helisaeus Roeslin and David Origanus, in that the orbits of Mars and the Sun intersected. This was because Tycho had come to believe the distance of Mars from the Earth at opposition (that is, when Mars is on the opposite side of the sky from the Sun) was less than that of the Sun from the Earth. Tycho believed this because he came to believe Mars had a greater daily parallax than the Sun. In 1584, in a letter to a fellow astronomer, Brucaeus, he had claimed that Mars had been further than the Sun at the opposition of 1582, because he had observed that Mars had little or no daily parallax. He said he had therefore rejected Copernicus's model because it predicted Mars would be at only two-thirds the distance of the Sun.

He apparently later changed his mind to the opinion that Mars at opposition was indeed nearer the Earth than the Sun was, but apparently without any valid observational evidence in any discernible Martian parallax. Such intersecting Martian and solar orbits meant that there could be no solid rotating celestial spheres, because they could not possibly interpenetrate. Arguably, this conclusion was independently supported by the conclusion that the comet of 1577 was superlunary, because it showed less daily parallax than the Moon and thus must pass through any celestial spheres in its transit. While Tycho Brahe and his contemporaries lacked a fully developed alternative to Aristotelian physics, Brahe's comet observations cast significant doubt on its validity.

=== Lunar theory ===
Tycho's distinctive contributions to lunar theory include his discovery of the variation of the Moon's longitude. This represents the largest inequality of longitude after the equation of the center and the evection. He also discovered librations in the inclination of the plane of the lunar orbit, relative to the ecliptic (which is not a constant of about 5° as had been believed before him, but fluctuates through a range of over a quarter of a degree), and accompanying oscillations in the longitude of the lunar node. These represent perturbations in the Moon's ecliptic latitude. Tycho's lunar theory doubled the number of distinct lunar inequalities, relative to those anciently known, and reduced the discrepancies of lunar theory to about a fifth of their previous amounts. It was published posthumously by Kepler in 1602, and Kepler's own derivative form appears in Kepler's Rudolphine Tables of 1627.

=== Subsequent developments in astronomy ===
Kepler used Tycho's records of the motion of Mars to deduce laws of planetary motion, enabling calculation of astronomical tables with unprecedented accuracy (the Rudolphine Tables) (Note: According to Owen Gingerich and Christopher Linton, these tables were some 30 times more accurate than other astronomical tables then available.) and providing powerful support for a heliocentric model of the Solar System.

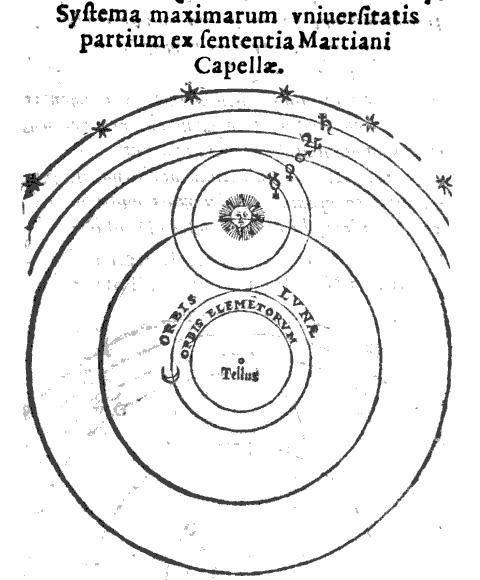
Valentin Naboth's drawing of Martianus Capella's geo-heliocentric astronomical model (1573)

Galileo's 1610 telescopic discovery that Venus shows a full set of phases refuted the pure geocentric Ptolemaic model. After that it seems 17th-century astronomy mostly converted to geo-heliocentric planetary models that could explain these phases just as well as the heliocentric model could, but without the latter's disadvantage of the failure to detect any annual stellar parallax that Tycho and others regarded as refuting it.

The three main geo-heliocentric models were the Tychonic, the Capellan with just Mercury and Venus orbiting the Sun such as favoured by Francis Bacon, for example, and the extended Capellan model of Riccioli with Mars also orbiting the Sun whilst Saturn and Jupiter orbit the fixed Earth. The Tychonic model was probably the most popular, albeit probably in what was known as 'the semi-Tychonic' version with a daily rotating Earth. This model was advocated by Tycho's ex-assistant and disciple Longomontanus, in his 1622 Astronomia Danica, that was the intended completion of Tycho's planetary model with his observational data, and which was regarded as the canonical statement of the complete Tychonic planetary system. Longomontanus' work was published in several editions and used by many subsequent astronomers. Through him, the Tychonic system was adopted by astronomers as far away as China.

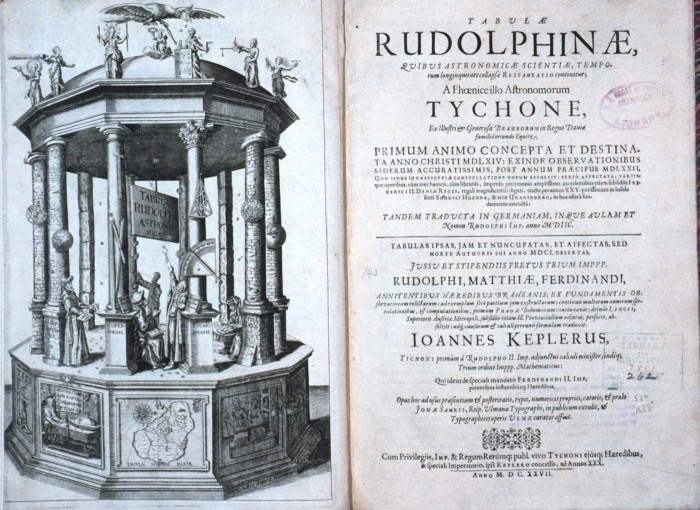
Johannes Kepler published the Rudolphine Tables containing a star catalog and planetary tables using Tycho's measurements. Hven island appears west uppermost on the base.

The ardent anti-heliocentric French astronomer Jean-Baptiste Morin devised a Tychonic planetary model with elliptical orbits published in 1650 in a simplified, Tychonic version of the Rudolphine Tables. Another geocentric French astronomer, Jacques du Chevreul, rejected Tycho's observations including his description of the heavens and the theory that Mars was below the Sun. Some acceptance of the Tychonic system persisted through the 17th century and in places until the early 18th century. It was supported after a 1633 decree about the Copernican controversy, by "a flood of pro-Tycho literature" of Jesuit origin. Among pro-Tycho Jesuits, Ignace Pardies declared in 1691 that it was still the commonly accepted system, and Francesco Blanchinus reiterated that as late as 1728.

Persistence of the Tychonic system, especially in Catholic countries, has been attributed to its satisfaction of a need, relative to Catholic doctrine, for "a safe synthesis of ancient and modern". After 1670, even many Jesuit writers only thinly disguised their Copernicanism. In Germany, the Netherlands, and England, the Tychonic system "vanished from the literature much earlier".

James Bradley's discovery of stellar aberration, published in 1729, eventually gave direct evidence excluding the possibility of all forms of geocentrism including Tycho's. Stellar aberration could only be satisfactorily explained on the basis that the Earth is in annual orbit around the Sun, with an orbital velocity that combines with the finite speed of the light coming from an observed star or planet, to affect the apparent direction of the body observed.

=== Work in medicine, alchemy and astrology ===
Tycho worked in medicine and alchemy. He was influenced by the Swiss physician Paracelsus, who considered the human body to be directly affected by celestial bodies. Tycho used Paracelsus's ideas to connect empiricism and natural science, and religion and astrology. Using his herbal garden at Uraniborg, Tycho produced recipes for herbal medicines, and used them to treat fever and plague. His herbal medicines were in use until the end of the 19th century.

The expression Tycho Brahe days referred to "unlucky days" that were featured in almanacs from the 1700s onwards, but which have no direct connection to Tycho or his work. Whether because Tycho realized that astrology was not an empirical science, or because he feared religious repercussions, he did not publicise his own astrological work. For example, two of his more astrological treatises, one on weather predictions and an almanac, were published in the names of his assistants, in spite of the fact that he worked on them personally. Some scholars have argued that he lost faith in horoscope astrology over the course of his career, and others that he simply changed his public communication on the topic as he realized that connections with astrology could influence the reception of his empirical astronomical work.

== Legacy ==
=== Biographies ===
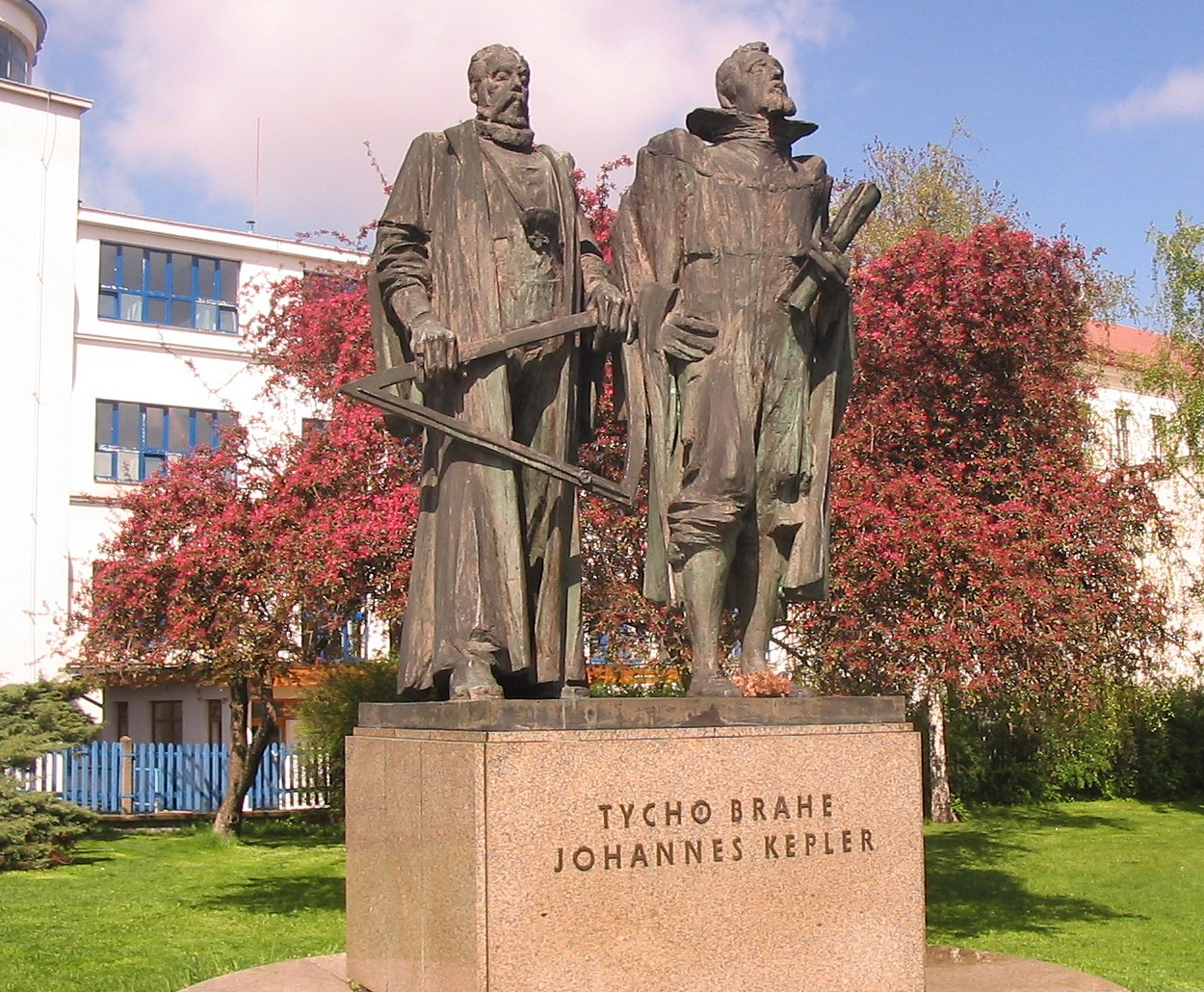
A monument to Tycho Brahe and Johannes Kepler in Prague, Czech Republic

The first biography of Tycho, which was also the first full-length biography of any scientist, was written by Gassendi in 1654. In 1779, Tycho de Hoffmann wrote of Tycho's life in his history of the Brahe family. In 1913, Johann Dreyer published Tycho's collected works, facilitating further research. Early modern scholarship on Tycho tended to see the shortcomings of his astronomical model, painting him as a mysticist reluctant to accept Copernicanism, and valuing mostly his observations that allowed Kepler to formulate his laws of planetary movement. Especially in Danish scholarship, Tycho was depicted as a mediocre scholar and a traitor to the nation – perhaps because of the important role in Danish historiography of Christian IV as a warrior king.

In the second half of the 20th century, scholars began reevaluating his significance, and studies by Kristian Peder Moesgaard, Owen Gingerich, Robert Westman, Victor E. Thoren, John R. Christianson and C. Doris Hellman focused on his contributions to science, and demonstrated that while he admired Copernicus he was simply unable to reconcile his basic theory of physics with the Copernican view. Christianson's work showed the influence of Tycho's Uraniborg as a training center for scientists who after studying with Tycho went on to make contributions in various scientific fields.

=== Scientific legacy ===
Although Tycho's planetary model was soon discredited, his astronomical observations were an essential contribution to the Scientific Revolution. The traditional view of Tycho is that he was primarily an empiricist who set new standards for precise and objective measurements. This appraisal originated in Gassendi's 1654 biography, Tychonis Brahe, equitis Dani, astronomorum coryphaei, vita. It was furthered by Dreyer's biography in 1890, which was long the most influential work on Tycho. According to historian of science Helge Kragh, this assessment grew out of Gassendi's opposition to Aristotelianism and Cartesianism, and fails to account for the diversity of Tycho's activities.

Tycho was the last major astronomer before the invention of the telescope and has been described as the greatest pre-telescopic astronomer.

The Tycho Brahe Prize, inaugurated in 2008, is awarded annually by the European Astronomical Society in recognition of the pioneering development or exploitation of European astronomical instrumentation, or major discoveries based largely on such instruments.

=== Cultural legacy ===
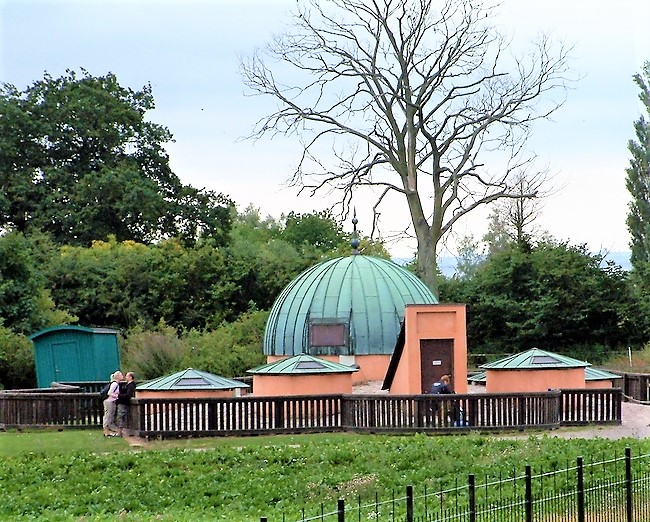
A modern reconstruction of Stjerneborg observatory in Hven Island, originally constructed in 1589, now a museum

Tycho's discovery of the new star was the inspiration for Edgar Allan Poe's poem "Al Aaraaf". In 1998, Sky & Telescope magazine published an article by Donald Olson, Marilynn S. Olson and Russell L. Doescher arguing, in part, that Tycho's supernova was also the same "star that's westward from the pole" in Shakespeare's Hamlet.

Tycho is directly referenced in Sarah Williams' poem The Old Astronomer: "Reach me down my Tycho Brahé, – I would know him when we meet". Though, the poem's oft quoted line comes later: "Though my soul may set in darkness, it will rise in perfect light; / I have loved the stars too truly to be fearful of the night."

Alfred Noyes in his Watchers of the Sky (the first part of The Torch-bearers of 1922) included a long biographical poem in honour of Brahe, elaborating on the known history in a highly romantic and imaginative way.

The lunar crater Tycho is named in his honour, as is the crater Tycho Brahe on Mars and the minor planet 1677 Tycho Brahe in the asteroid belt. The bright supernova, SN 1572, is also known as Tycho's Nova and the Tycho Brahe Planetarium in Copenhagen is also named after him, as is the palm genus Brahea. In 2015, the planet Brahe was named after him as part of the NameExoWorlds campaign.

Brahe Rock in Antarctica is named after Tycho Brahe.

In The Expanse (novel series) and The Expanse (TV series) "Tycho" is the name of a company known for its large-scale building projects all around the Solar System. The company has their own space station named "Tycho Station".

In the 1996 video game Descent II, the players' 7th destination planet is named Tycho Brahe.

Author Jerry Holkins' comic alter ego and online handle for Penny Arcade is named after the astronomer Tycho Brahe.

== Works (selection) ==
- Tychonis Brahe Astronomiae Instauratae Progymnasmata (Introduction to the New Astronomy) (Prague, 1602/03; Frankfurt, 1610)
- De Mundi Aetherei Recentioribus Phaenomenis Liber Secundus (Second Book About Recent Phenomena in the Celestial World) (Uraniborg, 1588; Prague, 1603; Frankfurt, 1610)
- [Opere. Carteggi] (in Latin). København: G.E.C. Gad. 1876–1886.

== See also ==
- Supernova of 1572 ("Tycho's Supernova")
- December 1573 lunar eclipse
- Great Comet of 1577
- History of trigonometry
- List of astronomers

== Sources ==
- Almási, Gábor (2013). "Tycho Brahe and the separation of astronomy from astrology: the making of a new scientific discourse". Science in Context. 26 (1): 3–30. doi:10.1017/s0269889712000270. S2CID 121696611.
- Barker, P. (2020). 3013TychoBrahe. HSTM3013.
- Benecke, Mark (2004). "The Search for Tycho Brahe's Nose" (PDF). Annals of Improbable Research. 10 (4): 6–7. doi:10.3142/107951404781540572.
- Björklund, Per-Åke (1992). Tycho Brahe og kamarillaen: festskrift i anledning af 400-års dagen for Christian IV's besøg på Hven [Tycho Brahe and the Camarilla] (in Danish). Copenhagen: Rhodos. ISBN 978-87724-5-470-2.
- Blair, Ann (1990). "Tycho Brahe's critique of Copernicus and the Copernican system". Journal of the History of Ideas (Submitted manuscript). 51 (3): 355–377. doi:10.2307/2709620. JSTOR 2709620. S2CID 21885864.
- Boerst, William J. (2003). Tycho Brahe: Mapping the Heavens. Greensboro, NC: Morgan Reynolds Publishing. ISBN 978-18838-4-697-8.
- Bricka, Carl Frederik (1888). "Tycho Brahe". Dansk Biografisk Lexikon. Vol. II. Beccau – Brandis.
- Christianson, John Robert (1979). "Tycho Brahe's German treatise on the comet of 1577: A study in science and politics". Isis. 70: 110–140. Bibcode:1979Isis...70..110C. doi:10.1086/352158. S2CID 144502304.
- Christianson, John Robert (1998). "Tycho Brahe in Scandinavian Scholarship". History of Science. 36 (4): 467–484. doi:10.1177/007327539803600403. S2CID 161128058.
- Christianson, John Robert (2000). On Tycho's Island: Tycho Brahe and His Assistants, 1570–1601. Cambridge: Cambridge University Press. ISBN 978-05210-0-884-6.
- Christianson, John Robert (2002). "The Legacy of Tycho Brahe". Centaurus. 44 (3–4): 228–247. doi:10.1034/j.1600-0498.2002.440302.x. PMID 17424666.
- Christianson, John Robert (2017). "Tycho Brahe's Earliest Instruments" (PDF). Nordic Journal of Renaissance Studies (Renæssanceforum). 12. Nordic Network for Renaissance Studies: 131–1444. ISSN 2597-0143.
- Christianson, John Robert (2020). Tycho Brahe and the Measure of the Heavens. London: Reaktion Books Ltd. ISBN 978-17891-4-271-6.
- Christianson, J. R. (2020). "Star Castle: Going Down to See Up". In Tycho Brahe and the measure of the heavens (pp. 118–159). essay, Reaktion Books.
- Dreyer, John Louis Emil (1890). Tycho Brahe: A Picture of Scientific Life and Work in the Sixteenth Century. Edinburgh: Adam and Charles Black.
- Feingold, Mordechai; Navarro-Brotons, Víctor, eds. (2006). Universities and Science in the Early Modern Period. Dordrecht: Springer. ISBN 978-14020-3-975-1.
- Ferguson, Kitty (2002). The nobleman and his housedog: Tycho Brahe and Johannes Kepler: the strange partnership that revolutionised science. London: Review. Bibcode:2002nhtb.book.....F.
- Gilder, J.; Gilder, A. L. (2005). Heavenly intrigue: Johannes Kepler, Tycho Brahe, and the murder behind one of history's greatest scientific discoveries. Anchor. ISBN 978-1400031764.
- Figala, Karin (1972). "Tycho brahes elixier". Annals of Science. 28 (2): 139–176. doi:10.1080/00033797200200111. PMID 11619597.
- Gingerich, Owen (1973). "Copernicus and Tycho". Scientific American. 173 (6): 86–101. Bibcode:1973SciAm.229f..86G. doi:10.1038/scientificamerican1273-86.
- Gingerich, Owen; Westman, Robert S. (1988). "The Wittich Connection: Conflict and Priority in Late Sixteenth-Century Cosmology". Transactions of the American Philosophical Society. 78 (7). American Philosophical Society. doi:10.2307/1006552. ISSN 0065-9746. JSTOR 1006552.
- Gotfredsen, Edvard (1955). "Tycho Brahes sidste sygdom og død" [The final illness and death of Tycho Brahe]. Fund og Forskning I Det Kongelige Biblioteks Samlinger. 2: 33–38. doi:10.7146/fof.v2i1.41115. ISSN 0069-9896.
- Graney, C. M. (2012). "Science rather than God: Riccioli's review of the case for and against the Copernican hypothesis". Journal for the History of Astronomy. 43 (2): 215–225. arXiv:1103.2057. Bibcode:2012JHA....43..215G. doi:10.1177/002182861204300206. S2CID 120484303.
- Hashimoto, Keizo (1987). "Longomontanus's" Astronomia Danica" in China". Journal for the History of Astronomy. 18 (2): 95–110. Bibcode:1987JHA....18...95H. doi:10.1177/002182868701800202. S2CID 115238854.
- Hetherington, Edith W.; Hetherington, Norriss S. (2009). Astronomy and Culture. ABC-CLIO.
- Håkansson, Håkan (2004). "Tycho the Apocalyptic: History, Prophecy, and the Meaning of Natural Phenomena" (PDF). Acta Historicae Rerum Naturalium Necnon Technicarum. 8: 211–236.
- Håkansson, Håkan (2006). Att låta själen flyga mellan himlens tinnar [Letting the soul fly among the turrets of the sky]. Stockholm: Atlantis. ISBN 978-9173531047.
- Henderson, Andrew; Galeano, Gloria; Bernal, Rodrigo (2019). Field Guide to the Palms of the Americas. Princeton, NJ: Princeton University Press. ISBN 978-06910-1-600-9.
- Hoskin, Michael, ed. (1997). The Cambridge Concise History of Astronomy (1st ed.). Cambridge: Cambridge University Press. ISBN 978-0521576000.
- Høg, Erik (2009). "400 years of astrometry: from Tycho Brahe to Hipparcos". Experimental Astronomy. 25 (1–3): 225–240. Bibcode:2009ExA....25..225H. doi:10.1007/s10686-009-9156-7. S2CID 121722096.
- Jackson, E. Atlee (2001). Exploring Nature's Dynamics. Wiley-IEEE. p. 12. ISBN 978-0471191469.
- Jardine, Nicholas (2006). "Kepler as castigator and historian: His preparatory notes for Contra Ursum". Journal for the History of Astronomy. 37 (3): 257–297. Bibcode:2006JHA....37..257J. doi:10.1177/002182860603700302. S2CID 117910608.
- Kerr-Peterson, Miles; Pearce, Michael (2020). James VI's English Subsidy and Danish Dowry Accounts. Scottish History Society Miscellany XVI. Woodbridge. ISBN 978-0-906245-45-3.
- Kragh, Helge (2005). Fra Middelalderlærdom til Den Nye Videnskab. Dansk Naturvidenskabs Historie (in Danish). Vol. 1. Aarhus: Aarhus Universitetsforlag. ISBN 978-8779341685.
- Kragh, Helge (2007). "Received wisdom in biography: Tycho biographies from Gassendi to Christianson". The History and Poetics of Scientific Biography. pp. 121–134.
- Krause, Oliver; Tanaka, Masaomi; Usuda, Tomonori; Hattori, Takashi; Goto, Miwa; Birkmann, Stephan; Nomoto, Ken'ichi (2008). "Tycho Brahe's 1572 supernova as a standard type Ia as revealed by its light-echo spectrum". Nature. 456 (7222): 617–619. arXiv:0810.5106. Bibcode:2008Natur.456..617K. doi:10.1038/nature07608. PMID 19052622. S2CID 4409995.
- Linton, Christopher M. (2004). From Eudoxus to Einstein – A History of Mathematical Astronomy. Cambridge: Cambridge University Press. ISBN 978-0521827508.
- Malgouyres, Philippe (2025). La Science de l'émerveillement. Artistes et intellectuels à la cour de Rodolphe II (1552-1612). Paris: Mare & Martin. ISBN 978-2-36222-125-5.
- Moesgaard, Kristian Peder (1972). "Copernican influence on Tycho Brahe"". In Dobrzycki, Jerzy (ed.). The Reception of Copernicus' Heliocentric Theory. Dordrecht & Boston: D. Reidel Publishing. ISBN 978-9027703118.
- Mosley, Adam (2007). Bearing the heavens: Tycho Brahe and the astronomical community of the late sixteenth century. Cambridge University Press. Bibcode:2007bhtb.book.....M.
- Olson, Donald W.; Olson, Marilynn S.; Doescher, Russell L. (1998). "The stars of Hamlet". Sky & Telescope. 96 (November): 68. Bibcode:1998S&T....96e..68O.
- Rawlins, Dennis (1993). "Tycho's 1004-Star Catalog / The First Critical Edition" (PDF). Dio (PDF). 3. The International Journal of Scientific History: 3. Bibcode:1993DIO.....3....3R. ISSN 1041-5440.
- Repcheck, Jack (2008). Copernicus's Secret: How the Scientific Revolution Began. Simon & Schuster. ISBN 978-0743289528.
- Russell, J. L. (1989). "Catholic astronomers and the Copernican system after the condemnation of Galileo". Annals of Science. 46 (4): 365–386. doi:10.1080/00033798900200291.
- Shackelford, Jole (1993). "Tycho Brahe, laboratory design, and the aim of science: reading plans in context". Isis. 84 (2): 211–230. Bibcode:1993Isis...84..211S. doi:10.1086/356460. ISSN 0021-1753. S2CID 144725873.
- Stephenson, Bruce (1987). Kepler's Physical Astronomy. Princeton, NJ: Princeton University Press. ISBN 978-0691036526.
- Šolcová, Alena (2005). "From Tycho Brahe to Incorrect Tycho de Brahe: A Searching for the First Occurrence, when the Mistaken Name of Famous Astronomer Appeared". Acta Universitatis Carolinae, Mathematica et Physica. 46, Supplementum: 29–36. Bibcode:2005AcMPh..45...29S. ISSN 0001-7140.
- Swerdlow, Noel M. (2004). "An Essay on Thomas Kuhn's First Scientific Revolution, The Copernican Revolution" (PDF). Proceedings of the American Philosophical Society. 48 (1): 64–120. ISSN 0003-049X. Archived from the original (PDF) on 12 June 2011.
- Swerdlow, Noel M. (1996). "Astronomy in the Renaissance". In Walker, C. (ed.). Astronomy before the Telescope. London: British Museum Press. ISBN 978-07141-1-746-1.
- Taton, René; Wilson, Curtis, eds. (1989). Planetary astronomy from the Renaissance to the rise of astrophysics: Part A – Tycho Brahe to Newton. The General History of Astronomy. Cambridge: Cambridge University Press. ISBN 978-0521242547.
- Thoren, Victor E.; Christianson, John Robert (1990). The Lord of Uraniborg: A Biography of Tycho Brahe. Cambridge University Press. ISBN 978-05213-5-158-4.
- Thoren, Victor E. (1988). "Prosthaphaeresis Revisited". Historia Mathematica. 15 (1): 32–39. doi:10.1016/0315-0860(88)90047-x. ISSN 0315-0860.
- Thoren, Victor E. (1967). "Tycho and Kepler on the Lunar Theory". Publications of the Astronomical Society of the Pacific. 79 (470): 482–489. Bibcode:1967PASP...79..482T. doi:10.1086/128534. ISSN 1538-3873. S2CID 120936937.
- Vermij, R. (2007). "Putting the Earth in Heaven: Philips Lansbergen, the early Dutch Copernicans and the Mechanization of the World Picture". In Bucciantini, M.; Camerota, M.; Roux, S. (eds.). Mechanics and Cosmology in the Medieval and Early Modern Period. Firenze: Olski. pp. 121–141. ISBN 978-88222-5-661-4.
- Wesley, Walter G. (1978). "The Accuracy of Tycho Brahe's Instruments". Journal for the History of Astronomy. 9: 42–53. Bibcode:1978JHA.....9...42W. doi:10.1177/002182867800900102. ISSN 0021-8286. S2CID 118013162.
- Wittendorff, Alex (1994). Tyge Brahe (in Danish). Copenhagen: G. E. C. Gad. ISBN 978-87120-2-272-5.
- Wyner, Lawrence M (2015). "Urologic Demise of Astronomer Tycho Brahe: A Cosmic Case of Urinary Retention". Urology. 88: 22–35. doi:10.1016/j.urology.2015.10.006. ISSN 0090-4295. PMID 26548950.
