= Evection =

In astronomy, evection (Latin for "carrying away") is the largest inequality produced by the action of the Sun in the monthly revolution of the Moon around the Earth. The evection, formerly called the moon's second anomaly, was approximately known in ancient times, and its discovery is attributed to Hipparchus or Ptolemy. The current name itself dates much more recently, from the 17th century: it was coined by Bullialdus in connection with his own theory of the Moon's motion.

Evection causes the Moon's ecliptic longitude to vary by approximately ± 1.274° (degrees), with a period of about 31.8 days. The evection in longitude is given by the expression $+4586.45''\sin (2D-\ell)$, where $D$ is the mean angular distance of the Moon from the Sun (its elongation), and $\ell$ is the mean angular distance of the Moon from its perigee (mean anomaly).

It arises from an approximately six-monthly periodic variation of the eccentricity of the Moon's orbit and a libration of similar period in the position of the Moon's perigee, caused by the action of the Sun.

The evection opposes the Moon's equation of the center at the new and full moons, and augments the equation of the center at the Moon's quarters. This can be seen from the combination of the principal term of the equation of the center with the evection: $+22639.55''\sin(\ell) +4586.45''\sin(2D-\ell).$

At new and full moons, D=0° or 180°, 2D is effectively zero in either case, and the combined expression reduces to $+(22639.55-4586.45)''\sin(\ell).$

At the quarters, D=90° or 270°, 2D is effectively 180° in either case, changing the sign of the expression for the evection, so that the combined expression then reduces to $+(22639.55+4586.45)''\sin(\ell)$ .

== Bibliography ==
- Brown, E.W. An Introductory Treatise on the Lunar Theory. Cambridge University Press, 1896 (republished by Dover, 1960).
- Brown, E.W. Tables of the Motion of the Moon. Yale University Press, New Haven CT, 1919, at pp. 1–28.
- H Godfray, An Elementary Treatise on the Lunar Theory, (London, 1871, 3rd ed.).
- O Neugebauer, A History of Ancient Mathematical Astronomy (Springer, 1975), vol. 1, at pp. 84–85.
- R Taton & C Wilson (eds.), Planetary astronomy from the Renaissance to the rise of astrophysics, part A: Tycho Brahe to Newton, (Cambridge University Press, 1989), at pp. 194–195.
