= Brahe (disambiguation) =

Brahe is the name of two closely related Scanian noble families.

Brahe may also refer to:

== People with the surname ==
- Aurora Wilhelmina Brahe (1778–1852), Swedish lady-in-waiting and politically active salonist
- Ebba Brahe (1596–1674), Swedish countess, landowner and courtier
- Elsa Beata Brahe (1629–1653), Swedish countess and duchess
- Elsa Elisabeth Brahe (1632–1689), Swedish countess and duchess
- Erik Brahe (1722–1756), Swedish count executed for treason
- Erik Brahe (1552–1614), Swedish governor, councilor and count of Visingsborg
- Gustaf Brahe (1558–1615), Swedish riksråd and Polish field marshal
- Jørgen Thygesen Brahe (1515–1565), Danish nobleman
- Karen Brahe (1657–1736), Danish aristocrat and book collector
- Louise Bille-Brahe (1830–1910), Danish courtier
- Magnus Brahe (1564–1633), Swedish nobleman
- Magnus Brahe (1790–1844), Swedish statesman and soldier
- Margareta Brahe (1603–1669), Swedish aristocrat and court official
- Margareta Brahe (1559–1638), Swedish courtier
- May Brahe (1884–1956), Australian composer
- Nils Brahe (1604–1632), Swedish soldier
- Otte Brahe (1518–1571), Danish nobleman and statesman
- Otte Steensen Brahe (1578–1651), Danish landowner and money lender
- Per Brahe the Elder (1520–1590), Swedish statesman
- Per Brahe the Younger (1602–1680), Swedish soldier, statesman and author
- Sigrid Brahe (1568–1608), Swedish countess
- Sophia Brahe (1556/1559–1643), Danish noble woman
- Steen Ottesen Brahe (1523–1677), Danish military officer and landowner
- Steen Ottesen Brahe (landowner), Danish privy counsellor and landowner
- Tycho Brahe (1546–1601), Danish nobleman, astronomer and writer
- William Brahe, Australian explorer; see Burke and Wills expedition

== Other uses ==
- Brda (river) (German: Brahe), in Poland
- Brahe (planet), an extrasolar planet
- Brahe Basket, a Swedish basketball team
- Brahe Church, in Sweden
- Brahe Djäknar, a Finnish choir
- Brahe House, in Augusta, Georgia, U.S.
- MS Brahe, a vessel
- Anne Claire, Brenna and Tycho Brahe, characters in the webcomic Penny Arcade

== See also ==
- Jørgen Brahe (disambiguation)
- Magnus Brahe (disambiguation)
- Per Brahe (disambiguation)
- Steen Ottesen Brahe (disambiguation)
- Tycho Brahe (disambiguation)
