= Bille (surname) =

Bille is a Danish surname. Bille is also a Hindu Vaishya surname in India. Notable people with the surname include:

- Anders Bille (1600–1657), Danish general
- Beate Bille (disambiguation), multiple people
- Edmond Bille (1878–1959), Swiss artist
- Ejler Bille (1910–2004), Danish artist
- Gaëtan Bille (born 1988), Belgian cyclist
- Irene Ibsen Bille (1901–1985), Norwegian writer and playwright
- Jens Bille (1531–1575), Danish courtier and compiler of a poetry manuscript, Jens Billes visebog
- Joen Bille (born 1944), Danish actor
- Josef Bille (1944–2023), German physician
- Kristina Bille (born 1986), Danish handball player
- Michael Bille (1769–1845), Danish admiral
- S. Corinna Bille (1912–1979), Swiss writer
- Steen Andersen Bille (1751–1833), Danish admiral
- Steen Andersen Bille (1797–1883), Danish admiral
- Steen Bille, Danish diplomat
- Svend Bille (1888–1973), Danish actor
- Téclaire Bille (1988–2010), Equatoguinean footballer
