= Jørgen Rosenkrantz =

Danish county governor and headmaster (1607–1675)

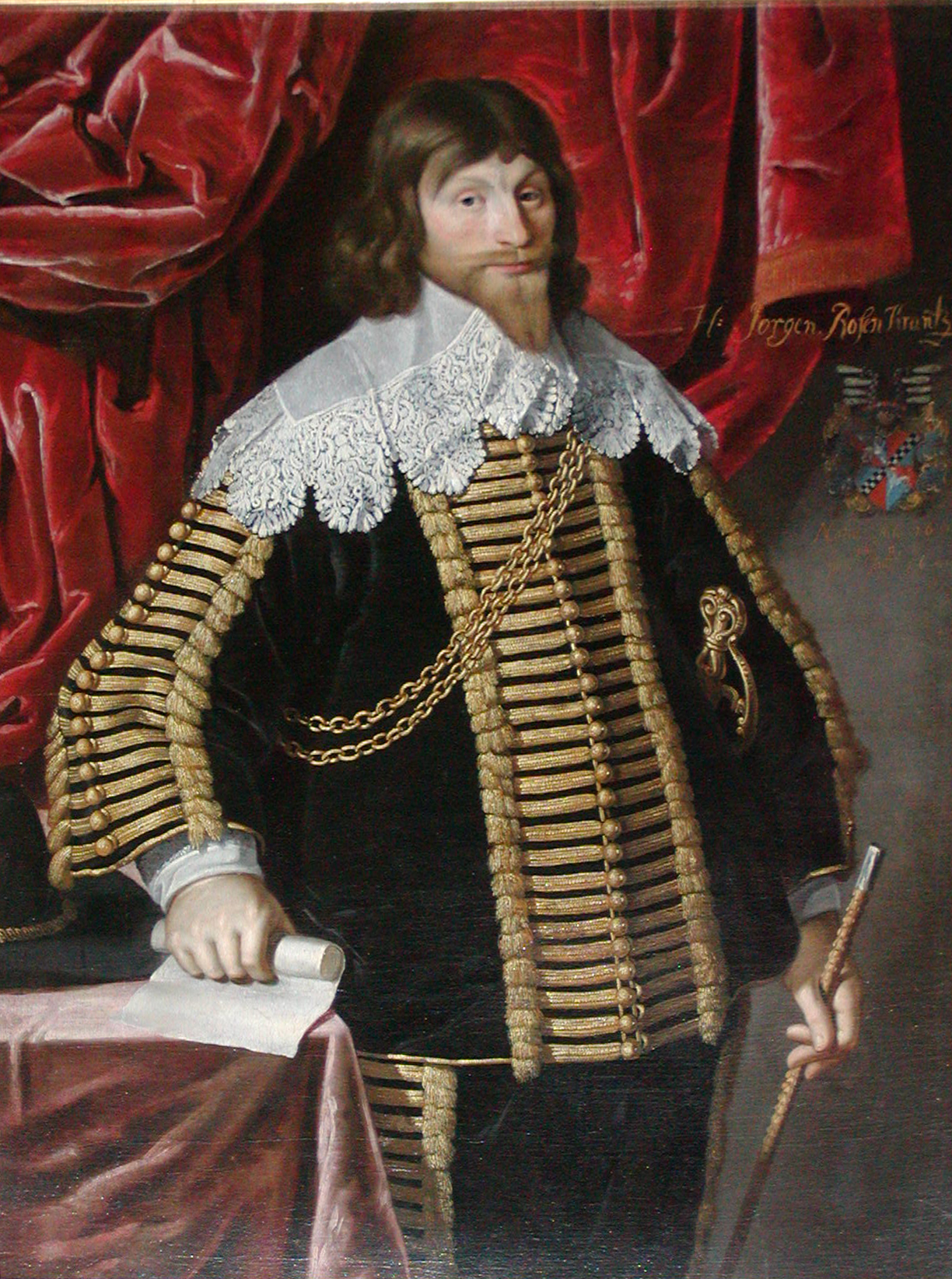
Jørgen Rosenkrantz

Jørgen Rosenkrantz (11 July 1607 – 8 January 1675) was a Danish nobleman who served as headmaster of Sorø Academy and the first county governor of Sorø County.

== Early life and education ==
Rosenkrantz was born on 11 July 1607 at Rosenlund, the son of privy councillor Holger Rosenkrantz til Rosenholm (1574–1642) and Sophie Axelsdatter Brahe (1578–1646). He attended Sorø Academy from 1624 before continuing his education abroad in Oxford and Orléans.

== Career ==
In 1632, Rosenkrantz headed the Danish delegation to Breslaumødet. In 1633–37, he worked in Danske Kancelli. In 1639, he was granted a prelature in Viborg. In 1648–53, he served as royal treasurer (Rentemester). In 1652, he con-founded the Danish Greenland Company. In 1653, he was nominated for the privy council and appointed hofmeister at Sorø Academy and headmaster of Herlufsholm School. In 1662, he became the first county governor of Sorø County. During the Swedish Wars, in 1657–60, when Sorø Academy lost most of its income, Rosenkrantz continued the operations at his own expense. He was nonetheless unable to prevent its dissolution in 1665. After Hans Svane's death in 1668, he unsuccessfully tried to succeed him as bishop of Roskilde.

== Personal life and property ==
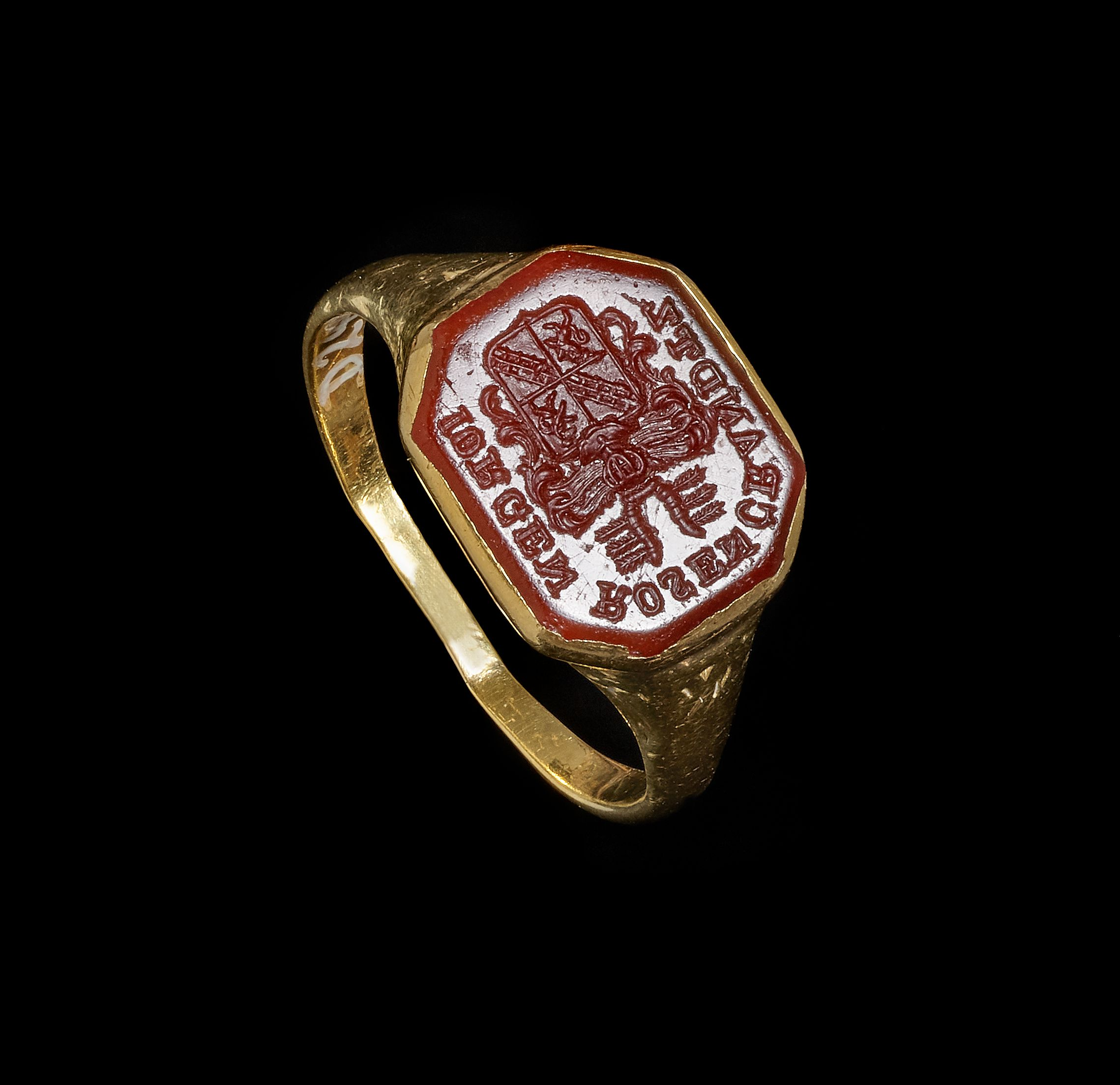
Jørgen Rosenkrantz's signet ring

On 12 March 1637, Rosenkrantz married Christence Juel (1612–1680). She was the daughter of governor-general in Norway Jens Hermansson Juel (1580–1634) and Ide Lange (1584–1649).

Through his marriage, Rosenkrantz came into possession of Keldgård (sold 1668) as well as a stake in Åbjerg (sold no later than 1662). He also owned Hostrup (1666–68) and Ågårdsholm as well as a townhouse on Østergade in Copenhagen. In 1647–61, he was a shareholder in Kongsberg Silver Mines.

In 1647, he was granted the fiefs of Ustein kloster (1651–52), Halsnø kloster and Hardanger (1651–55). In his capacity of hofmeister at Sorø Acqademy, he was also granted Børglum kloster (until 1669).

In the 19th century, Rosenkrantz's signet ring was found in Frederiksholm Canal in Copenhagen. It was subsequently handed over to the politician Iver Rosenkrantz. It is now in the collection of the National Museum of Denmark.
