= Mette Gøye =

Danish noblewoman, writer, and translator (1599–1664)

- Born: June 27, 1599; Skørringe, Falster, Denmark
- Died: October 17, 1664 (aged 65); Copenhagen, Denmark
- Noble family: Gøye
- Occupation: Writer; translator

Mette Gøye (27 June 1599 – 17 October 1664) was a Danish noblewoman, writer, and translator. Gøye was born to Henrik Gøye and Birgitte Brahe on 27 June 1599 in Skørringe, on the island of Falster, Denmark. After her father's death in 1611, her five brothers were sent to live with their uncle Holger Rosenkrantz and aunt Sophie Axelsdatter Brahe. In 1619, after her mother's death, Mette and her five sisters joined their brothers. When her uncle died in 1642, Mette moved to Copenhagen, where she lived until her death on 17 October 1664. Gøye is known for her autobiography, translations, and original written works.
