= Bilse =

Bilse is a surname. Notable people with the surname include:

- Benjamin Bilse (1816–1902), German conductor and composer
- Fritz Oswald Bilse (1878–1951), German author and lieutenant of the Prussian army

== See also ==
- Bille (surname)
