= Dagmar Cross =

Byzantine reliquary gold cross

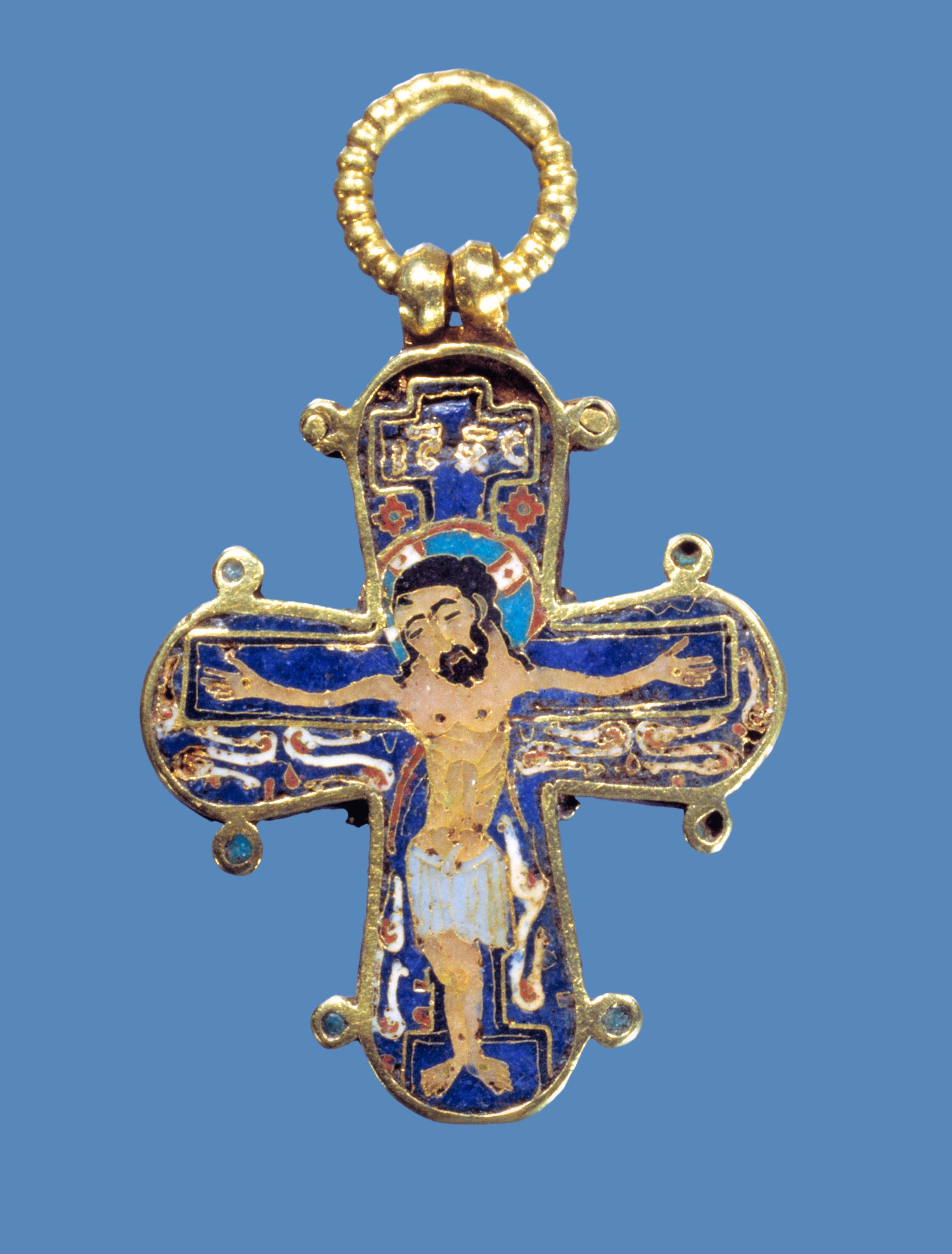
- Material: Gold
- Created: 11th century
- Discovered: 1683; St. Bendt's Church, Ringsted, Denmark
- Present location: National Museum of Denmark, Copenhagen

The Dagmar Cross is an 11th or 12th-century Byzantine reliquary cross made of gold with cloisonné enameling, traditionally thought to have belonged to Queen Dagmar, although it may just as well have belonged to her sister-in-law, Richiza, and which is now on display in the National Museum of Denmark. Replica of the cross are in Denmark traditionally given to girls in connection with their baptism or confirmation.

== Discovery ==
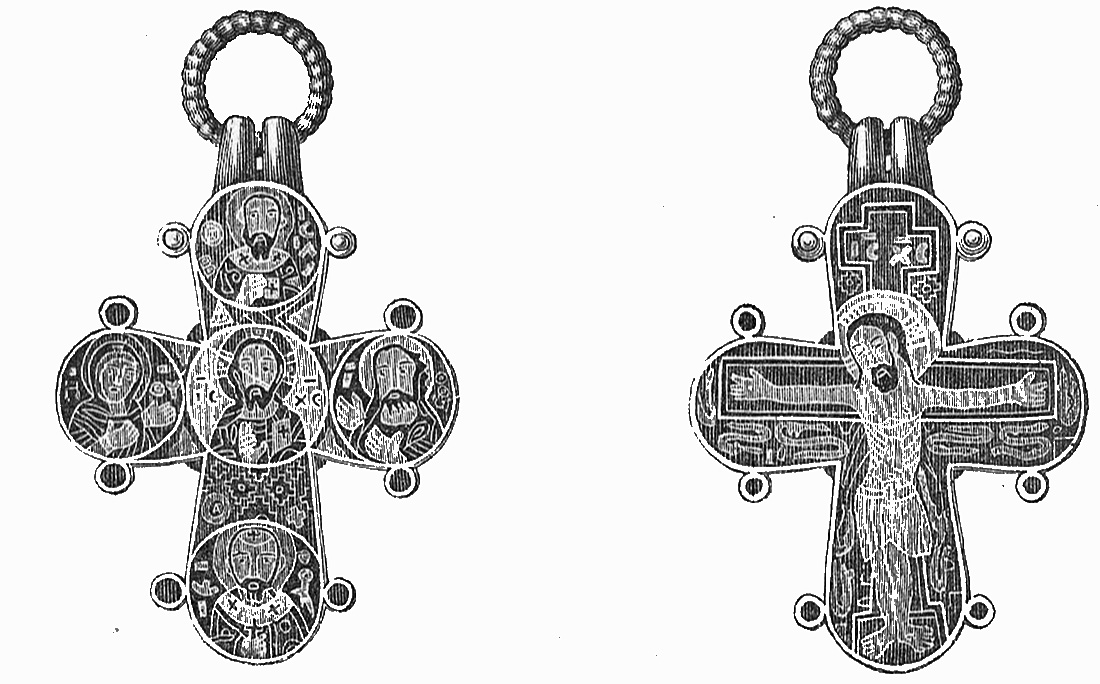
Illustration from Nordens historie (1995)

The Dagmar Cross was discovered in 1683 in St. Bendt's Church, supposedly when provost Christian Blichfeld removed two royal tombs, entirely or partially, to make room for a tomb for his wife. After its transfer to the Royal Treasury (Det Kongelige Kunstkammer) in 1695, it became known as the Dagmar Cross since it was believed to have belonged to the popular Queen Dagmar, who died in 1212. It is, however, more likely that it has belonged to Valdemar II's sister, Richiza, who died in 1220. Both their tombs were destroyed.

== Description ==
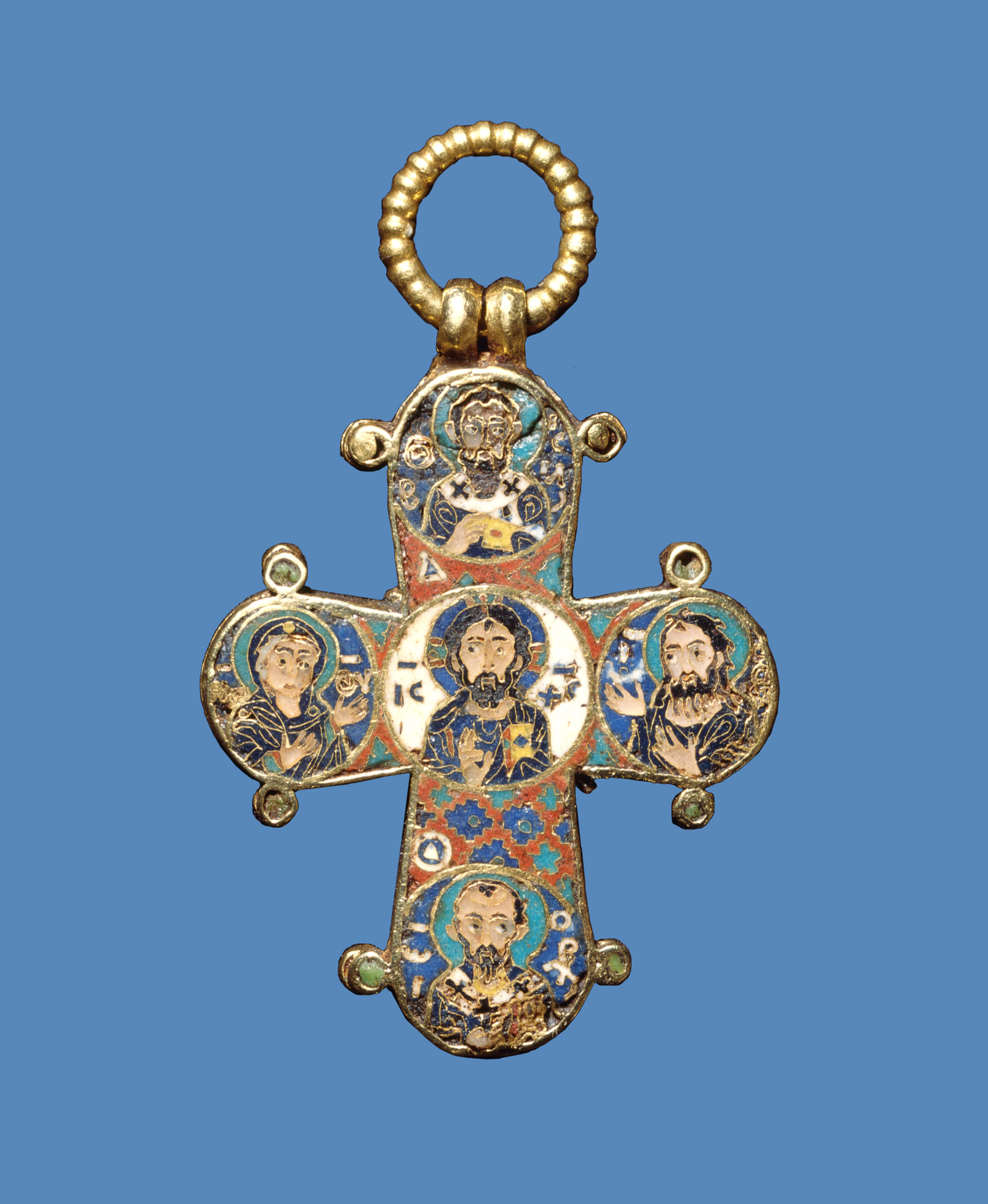
The rear side

The cross is made from gold and enamel, and measures approximately 4.3 by 2.9 by 0–3 centimetres (1.7 in × 1.1 in × 0.0 in–1.2 in). One side of the cross depicts Christ on the cross, and on the other side, Christ as judge with Mary and John the Baptist, as well as the two Greek Orthodox saints Basil of Caesarea and John Chrysostom.

== Replica and traditions ==
In 1863, Frederik VII of Denmark presented a copy of the Dagmar Cross to Alexandra of Denmark as a wedding present in connection with her marriage to Albert Edward, the Prince of Wales. Since then, replicas of the cross have become common as jewellery. In particular, it became a common practice to give a Dagmar Cross to girls in connection with their baptism or confirmation.

== See also ==
- Gunhild Cross
- Middelfart Crown
