= Steen Ottesen Brahe =

Steen Ottesen Brahe may refer to:

- Steen Ottesen Brahe (landowner) (1547–1620), Danish landowner
- Steen Ottesen Brahe (military officer) (1623–1677), Danish military officer
