= Sophie Axelsdatter Brahe =

Danish noblewoman (1578–1646)

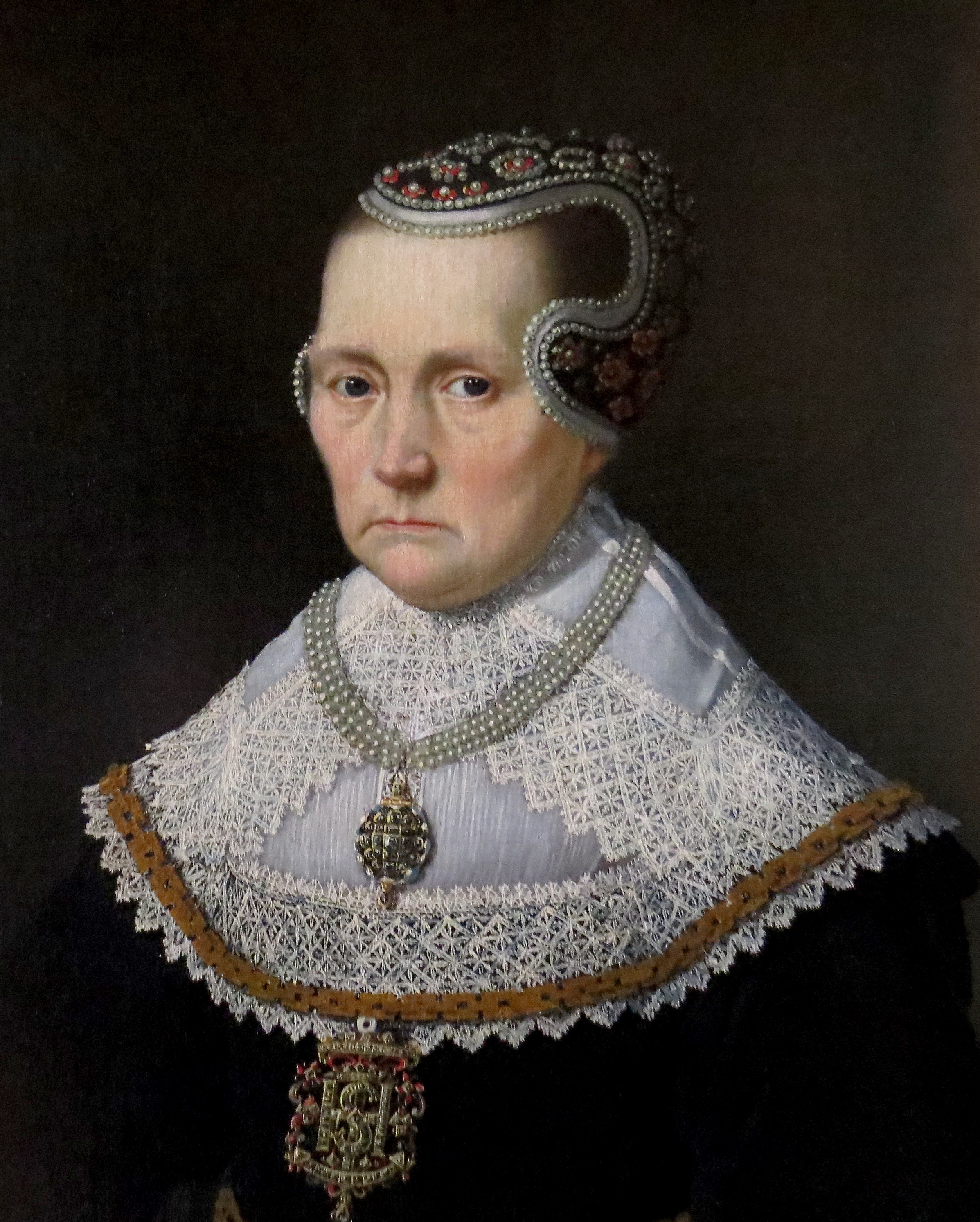
- Portrait by Johan Jørgensen Kulbars
- Born: 11 May 1578; Elvedgård, Funen, Denmark
- Died: 21 December 1646 (aged 68); Copenhagen, Denmark
- Noble family: Brahe (birth); Rosenkrantz (marriage)
- Spouse: Holger Rosenkrantz
- Issue: 13, including Jørgen Rosenkrantz

Sophie Axelsdatter Brahe (11 May 1578 – 21 December 1646) was a Danish noblewoman and landowner. She is notable for being the first confirmed owner of Gunhild Cross. She was married to nobleman Holger Rosenkrantz, with whom she had 13 children, and raised 10 of her nieces and nephews, including Anne Gøye. She was also known for her accounting, of which her books are held in the Karen Brahe library, and landowning.

== Biography ==
Sophie Axelsdatter Brahe was born on 11 May 1578 at Elvedgård, Funen, Denmark. Brahe is the first documented owner of Gunhild Cross, a carved walrus-ivory crucifix of medieval origin. She was a devout Christian.

She died on 21 December 1646 in Copenhagen, Denmark.
