= Gunhild Cross =

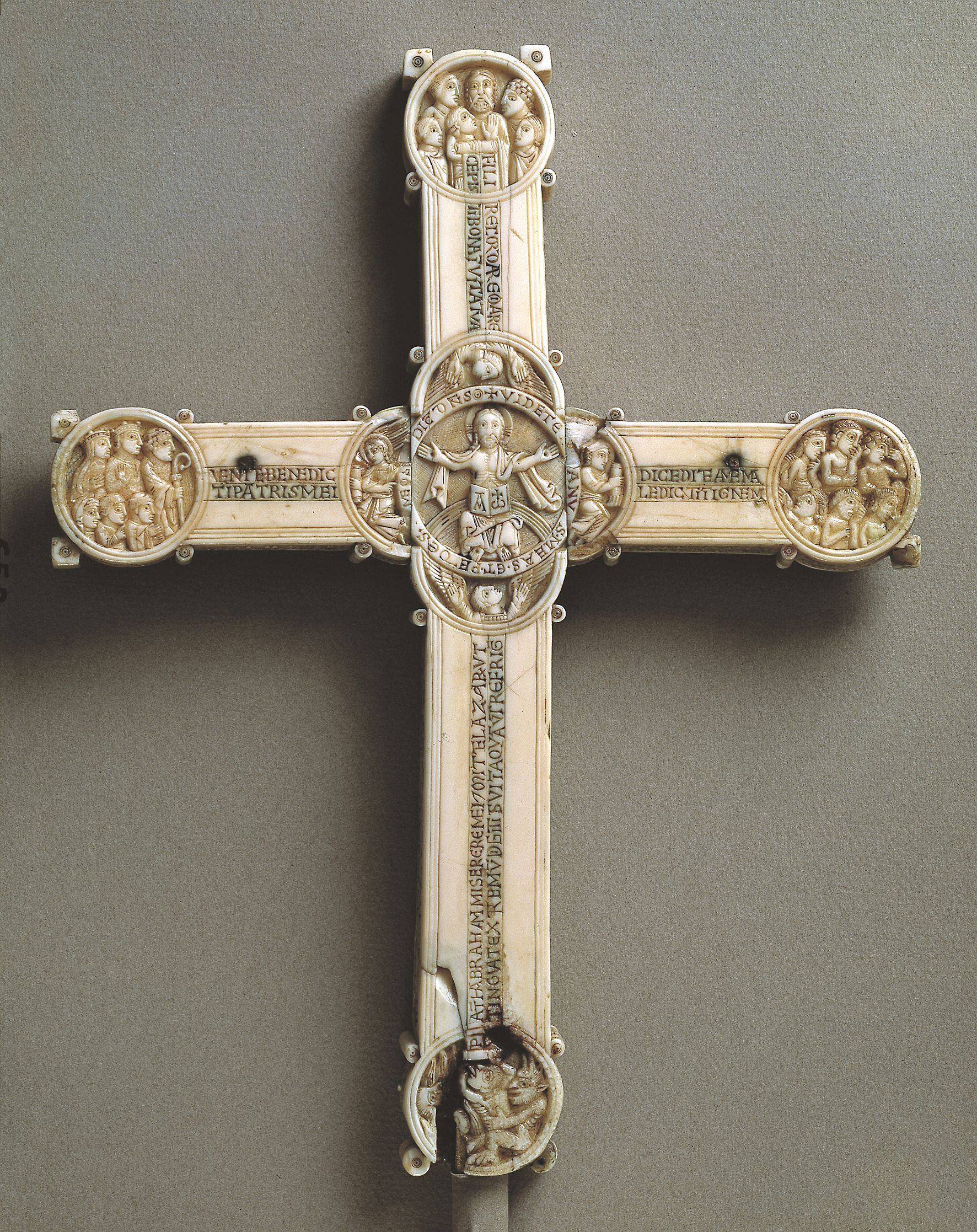
- Material: Ivory
- Created: 12th century
- Present location: National Museum of Denmark, Copenhagen

The Gunhild Cross (Danish: Gunhildkorset), named for its first owner, Gunhild, a daughter of Svend III of Denmark, is a mid-12th-century crucifix carved in walrus tusk and with both Latin and Runic inscriptions. It is now in the collection of the National Museum of Denmark.

== History ==
It is believed that the cross was created around 1150. A Latin inscription reads "Liutgerus who carved me at the behest of Helena, who is also called Gunnhildr". Based on research by Harald Langberg, it is believed that King Svend refers to Svend III Grathe, (died 1157) and not as previously believed Sweyn II Estridsen. The artist Luitger is not known from other works.

The first mention of the cross was found to be in 1650, which at that time supposedly belonged to Sophie Axelsdatter Brahe, the daughter of Axel Ottesen Brahe (and the wife of Holger Rosenkrantz.) Axel Brahe held the lands of St Cnut's Kloster and the convent of Dalum, and may have found the cross among their relics.

In 1684, it was acquired by the Royal Cabinet of Curiosities (Kunstkammer). In 1945, it was transferred to the National Museum of Denmark.

== Description ==
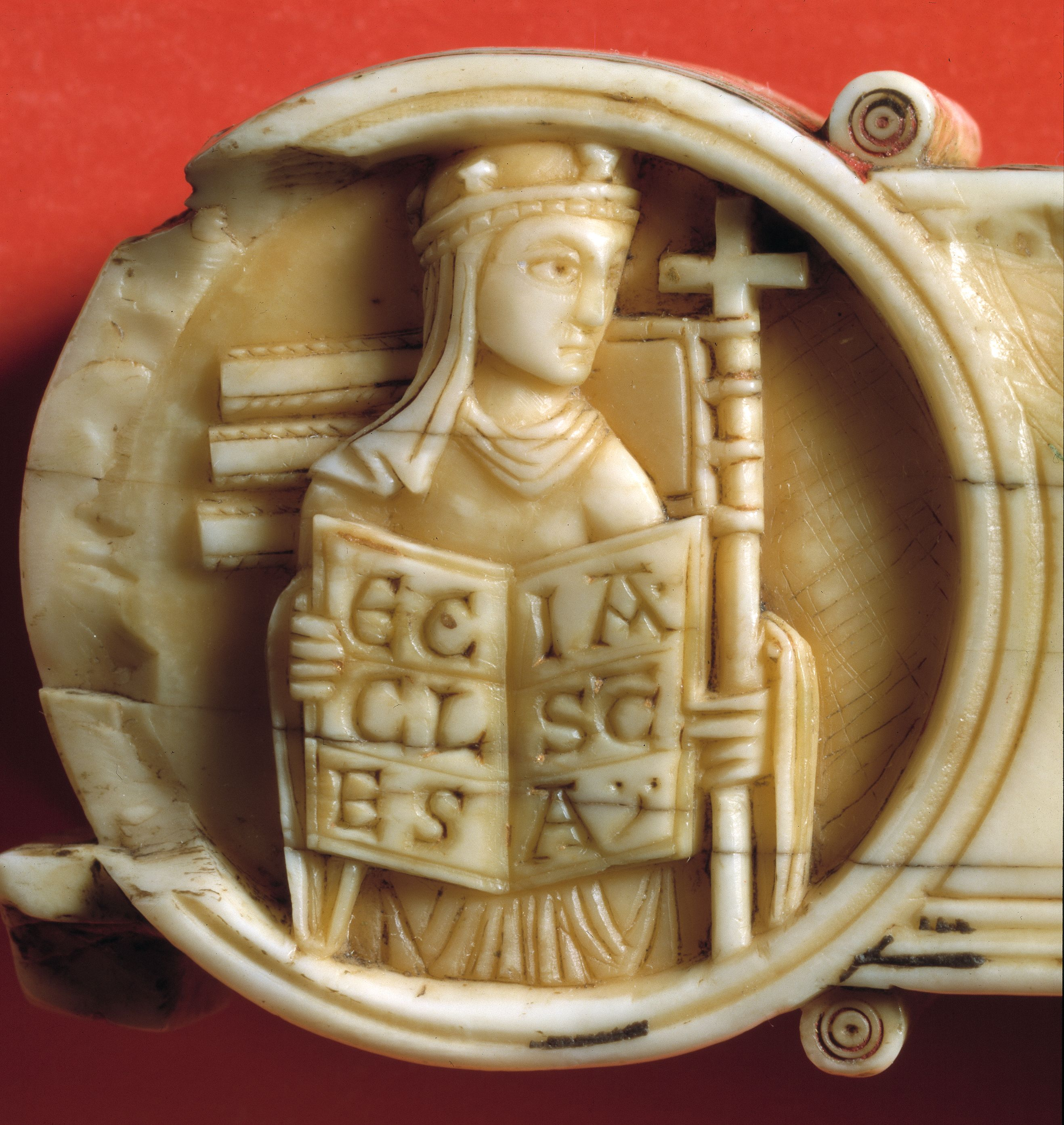
Detail

The cross is carved in two blocks of walrus tusk and measures 29 cm × 22 cm (11.4 in × 8.7 in). It was originally painted in red, blue and golden colours.

The central Christ figure on the front side is missing. The four cross arms are decorated with carved medallions of female figures, symbolizing "Life" (top), "Death" (bottom), the "victorious church" (left) and the "defeated synagogue" (right). The rear side of the cross is also decorated with carvings. In the centre is a Last Judgement representation of Christ in Majesty. The four medallions depict scenes from Heaven (top) and Hell (bottom) as well as the saved (left) and damned souls (right).

The Latin inscriptions are written carved in relatively wide capital letters with an abundant use of ligatures and abbreviations. The name Gunhild is also written in runes on the edge of the bottom medallion. The Latin inscription reads:

English translation
Jesus of Nazareth, king of the Jews. Life, Death, the Holy Church, the Synagogue. Regard my hands and my feet says the Lord. Come here, into my Father's blessing, go away from me, you accursed, to (eternal) fire. Father Abraham, take pity on me and send Lazarus, that he may dip his finger in water and cool (my tongue). Son, remember that you received good things in your life. Gunnhildr. He who sees me shall pray to Christ for Helena, daughter of King Suenono Magnus, who has had me made in remembrance of the Lord's suffering. Those who believe in the crucified Christ, shall in their prayers remember Liutgerus who carved me at the behest of Helena, who is also called Gunnhildr.

In Latin
Side A Iesus Nazarenus rex judeorum vita mors ecclesia sancta synagoga Side B Videte [m]anus meas et pedes meos dicit Dominus venite benedicti patris mei dicedite a me maledicti in ignem pater Habraham miserere mei et mitte Lazarum ut [in]tinguat extremum digiti sui in aquam ut refrig fili recordare quia recepisti bona in vita tua Side C Gunhild qui me cernit pro Helena magni Sueonis regis filia Christum oret que me ad memoriam Dominice passionis parari fecerat Side D Qui in Christum crucifixum credunt Liutgeri memo[ri]am orando faciant qui me sculpserat roga tu Helene que et Gunhild vocat[ur].

== See also ==
- Dagmar Cross
