= Marcus Gøye =

Danish nobleman, courtier, and diplomat (1635–1698)

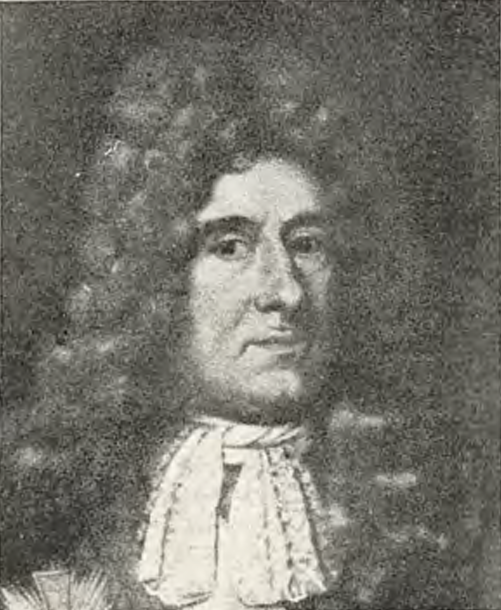
- Born: November 21, 1635; Hvidkilde, Funen, Denmark
- Died: April 28, 1698 (aged 62); Copenhagen, Denmark
- Buried: Herlufsholm Kirke
- Offices: Member of the Gehejmekonseil (1683)
- Noble family: Gøye
- Occupation: Courtier; diplomat; educator
- Education: Sorø Academy (1649–1655)

Danish Ambassador to Spain
- In office September 1678 – 1682
- Monarch: Christian V of Denmark
- Chancellor: Frederik Ahlefeldt

Marcus Gøye (21 November 1635 – 28 April 1698) was a Danish nobleman, courtier, and diplomat. Gøye was born on 21 November 1635 at the Hvidkilde estate on the island of Funen, Denmark, to Falk Gøye and Karen Bille. In 1649, Falk was appointed hofmester of Sorø Academy; Marcus moved there with him and was educated there until 1655. Gøye then traveled Europe on a grand tour from 1655 to 1660. Upon returning to Denmark, Gøye was likely made the chamberlain of Sophie Amalie of Brunswick-Calenberg. Gøye primarily served in government as a diplomat, In 1662, he was sent to France with Hannibal Sehested as the embassy's marshal. On Sehested's recommendation, he then served as Denmark's representative to the court of Louis XIV of France from October 1664 to 1666. He served as ambassador to Spain from September 1678 to 1682. In 1683, he was also appointed to the Gehejmekonseil. In 1685, he was appointed schoolmaster of Herlufsholm. Gøye died on 28 April 1698 in Copenhagen, Denmark; he was the final male heir in the Gøye family. Gøye was buried in Herlufsholm Kirke.
