= Anne Gøye =

Danish noblewoman and book collector

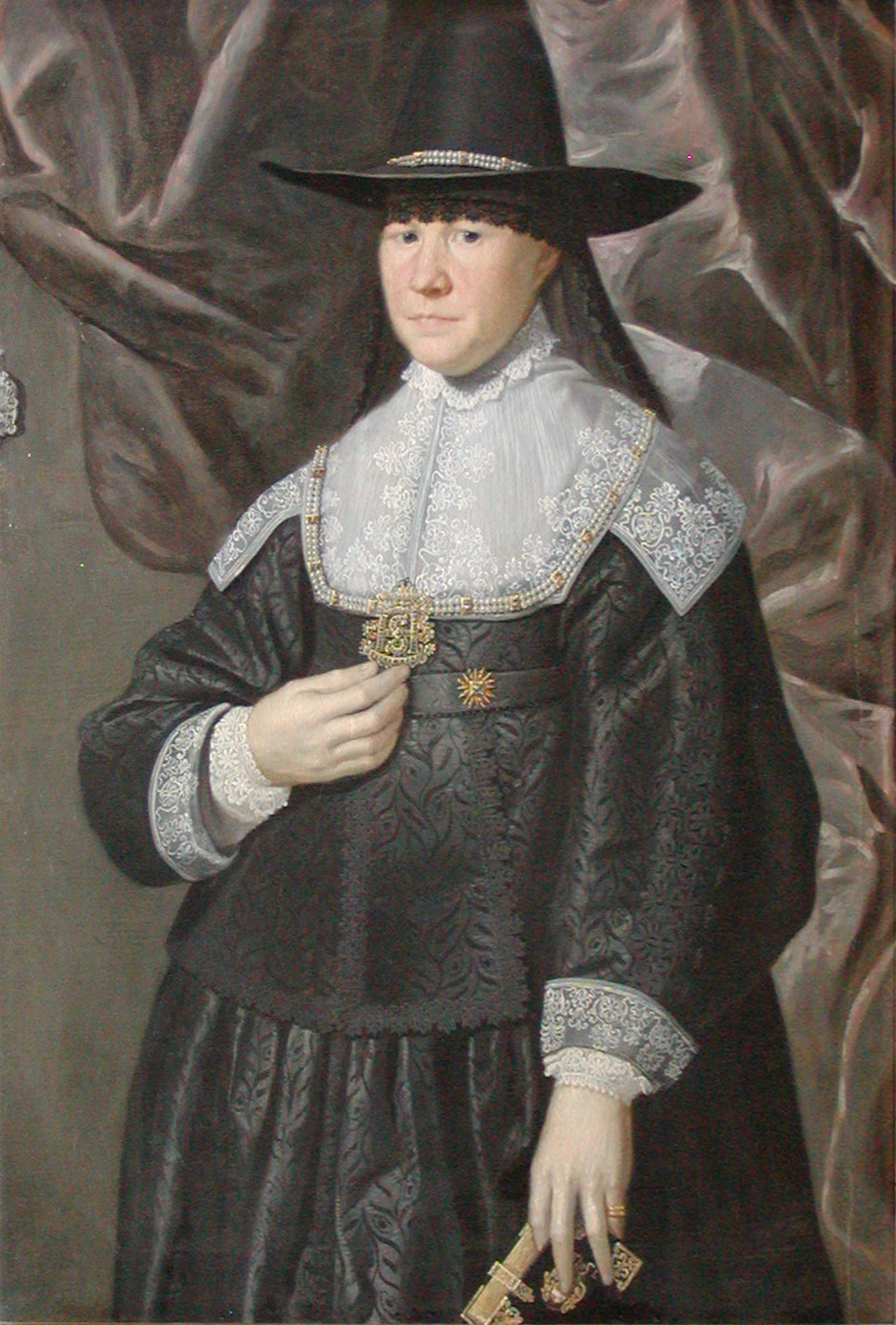
- Painting of Gøye from before 1650
- Born: 18 December 1609; Turebyholm, Denmark
- Died: 9 January 1681 (aged 71); Hvedholm Castle, Denmark
- Resting place: Sorø Abbey Church
- Occupation: Book collector
- Family: Gøye family

Anne Gøye (18 December 1609 – 9 January 1681) was a Danish noblewoman and book collector. She is remembered principally for her collection of Danish-language works. The library she created contained approximately 1000 bound volumes, of which nearly 100 were manuscripts.

Gøye was born into a noble family at the estate of Turebyholm, and raised by her aunt and uncle at Rosenholm Castle. Having received her late mother's library at ten years-old, she began collecting books at an early age. Over the course of her lifetime she transformed what was a family library into a collection referenced and sought after by the academics of her time.

Gøye never married. For much of her adult life she resided with her sister-in-law, Karen Bille, at Hvidkilde before moving independently to Næstved. She left her collection to Karen Bille's granddaughter, Karen Brahe. Brahe subsequently expanded the collection. It is now housed in the Karen Brahe Library in Odense.

== Biography ==
Anne Gøye was born on 18 December 1609 at Turebygård on Zealand, which is now known as Turebyholm. Her father, Henrik Gøye (1562–1611), had acquired the property in 1604. Anne was the ninth of Henrik Gøye and Brigitte Brahe's (1576–1619) ten children. After her father's death in 1611 in the Kalmar War, she and her five sisters remained in their mother's care, while her brothers moved to Rosenholm Castle under the care of their aunt, Sophie Axelsdatter Brahe, and her husband, Holger Rosenkrantz. After her mother died in 1619, she and her sisters also moved in Rosenholm. From the age of 9, she was therefore raised by her aunt and uncle along with their own eight children.

She stayed at Rosenholm until 1627, when her uncle left the estate. Gøye is said to have looked back fondly on the eight years she spent in his care. She then moved to Brandholm to stay briefly with her brother, Eskil. In 1628, she moved to stay with another brother, Falk, who had recently acquired the estate of Hvidkilde though his marriage to Karen Bille. When her brother and sister-in-law moved to Sorø in 1649, she moved with them. After her brother's death in 1653, she and Karen Bille moved back to Hvidkilde. Her sister-in-law had been left in a financial crisis following Falk's death, which Anne sought to remedy; as a result she received half of the Hvidkilde estate until it was sold in 1679.

During the Northern War, she and Karen fled the estate to reside with Karen's daughter, Susanne Gøye (1634–1683), and her husband, Preben Brahe (1627–1708) in Sorø. After the end of the war, Gøye moved to Næstved where she established her own home at a property she had inherited from her mother. She had intended to remain in Næstved for the rest of her "calm and enjoyable" life.

In 1673, she moved to Odense at her niece Susanne's request. She lived at the family property of Odense Adelige Jomfrukloster, from which she could more easily visit their family at Hvedholm. Gøye died on 9 January 1681, while staying at Hvedholm. She was buried at Sorø Abbey Church.

== Book collection ==
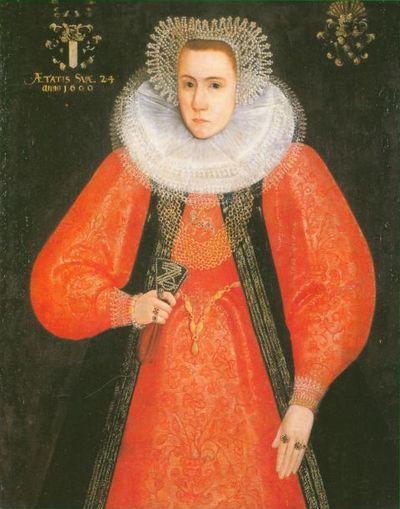
Gøye's mother, Birgitte Axelsdatter Brahe, whose books started her collection.

Gøye is believed to have gained an interest in book collecting from her mother, who gifted Anne her first book in 1613. After her mother's death, Gøye inherited her mother's collection. Around 40 books in Anne Gøye's collection bear her mother's inscription: Hiellp Gud (lit. 'God bless you'). Already in possession of a large number of books at a rather young age, she continued to add to the collection while at Rosenholm. Her additions as a child were likely influenced by her time there, as Rosenholm was known for its significant library. Her uncle, Holger Rosenkrantz, become a noted scholar and was also a significant influence on her. In 1636, he gifted her a collection of writings of Albert of Prussia which he wrote was for "my dear sister's daughter and friend." Her uncle's connections to other Danish scholars is evidenced in her collection, which contains works they had authored.

Though her collection began as a noble family's library, it grew over her lifetime through bequests and gifts, as well as her own purchases. Many of the books in her library are inscribed with her name and information about the book's purchase and provenance. Gøye made her collection available to others during her lifetime, including to Peder Syv, who mentioned her in the acknowledgements of his work. Syv had been a rector at Næstved and used her library in his study of philology and folklore. She herself was well-educated and had, among other things, studied the French language. Her collection contained a manuscript that she produced by translating The Education of a Christian Woman from French into Danish.

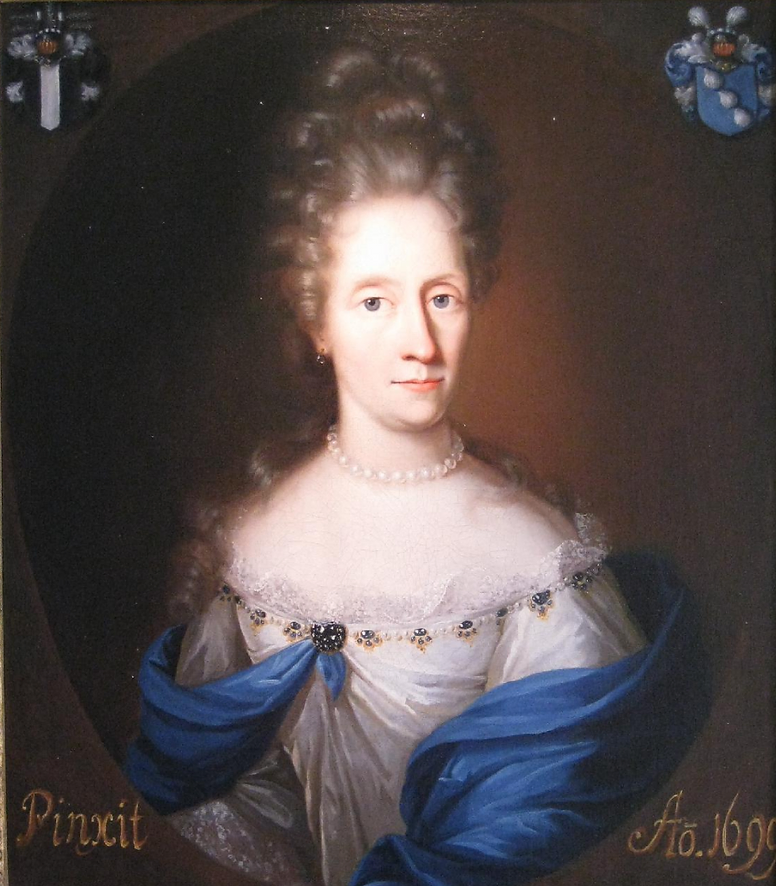
Karen Brahe, who inherited and expanded Gøye's collection into what is now the Karen Brahe Library.

Shortly before her death, Gøye gave her collection to Karen Brahe, the daughter of her niece Susanne. On gifting the collection to Brahe, Gøye stated "I have taken care that after my death, that these which I have gathered with so much diligence and joy, should not be separated." She affirmed her belief that her 23-year old great-niece would "not love, esteem and benefit from them less than I have done." Brahe became a book collector in her own right, greatly expanding the collection and ensuring its preservation into the 21st century.

Alongside the bequest of her collection, Gøye also furnished her grand-niece with funds so that a printed catalogue could be produced to supplement the incomplete manuscript catalogues of her collection that were already in circulation among scholars. Jens Bircherod, then a student of theology and teacher in Odense, compiled a handwritten catalogue of the collection in 1686. His catalogue was likely prepared for publication, though it never made it to the press. At the time, the collection contained 1,116 volumes, including 76 manuscripts. All but one of her collection's printed works (a 1627 Luther Bible) were written in Danish, making the collection unique for the 17th century. The largest portion of its works were on Danish theology. Its fictional works included the writings of Gøye's sister-in-law, Birgitte Thott.
