= Steen Bille =

Danish councillor and diplomat

Steen Bille (1565–1629) was a Danish councillor and diplomat.

He was the son of Jens Bille and Karen Rønnow, and is sometimes called "Steen Jensen Bille". His father compiled a manuscript of ballads, Jens Billes visebog.

As a young man Bille travelled in Europe. He then worked for the council of Danish Regents for the young Christian IV.

== Missions to Scotland ==
Anne of Denmark set out from Copenhagen to Scotland to meet her husband James VI of Scotland in September 1590. The weather forced her to shore near Oslo. Steen Bille, William Stewart, and Andrew Sinclair brought Anne's letters to Edinburgh on 10 October. She described the delay and four or five failed attempts to cross the North Sea, and said she had decided to stay in Norway over the winter. An English man at court, Thomas Fowler wrote that Steen Bille was well "travelled, and some time in England."

=== Flekkerøy and Oslo ===
James VI decided to sail to Norway and escort her back to Denmark. Steen Bille sailed with James VI and went with Andrew Sinclair in advance to Anna of Denmark at Oslo. There was a cannon salute when Bille left the Scottish fleet at Flekkerøy and a sailor was hurt by mistake. It was said that he lost his arm.

=== Surveying the morning gift ===
James VI heard in April 1593 that Henrik Below and Steen Bille were coming as ambassadors. In May Niels Krag and Steen Bille travelled to Scotland. Anne of Denmark, with her friends the Countess of Huntly and the Countess of Mar, and the ladies in waiting of her household came aboard the ambassadors' ship at Leith on 31 May. She gave the sailors a gift of 100 gold crowns. In Edinburgh, the ambassadors lodged in the Canongate at John Kinloch's house close to Holyrood Palace.

The ambassadors' role was to accept the lands of Dunfermline Abbey given to Anne as a "morning gift", and recently re-confirmed in the Parliament of Scotland. They negotiated with John Maitland of Thirlestane who had held some of the lands. Bille and Krag visited the dowry lands as Peder Munk had done in May 1590.

The last week in July was occupied by the aftermath of an attack on Holyrood Palace by the Earl of Bothwell which they recorded in a Latin journal of their embassy. James VI had to explain the circumstances of Bothwell's appearance at Holyrood to them in a meeting with the Privy Council in the Tolbooth. They left the Scottish court on 6 August 1593, escorted to Leith by the queen and the royal councillors. A few weeks later a lion arrived from Denmark as a present from Christian IV with a German lion-keeper, Wilhelm Fröhlich.

=== Baptism of Prince Henry ===
Bille returned to Scotland in 1594 with Christian Barnekow for the baptism of Prince Henry at Stirling Castle. It had been rumoured that Manderup Parsberg, one of the four Regents of Denmark would attend. Bille and Barnekow brought gold necklaces each worth 500 French crowns as gifts for the queen and prince. James VI gave them gold chains worth 400 crowns.

=== June 1596 ===
In 1596 Bille was again sent as ambassador to Scotland. After his ship dropped him near Tynemouth in England by mistake, he arrived at Dunbar on 10 June. The ambassadors had been expected in May when their presents of diplomatic gifts were ready prepared. Bille invited Anna of Denmark and her husband to the coronation of Christian IV, but Anna was pregnant, and the diplomats Lord Ogilvy and Peter Young were sent instead. James declined the invitation giving reasons of state and his wife's pregnancy, that she could not herself "bear the tossing of a voyage and sea-sickness" or "separation from her husband at such a time." The English ambassador in Edinburgh Robert Bowes heard that he had discussed James VI's plans for a Protestant league against Spain. Bille sailed back to Denmark on 26 June.

== Later life and death ==
He died in 1629 and was buried at Helsingør.

== Marriage and family ==
He married Rigborg Lindenov in 1597. Their children included:

- Jens Bille (1599–1645)
- Rigborg Bille (1600–1648)
- Hans Bille (1601–1672), married secondly Beate Henriksdatter Gøye, sister of Anne Gøye, and was the father of Steen Andersen Bille
