= Steen Ottesen Brahe (landowner) =

Danish landowner (1547–1620)

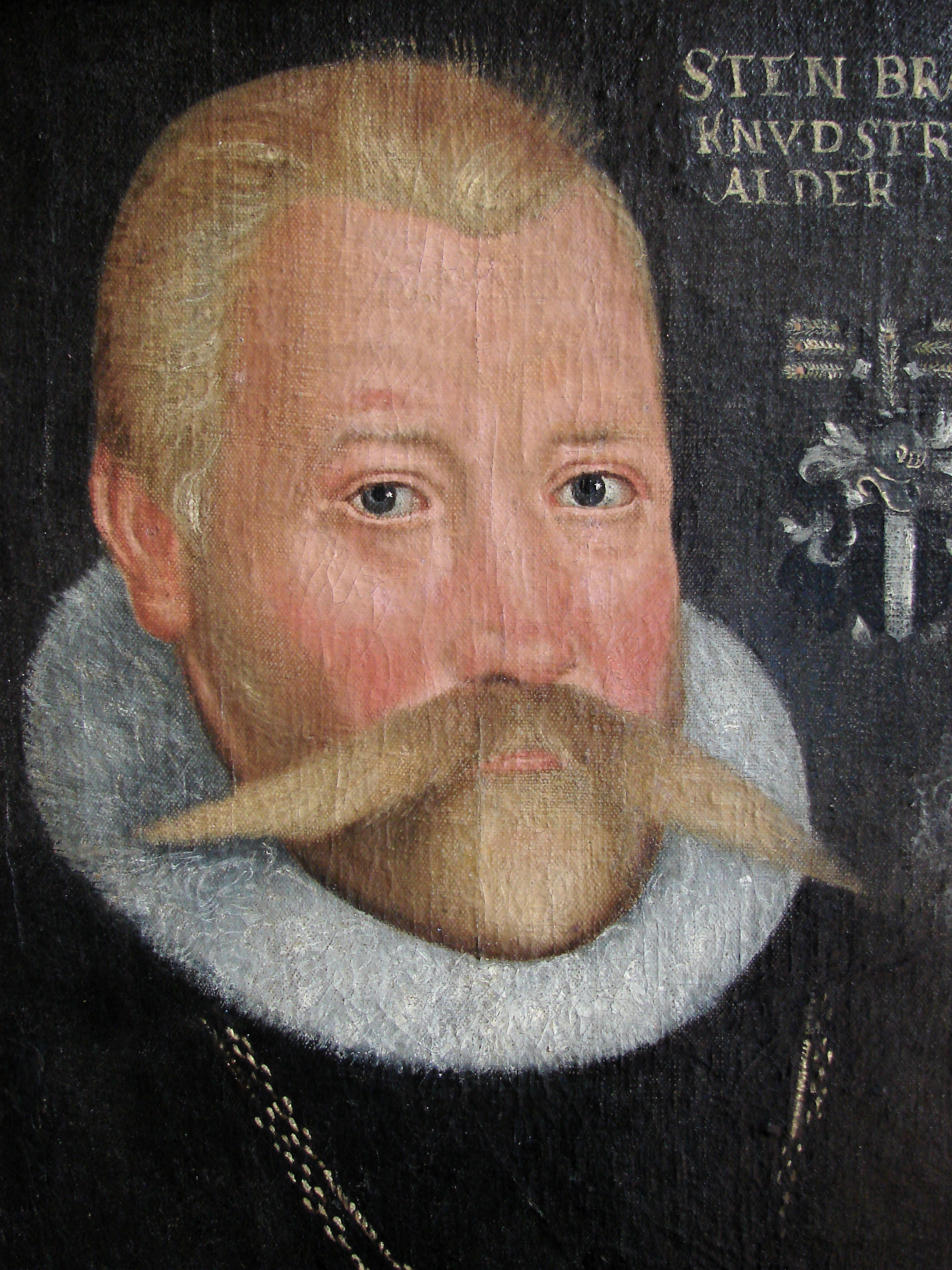
- Born: 21 December 1547; Gladsaxehus, Scania
- Died: 11 April 1620 (aged 72); Kalundborg Castle, Denmark
- Occupations: Statesman and landowner

Steen Ottesen Brahe (21 December 1547 – 11 April 1620) was a Danish privy counsellor and landowner.

== Early life and guidance ==
Brahe was born on 21 December 1547 at Gladsaxehus in Scania, the son of Otte Thygesen Brahe of Knudstrup (1518–1571) and Beate Clausdatter Bille (1526–1605). He was the younger brother of Tycho Brahe. He went to school in Aarhus and Aalborg and was then trained in court life in Jensen Rosensparre's household. He then visited count Günther of Schwarzburg and later followed him to Denmark and Hungary.

== Marriage of Anne of Denmark and James VI of Scotland ==
In 1589 he was appointed Master of Household or Chamberlain to Anne of Denmark, who was betrothed to James VI of Scotland. Brahe and the queen's servants set sail with the Admiral Peder Munk for Scotland. The wind drove them to stay on the coast of Norway. James VI joined them at Oslo. On 15 December 1589 James VI decided to reward Brahe and Axel Gyldenstierne for their good service in attending Anne of Denmark and organising the reception and lodging of his retinue with a gift of silver plate. Brahe was given a basin, a laver, six cups with covers, and a salt. The cupboard of silver had been a gift from Queen Elizabeth. Brahe returned with Steen Bille to Copenhagen. Brahe sailed with Anne and James to Scotland and attended her coronation on 17 May 1590.

Steen Brahe came to London with Christian IV in June 1606, and King James gave him a gift of silver gilt plate.

== Property ==
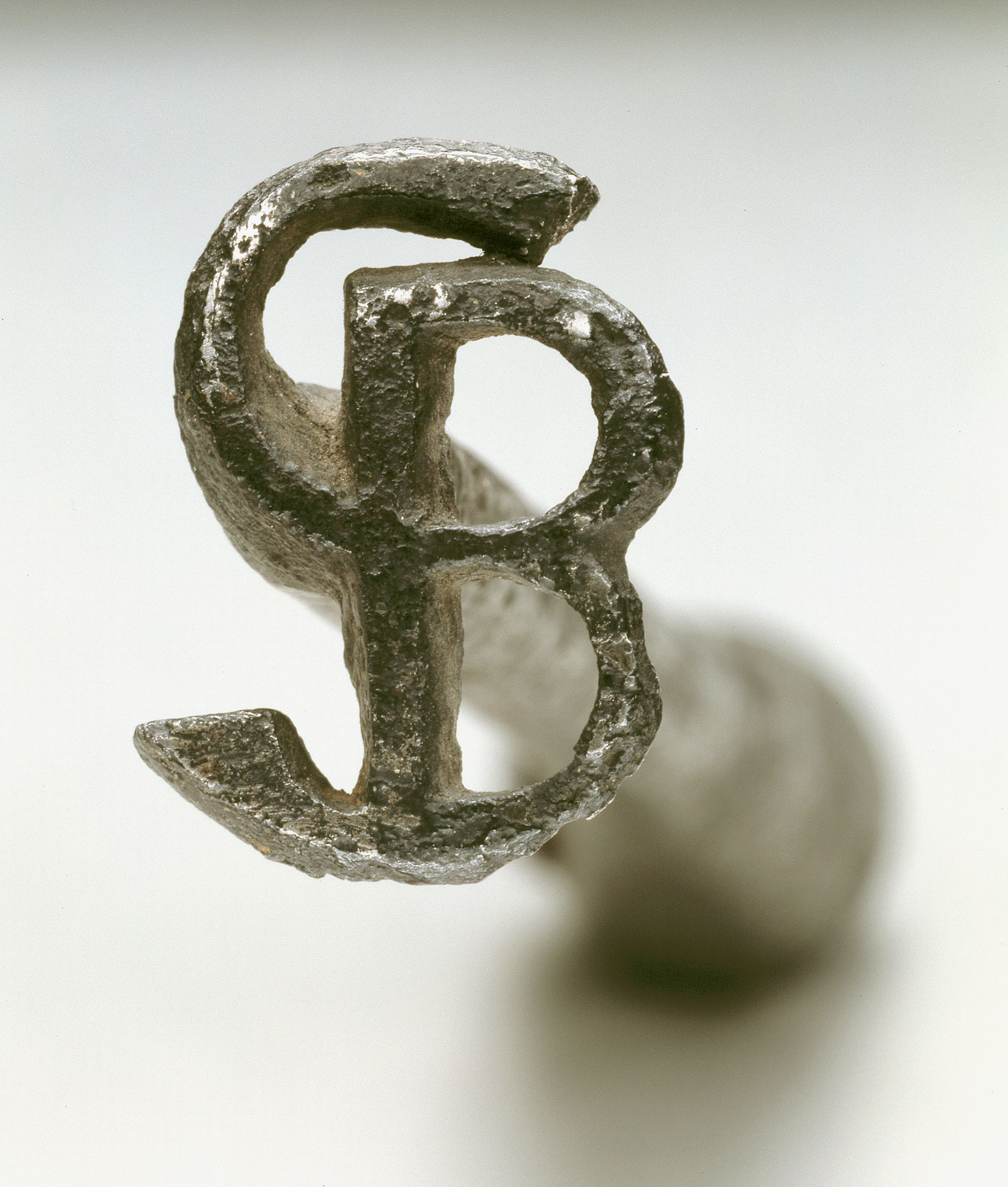
A branding iron with Steen Brahe's initials used for the branding of cattle, found on the Næsbyholm estate.

Brahe was a major landowner. He inherited half of Knudstrup after his father and bought the other half from his brother in 1594. He acquired Næsbyholm at Sorø and a house in Copenhagen ("Sigbrits Gård") through the marriage with his first wife. He constructed a new main building in 1585 but abandoned the house after she died in labour shortly after its completion. His second wife brought Barritskov and Bradskov into the marriage. He also carried out a comprehensive rebuilding of the main building at Barritskov. In 1581, he purchased Bregentved. He also inherited Tersløsegaard on Zealand (circa 1604), Hvedholm on Funen (1611) and Engelsholm in Jutland (1615).

== Personal life ==
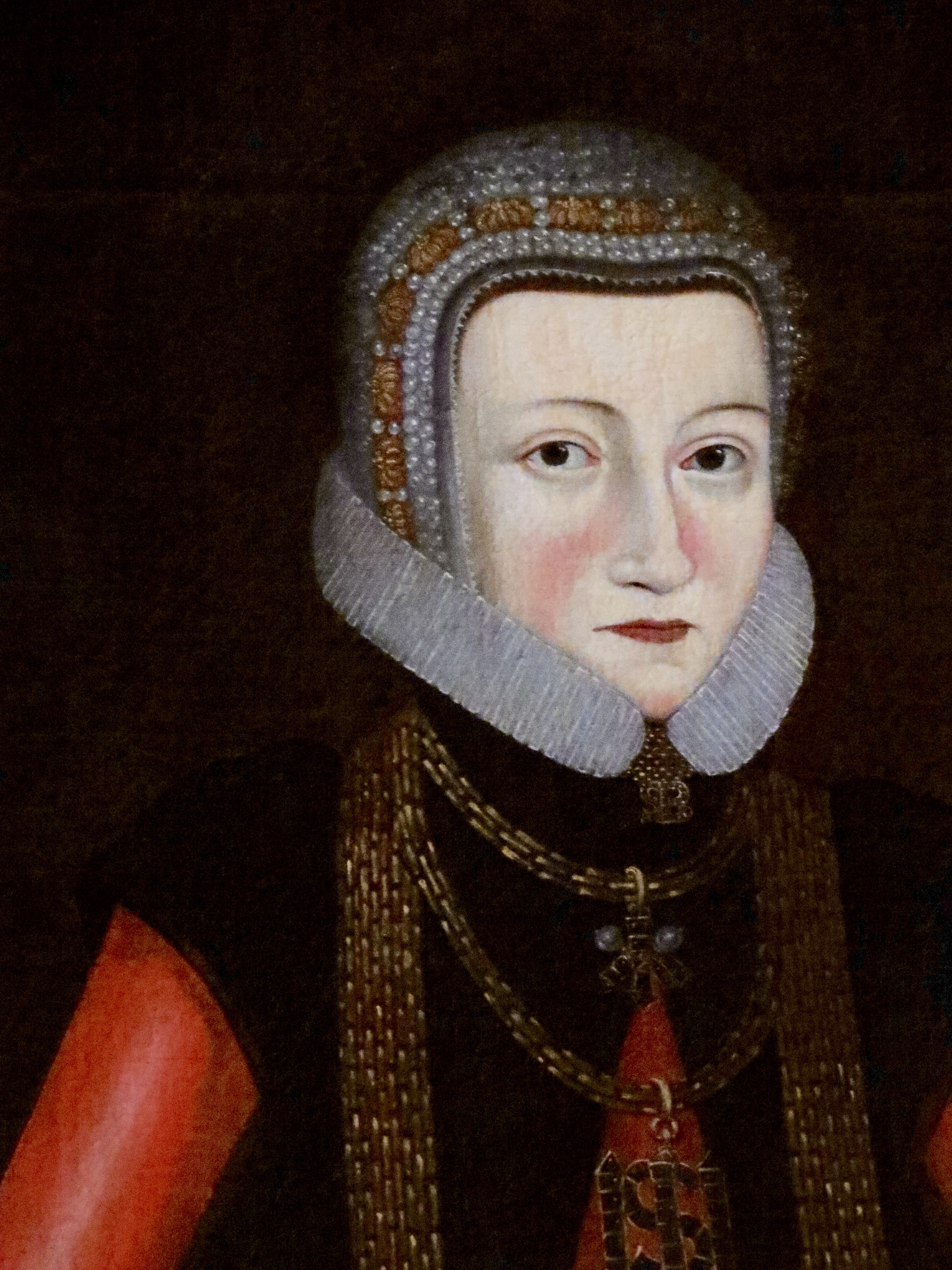
Birgitte Rosenkrantz Ottesdatter (1555–1588), detail

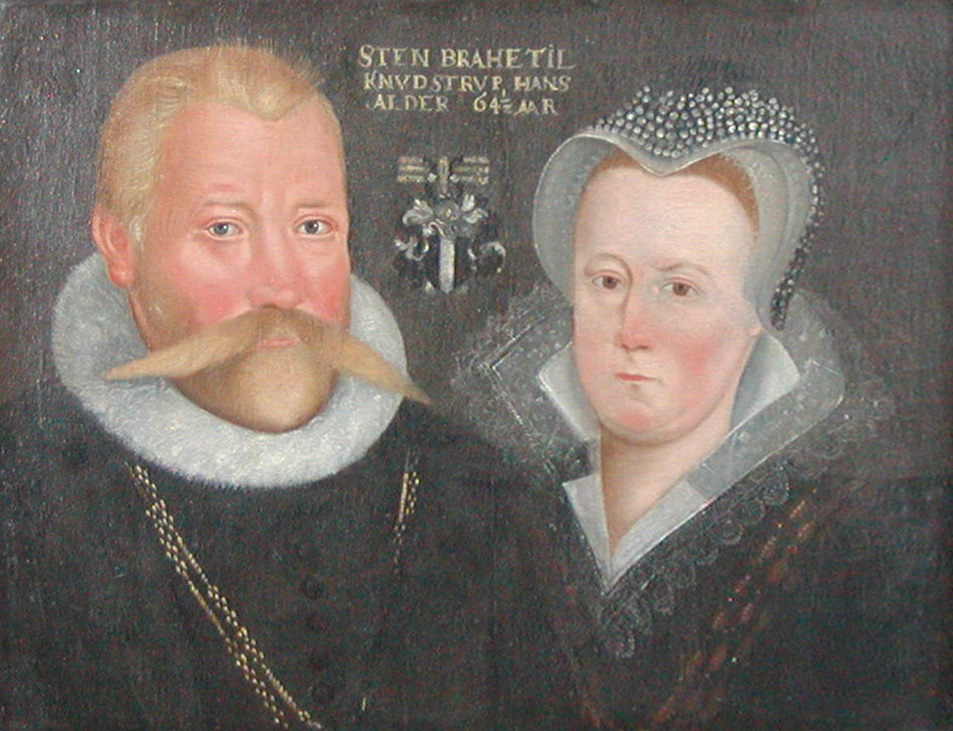
Steen Brahe and Sophie Rostrup Jørgensdatter, 1610

Brahe married three times. His first wife was Birgitte Rosenkrantz (1555–1588), a daughter of Otte Rosenkrantz and Ide Gjøe. They married on 18 September 1575 and had seven children.

His second wife was Kirstine Holck (1558–1599), a daughter of Hans Holck and Margrethe Rotfeldt and the widow of Hans Krafse til Egholm (died c. 1587). They were married on 6 September 1590 and had two children.

His children included Otte Steensen Brahe of Næsbyholm (died in 1651), Jørgen Steensen Brahe of Hvedholm (died 1661) and Tyge Brahe.

His third wife was Sophie Rostrup Jørgensdatter. They had no children.

Brahe died in 1620 at Kalundborg Castle and was buried at Kågeröd Church in Scania.
