= Gøye family =

Danish noble family (dissolved 1698)

Gøye Giøde, Giøe, Gjøe, Gye, Gyø, Gøyde
- Danish noble family
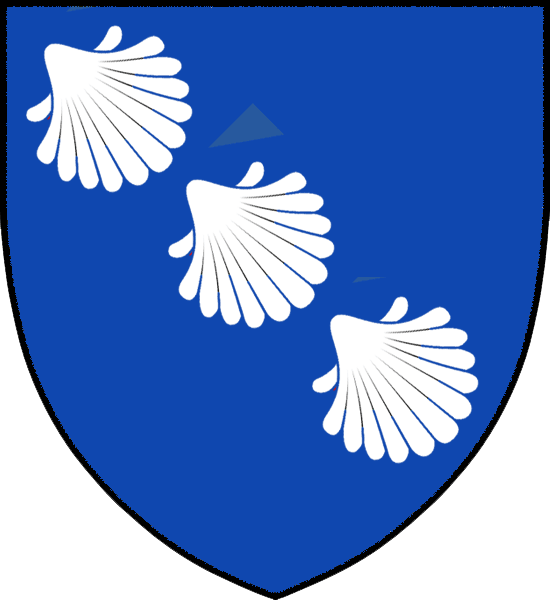
- Gøye family coat ofarms, with the blazon: Azure, three escallops bendwise in bend argent
- Origin: Lolland, Denmark
- Final head: Marcus Gøye
- Connected families: Brahe; Gyldenstierne; Rosenkrantz; Thott; Trolle; Oxe
- Dissolution: 1698

The Gøye (Note: Also written as Giøde, Giøe, Gjøe, Gye, Gyø, and Gøyde.) family was a Danish noble family. The family was founded on the island of Lolland in Denmark in the late 14th century.

== History ==
The Gøye family was founded on the island of Lolland in Denmark. The family started with three lines of unknown relations, including a family that did not take a surname and a family that also went by the name Krag. The earliest known ancestor of the third line is Staverskov, a knight, who used the family's coat of arms in 1363. Staverskov had a son named Jens Staverskov, and likely had a second son named Mogens, who is only documented by his son's patronymic. Jens' line of the family ended in 1608 with Mogens Gøye, who married his distant cousin—descended of Mogens—Helvig Mogensdatter Gøye.

Members of the cadet branch of the Staverskov line served in prominent political positions in Denmark from the 1400s through its end in 1698.

== Notable members ==
- Anne Gøye (1609–1681), Danish noblewoman and book collector
- Birgitte Gøye (1511–1574), Danish county administrator
- Christoffer Gøye (c. 1514–1584), Danish nobleman and landowner
- Eskil Gøye (died 1506), Danish nobleman
- Marcus Gøye (1635–1698), Danish nobleman, courtier, and diplomat
- Mette Gøye (1599–1664), Danish noblewoman, writer, and translator
- Mogens Gøye (c. 1470–1544), Danish statesman

== Family tree ==
Female Male

Staverskov line of the Gøye family

Staverskov (fl. 1363)
Jens Staverskov (fl. 1356–1390)	[Mogens]
Axel Mogensen Gøye (1367–c. 1410)
Mogens Axelsen Gøye (fl. 1411–1450)	Ide Eskilsdatter Falk
Eskil Gøye (d. 1506)
Mogens Gøye (c. 1470–1544)	Henrik Gøye (d. 1533)
Helvig Mogensdatter Gøye (d. 1597)	Axel Gøye (d. 1537)	Eskil Gøye (d. 1560)	Albrecht Gøye (d. 1558)	Anne Ottesdatter Rosenkrantz (1522–1589)	Pernille Gøye (1506–1552)	Sofie Gøye (d. 1537)	Mette Gøye (d. c. 1537)	Elline Gøye (c. 1510–1563)	Birgitte Gøye (c. 1511–1574)	Christoffer Gøye (c. 1514–1584)	Falk Gøye (d. 1554)	Ide Trudsdatter Ulfstand (d. c. 1600)	Eskil Gøye (d. 1573)	Sibylle Mogesdatter Gyldenstierne (1540–1611)
Mogens Gøye (1547–1608)	Margrethe Gøye (d. 1594)	Pernille Gøye (1550-1589)	Mogens Gøye (d. 1615)	Hilleborg Eilersdatter Krafse	Margrethe Gøye (d. c. 1613)	Mette Gøye (d. 1584)	Falk Gøye	Karen Iversdatter Krabbe	Henrik Gøye (1562–1611)	Birgitte Brahe (1579–1619)
Christoffer Gøye (1584–1652)	Falk Gøye (d. 1623)	Falk Gøye (c. 1597–1643)	Helvig Gøye (d. 1622)	Mette Gøye (1599–1664)	Eskil Gøye (1600–1647)	Falk Gøye (1602–1653)	Otte Gøye (1604–1642)	Anne Gøye (1609–1681)
Susanne Gøye (1634–1683)	Marcus Gøye (1635–1698)	Mogens Gøye (1637–1683)	Henrik Gøye (d. 1657)

== Buildings owned by the family ==
- Brahesborg
- Bregentved
- Fuglsang (manor)
- Gisselfeld
- Herlufsholm School
- Højbygård
- Kragerup
- Krenkerup
- Lungholm
- Møntergården
- No. 2 Niels Hemmingsens Gade
- Orebygaard
- Torbenfeldt
- Turebyholm

== See also ==
- Marcus Gjøe Rosenkrantz (1762–1838), Norwegian politician
- Peter Marcus Gjøe Rosenkrantz Johnsen (1857–1929), Norwegian journalist and author
