= Jens Billes visebog =

Jens Billes visebog (lit. 'Jens Bille's songbook') is the second oldest major collection of Danish poetry, after the Heart Book. It was compiled in the second half of the 1550s.

The collection has also been called Jens Billes håndskrift (lit. 'Jens Bille's Manuscript'), Jens Billes poesiebog (lit. 'Jens Bille's Book of Poetry'), and erroneously Steen Billes Haandskrift. Today, the is book held by the Danish National Archives, having been acquired as part of Karen Brahe's library (E I,2).

== Format ==
The manuscript is a small quarto in size (20×14½cm), paper, with 162 folios, all with the same watermark. The manuscript contains 87 poems written in around 17 different hands of which the most important are those of Jens Bille (1531–75), Sten Clausen Bille, and Anne Skave; they are numbered in pencil by Svend Grundtvig. It is from Jens Bille, who named himself in the manuscript as its owner, that the manuscript takes its modern name. Poems 1-86 were written in the period 1555–89, and poem 87, on the death of Frederick II of Denmark, in 1589.

== Contents ==
The book contains some of our earliest attestations of Scandinavian ballads, such as Elvehøj. Many of the texts it contains are edited in Danmarks gamle Folkeviser.

Jens Billes Visebog har karakter af en typisk familievisebog. Adskillige genrer er repræsenteret i bogen: ridderviser, skæmteviser, historiske viser, aktuelle viser, salmer, adelslyrik - og muligvis nogle afskrevne skillingstryk. Endvidere taler meget for, at en del mundtlig, sungen tradition findes nedskrevet her.

Jens Billes visebog has the character of a typical family song-book. Several genres are represented in the book: songs of knights, historical songs, songs about contemporary events, hymns, aristocratic lyrics, and possibly some copied chapbooks. Moreover, there is a good case that a part of the sung oral tradition is found written down here.

— Rita Pedersen

== History ==
How the manuscript came into Karen Brahe's library is not clear, but it is likely to have been through inheritance; Karen Brahe inherited a large part of her library from her maternal grandfather's sister, the scholar Anne Gøye. Anne's sister was married to a grandson of Jens Bille and one of her brothers was married to a granddaughter of Jens Bille.

== External links and sources ==
- contents list
- Kroman, E., 'Jens Billes Visebog', Danske Studier (1923), 170–79. https://web.archive.org/web/20130824064038/http://danskestudier.dk/materiale/1923.pdf
- Thuesen, Karen, 'Til Jens Billes Visebog', Acta Philologica Scandinavica, 31 (1976), 58-69
