= Per Brahe =

Per Brahe may refer to:

- Count Per Brahe the Elder (1520–1590), Swedish statesman
- Count Per Brahe the Younger (1602–1680), Swedish soldier and statesman
- The Swedish steamer ferry Per Brahe, wrecked in 1918 (see John Bauer (illustrator))
