= Magnus Brahe =

Magnus Brahe may refer to:

- Magnus Brahe (1564–1633), Swedish nobleman
- Magnus Fredrik Brahe (1756–1826), Lord Marshal (Sweden)
- Magnus Brahe (1790–1844), Swedish statesman and soldier
- Magnus Per Brahe (1849–1930), Knight of the Royal Order of the Seraphim
