= Middelfart Crown =

16th-century crown discovered in Denmark

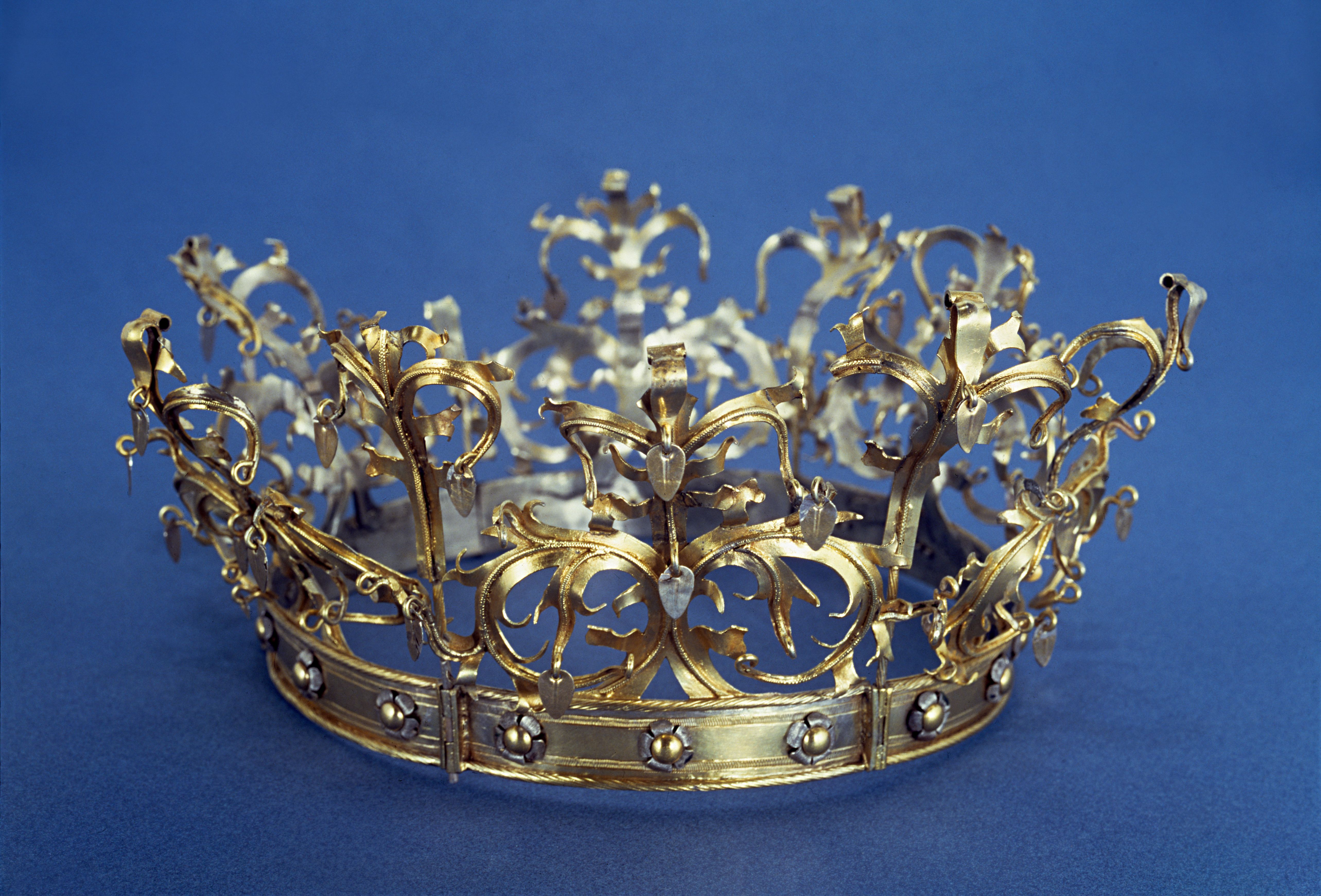
The Middelfart Crown

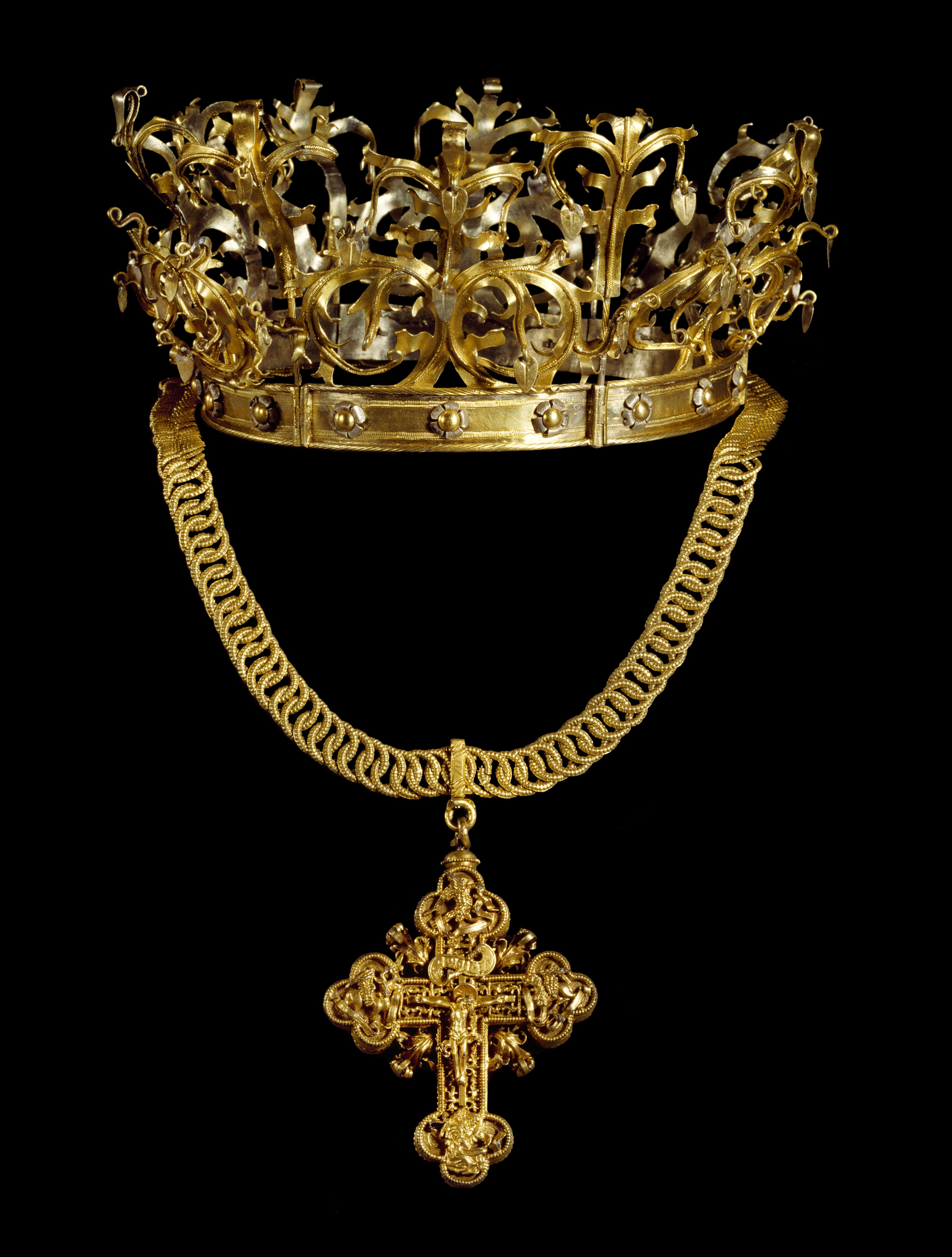
The Middelfart Crown and the necklace with which it was found

The Middelfart Crown (Danish: Middelfartkronen) is an early 16th-century bridal crown discovered in 1933 during construction work beneath the central marketplace in Middelfart, Denmark. It is now on display in the National Museum of Denmark.

== Discovery ==
The Middelfart Crown was discovered in 1933 when the cobbling of the central marketplace in Middelfart was being renewed. It was located in a small stone-clad cavity, possibly a former fireplace. It was found together with a necklace with a pendant reliquary cross. The cavity of the reliquary cross was empty.

== Description ==
The crown is made of gilded silver with traces of enamel. It has a maximum diameter of 26 cm (10 in), measures 11 cm (4.3 in) tall, and has an original weight of approximately 430 g (15 oz). The circlet consists of six segments, each of which are decorated with three five-leaved rosettes with traces of enamel. The 12 points, of which three are missing, are shaped like lilies. They were originally decorated with heart-shaped leaves.

== Interpretation ==
It is believed that it has been worn by a St. May figure in the local St. Nicolas' Church and loaned out to brides.
