= Holger Rosenkrantz =

Danish nobleman (1574–1642)

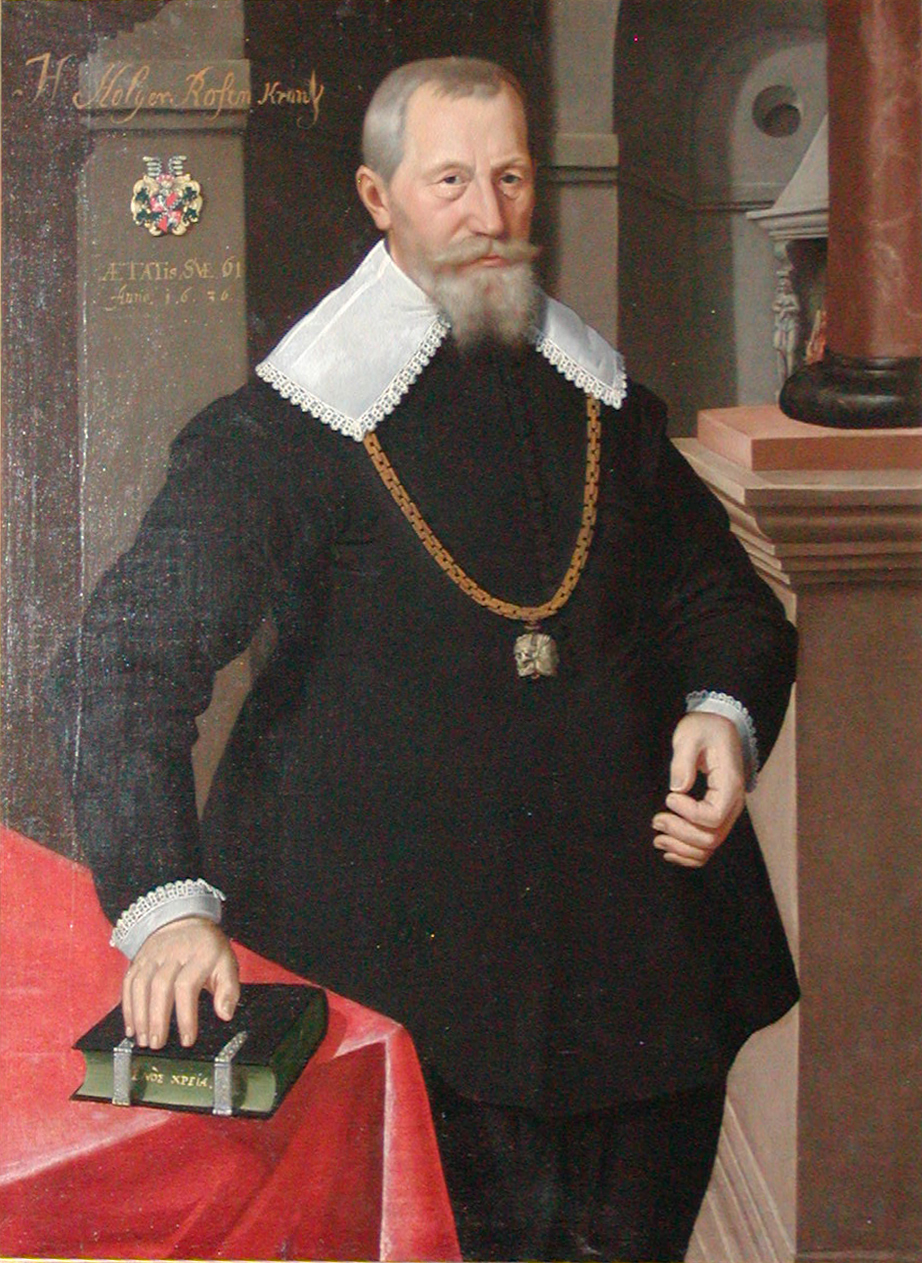
- 1635 painting of Rosenkrantz by Johan Thim
- Born: 14 December 1574; Kalø Castle, Jutland, Denmark
- Died: 28 October 1642 (aged 67); Copenhagen, Denmark
- Noble family: Rosenkrantz
- Spouse: Sophie Axelsdatter Brahe

Holger Rosenkrantz (14 December 1574 – 28 October 1642) was a Danish nobleman and member of the Danish Council of State. After a few years of joining the council, he chose to retire to his estates and pursue theological writing. European theologians in the 17th century considered him to be one of the wisest Danes and gave him the nickname the Learned.

== Early life and education ==
Born in eastern Jutland to the Rosenkrantz family, he was the third child of Jørgen Rosenkrantz and Dorthe Lange. He was taught by a private tutor until the age of fourteen. In 1590, he enrolled at the University of Rostock in Germany, where he met his tutor Daniel Cramer (1568–1637). Holger's letters home described his enthusiasm for Aristotelianism and Gnesio-Lutheranism, which caused concern from his father, who firmly supported Melanchthonian Lutheranism. In late 1592, accompanied by Cramer, he began his studies at the University of Wittenberg.

== Career ==
=== Privy Council ===
Rosenkrantz inherited the role within the King's Council upon the death of his father in 1596. He was a key figure in shaping Danish foreign policy between 1617 and 1627. He maintained an interest in theology throughout his tenure in government service and initially supported Hans Poulsen Resen's endeavours to enforce religious uniformity. During the reign of Christian IV, Rosenkrantz led a church movement, influenced by the piety and practical spirituality in works by Johann Arndt. Initially, he supported Hans Poulsen Resen's efforts to enforce religious uniformity; but experienced a spiritual crisis around 1620, leading him to temporarily withdraw from public life. Similar to Arndt in Germany, Rosenkrantz grew disillusioned with doctrinal disputes.

=== Theological writing ===
In 1598, he married Sophie Axelsdatter Brahe (1578–1646) and they had 13 children, eight of whom survived to adulthood. Upon his father's death, Rosenkrantz inherited Rosenholm Castle, and following his mother's death in 1613, he inherited Skaføgård. In 1627, he withdrew from political life and devoted himself to theological writing. His commitment to theology and education became so ardent that he relinquished his fief and retired to Rosenholm, where he fully immersed himself in his studies and Christian life. He maintained correspondence with theologians across Europe.

He died on 28 October 1642.
