= Tycho Brahe (disambiguation) =

Tycho Brahe (1546–1601) was an influential Danish astronomer.

Tycho Brahe may also refer to:

- Tycho Brahe (Martian crater)
- Tycho Brahe Planetarium, a planetarium in Copenhagen, Denmark
- HEAT 1X Tycho Brahe, the first amateur, suborbital crewed spacecraft
- Tycho Brahé, a 1993 album by Lightwave
- Jerry Holkins or Tycho Brahe, writer of Penny Arcade
- MF Tycho Brahe, a Danish train and car ferry

== See also ==
- Tycho (disambiguation)
