= Karen Brahe =

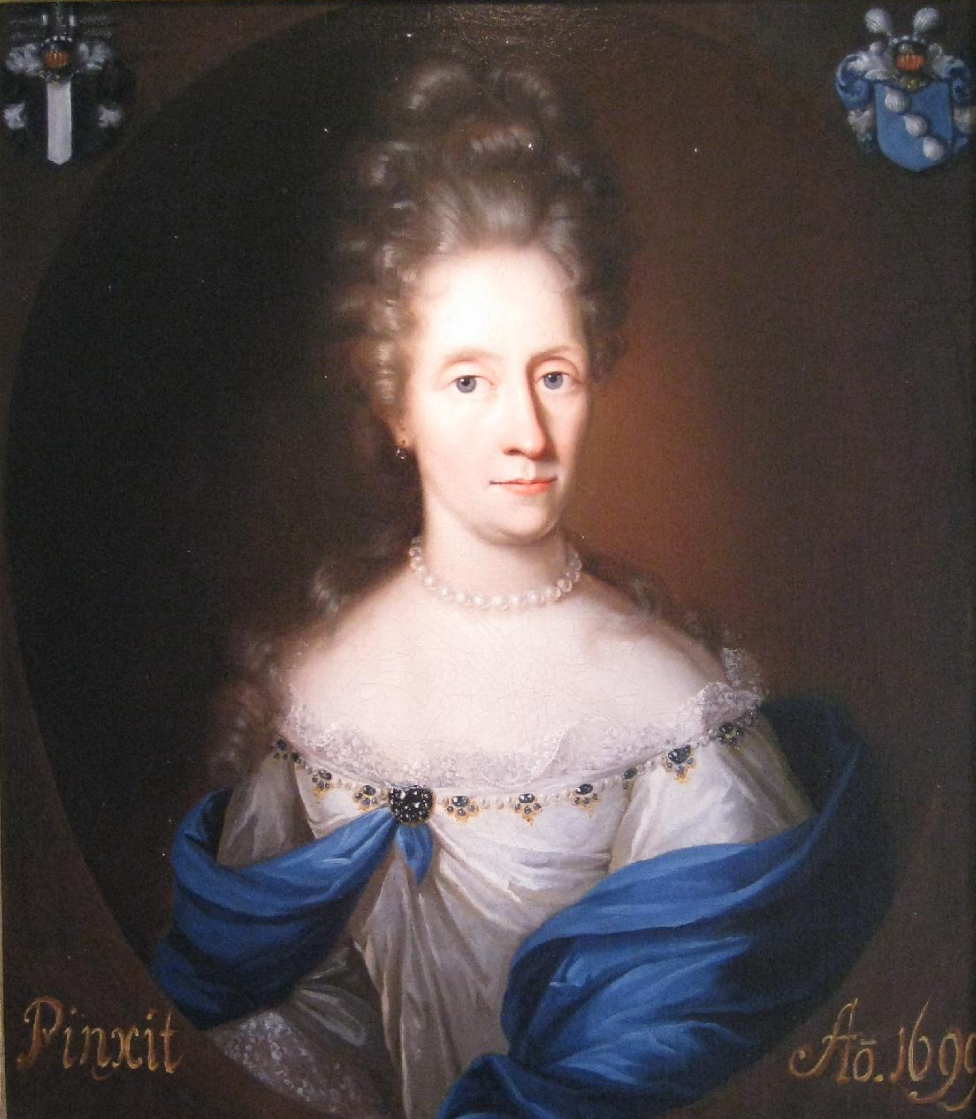
- Painting of Karen Brahe by Jacob Coning, framed by the coats of arms of the Brahe and Gøye families, 1699
- Born: 1 December 1657; Næsbyholm, Denmark
- Died: 27 September 1736 (aged 78); Østrupgård, Odense Kommune, Denmark

Karen Brahe (1 December 1657 – 27 September 1736) was a Danish noblewoman, book collector, and letter writer.

== Biography ==
The third child of six born to Preben Brahe of Hvedholm, Engelsholm og Østrupgård (1627–1708) and Susanne Gøye (1634–83) and a relative of Jens Bille, Karen Brahe grew up reading, being taught by, amongst others, her mother and grandmother Karen Bille.

She became an able administrator of her father's estate, which she ran from her mother's death until her father himself died. After her father's death, she moved to Østrupgård and became the estate owner there until her death. She was a diligent scholar and an avid letter writer. Her surviving letters cover a wide range of topics, from administration to literature to gossip. She never married.

== Book collection ==
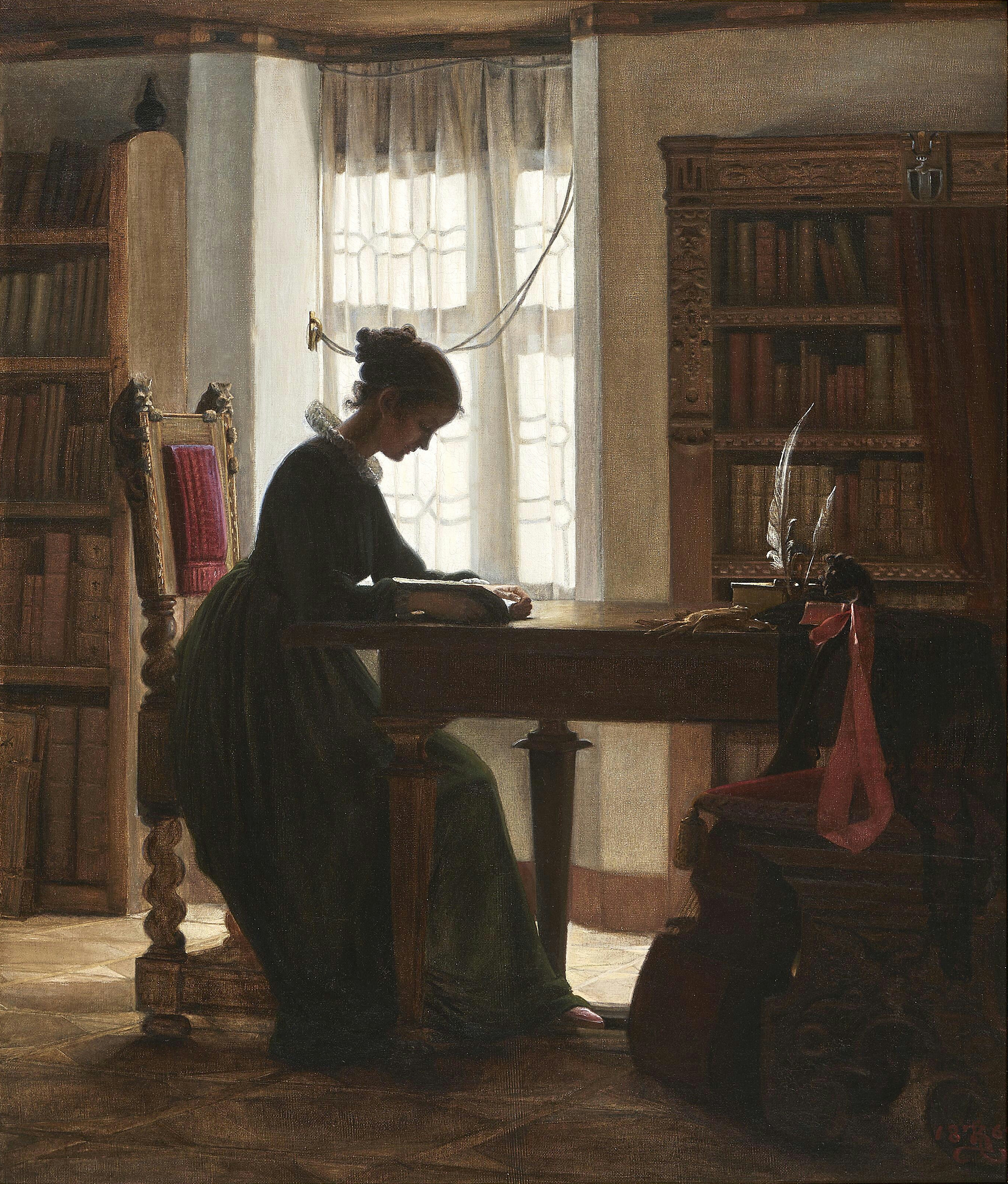
Kristian Zahrtmann's 1869 painting En ung Pige, which depicts Brahe as a young woman

In 1681, she inherited the library of her maternal grandfather's sister, Anne Gøye, who had been close to her mother and grandmother. Gøye's library contained around 1000 printed books and 100 manuscripts, and Brahe went on to increase it.

Her main scholarly interest was theology, which accounts for more than half of her books. Another interest was history, primarily Denmark's, and this is the subject of about a quarter of the books. The last quarter contains more practical books such as legal collections, medical books, anatomical works, grease-stained cookbooks, and textbooks. There were also literary texts, which Anne Gøye's sister Anne Birgitte had collected. Among the famous books held by the library are the ballad collections Karen Brahes Folio (shelfmark E I,1) and Jens Billes visebog (E I,2); the only manuscript of Leonora Christina Ulfeldt's Heltinders Pryd (C V,1); and a rare first edition of Margrethe Lasson's Den beklædte sandhed.

== Karen Brahe's library ==
On 8 November 1716, she founded the Odense adelige jomfrukloster, a Lutheran collegiate foundation for unmarried noblewomen (now part of St. Catherine's Priory, Roskilde), which received royal confirmation on March 15, 1717. She bequeathed to it her library, now known as Karen Brahe's Library. The books were to belong to the monastery in perpetuity for the use of the young ladies there, but she also opened access to learning for other women.

The library is the only private Danish library from the seventeenth century which survived fairly intact. Today it contains around 3,400 printed books, about 400 bound manuscripts, and another 600 or so unbound handwritten documents.

The monastery's last residents moved out in 1970. In 1987, the Karen Brahe Society was founded with the aim of establishing a women's cultural center in the monastery buildings, now owned by Odense Municipality.

== Sources ==
- karenbrahe.dk
- Nordisk familjebok
- Dansk kvindebiografisk leksikon
- Anne Riising, Katalog over Karen Brahes Bibliothek i Landsarkivet for Fyn: Håndskriftsamlingen (København, 1956)
- "Karen Brahe", Dansk Biografisk Leksikon
