= Gladsaxehus =

Ruined castle in Sweden

Coordinates: 55°33′42″N 14°17′18″E

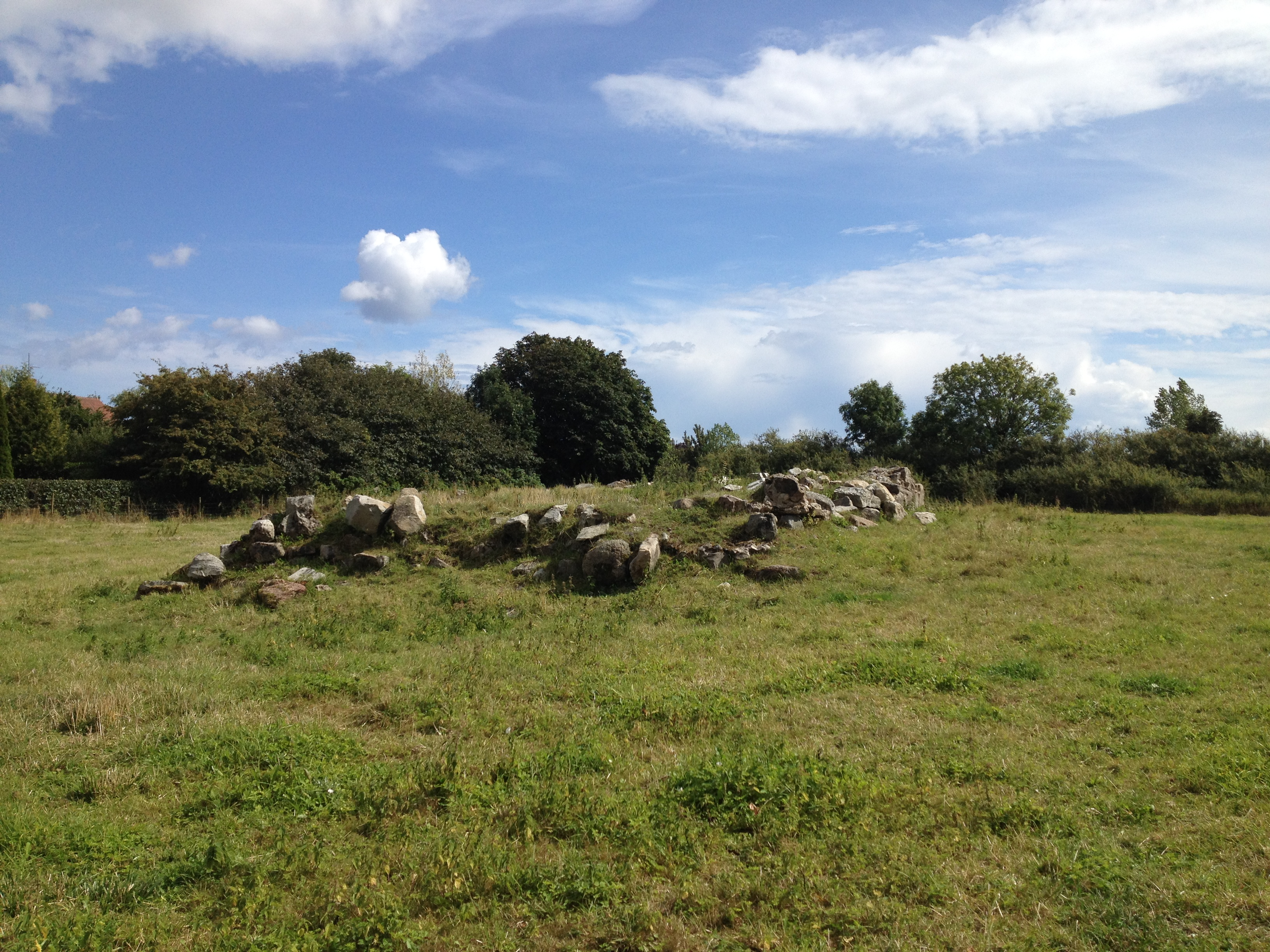
Ruins

Gladsaxehus (Swedish: Gladsax hus; earlier Gladsaxehus, also Glathsax or Glatzsax) is a ruined castle in Gladsax parish, in the Simrishamn Municipality of Skåne in south-eastern Sweden. The ruins lie immediately to the east of the church and cemetery of Gladsax.

== History ==
The first written mention of the property is a charter issued in 1322 by Archbishop Esger Juul affirming the ruling by Archbishop Eskil in the 12th century that four churches were subordinate to the monastery at Tommarp, amongst which was "ecclesiam sancti Jacobi in Glathsyas".

In her will dated 11 August 1398, Ide Pedersdatter Falk, widow of Torkil Nielsen Bing, bequeathed her manor at Gladsax, together with a large fortune in property and cash, to be the endowment and seat of a planned Dominican nunnery. She appointed her personal friend, Queen Margaret, to be her executor. However, after Ide Falk's death in 1399, the queen and Bishop Peder of Roskilde realised the strategic importance of the location as a counterweight to the archbishop's castles at Åhus, four miles to the north, and Hammershus on Bornholm. They succeeded in obtaining the Pope's permission to transfer the monastic endowment to Gavnø on Zealand.

The manor then became the royal fief of Gladsaxehus, together with the parish of Gladsax, the settlement of Simrishamn and significant portions of Albo Hundred as the outlying land of the fief. Gladsax county came to be considered one of the primary counties of Skåne.

For about 200 years, the lords of Gladsax resided at Gladsaxehus. They included Eskil Mogensen Göye (enfeoffed in 1471, died 1476), Jens Holgersen Ulfstand (probably enfeoffed 1476, died 1486) and Sten Basse Bille (enfeoffed 1490, died 1506). Gladsax was an independent fief until 1621, when it became part of Kristianstad County, and the king endowed Jacob Beck, priest of Gladsax, Bosjökloster, and Vapnö, with the castle and most of the land.

In the 1770s, C. G. Hilfeling inventoried properties in Skåne on behalf of the king; at Gladsax he described the ruins of a stone walled castle with newer buildings to the west. (The "fishponds" he also mentions near the castle were probably part of a water-driven system for smelting silver from a local mine.) In 1844, C. G. Brunius, a professor at Lund University, visited the site. He made a plan, measuring the ruined stone building at about 10.4 by 8 metres (34 ft × 26 ft), with walls approximately 1.1 metres (3.6 ft) thick. One storey remained standing to a height of a couple of metres, with an arched door opening on the west side and arrow slits at each end; all of these had brick framing. Defensive ditches could still be made out to the east and north. According to local legend, the ruin had been revealed when a hill near the church was levelled. Stone was probably taken from the ruin when the church was enlarged in 1857.

== Excavation ==
All that remains of the castle today are the foundations of the stone building. A trial excavation at the site performed in 1954 by Gustaf Åberg found traces of a ditch or moat approximately 1.5 metres (4.9 ft) deep and a defensive wall approximately 0.9 to 1 metre (3.0 to 3.3 ft) thick. A second trial excavation in 1974 revealed a debris field 1 metre (3.3 ft) deep immediately east of the castle, which included both medieval building materials and finds from later periods, as well as excavated areas that may have been ponds.
