= Steen Ottesen Brahe (military officer) =

Danish military officer and landowner (1623–1677)

Steen Ottesen Brahe (28 August 1623 – 26 February 1677) was a Danish military officer and landowner.

== Early life ==
Steen Brahe was born on 28 August 1623 at Hagenskov Manor, son of the privy counsellor Jørgen Brahe (1585–1661) and Anne Gyldenstierne (1596–1677). He was the older brother of Preben Brahe (1627–1708).

In 1640, he enrolled at the University of Leiden, then continued his studies in Strasbourg in 1645. After his return to Denmark, he succeeded his father at Knutstorp (then Knudstrup) in Scania.

== Career ==
In 1653, he was appointed ritmester in the Scanian Company of the new national cavalry, but he was fired in 1657. He returned to service during the First and Second Dano-Swedish Wars. He was in 1658 sent to Lolland with a small group of men and was present at the Siege of Nakskov.

During the Dano-Swedish War, in 1658–60, together with Holger Vind, he served as General War Commissioner (generalkrigskommissær) and was thus responsible for payment of troops.

He was represented at the meeting of the estates of the realm (stændermødet) in Copenhagen in 1660 and was one of the Sovereignty Act of 1661.

The Treaty of Copenhagen had ceded Scania to Sweden. Brahe still settled at Knutstorp but without swearing loyalty to the Swedish king. During the Scanian War, in 1676, he went back into Danish service with the rank of colonel, and was put in charge of the new Scanian Dragoon Regiment and participated with honour in the assault on Karlshamn in October 1676. He was also responsible for organising the border defence in Blekinge. He had been appointed as county governor of Assens and Hindsgavl in January of that same year.

He died on 26 February 1677 at Kristianstad. A report in the Danish National Archives from 10th March 1677 states that he had been ill and that he died from Stockfluß ("Wan auch der Obrist Steen Brahe nach ausgestandener Krankheit und zwar am Stuckfluss gestorben..."). Brahe's dragoon regiment was then dissolved.

== Personal life ==
Brahe married Sophie Rosenkrantz, a daughter of Holger Rosenkrantz (1574–1642) and Sophie Brahe (1578–1646), on 6 September 1646.
