= Jørgen Brahe =

Jørgen Brahe may refer to:

- Jørgen Thygesen Brahe (1515–1565) of Tostrup in Scania, Danish holder of a Seignory
- Jørgen Ottesen Brahe (1553–1601) of Tostrup and Gundestrup in Scania, Danish holder of a Seignory
