= Skaføgård =

Manor house in Djursland, Denmark

Skaføgård Manor, Denmark
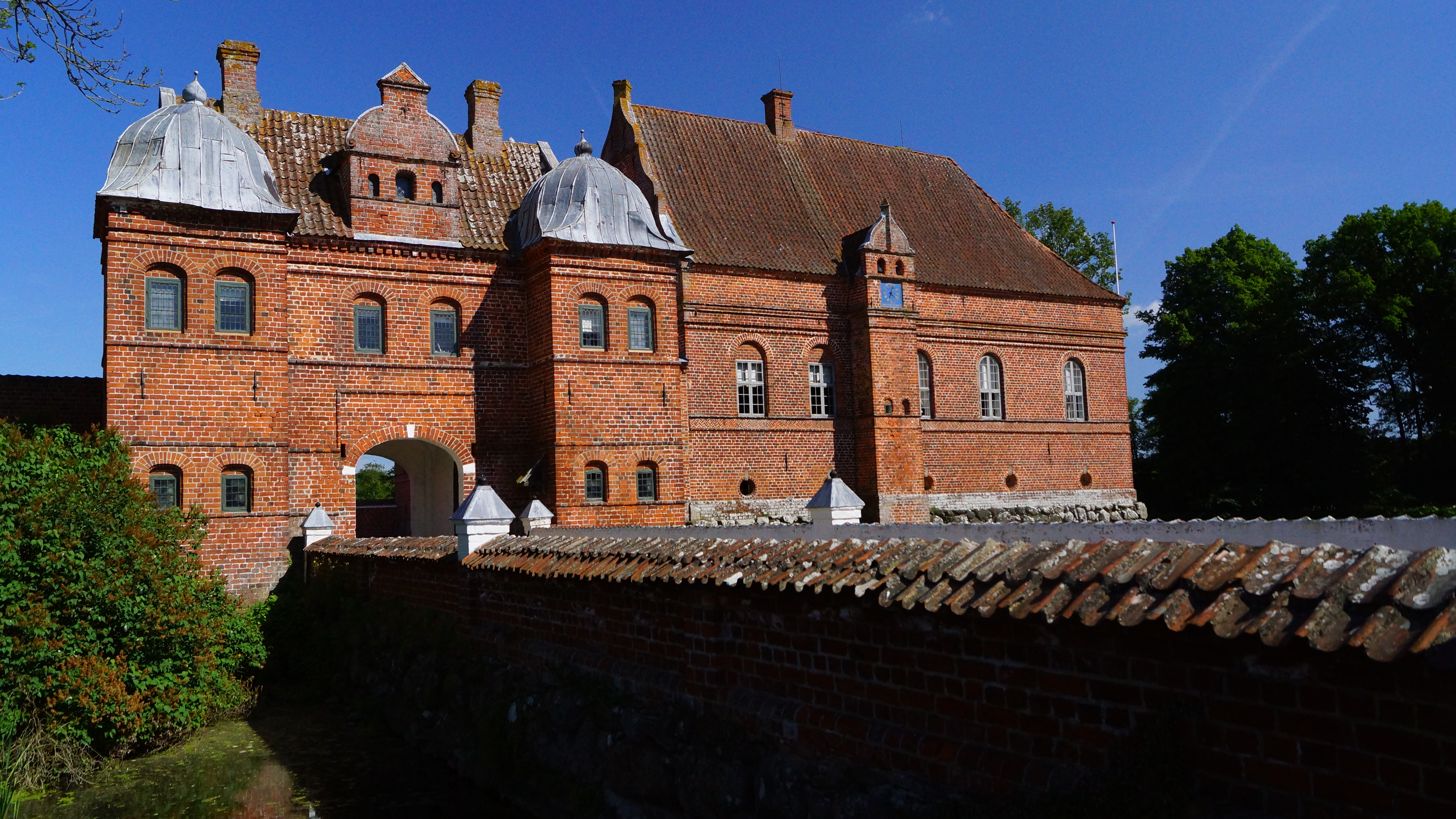
- Interactive map of the Skaføgård Manor, Denmark area

General information
- Architectural style: Renaissance
- Location: Syddjurs Municipality, Denmark
- Coordinates: 56°22′35″N 10°24′33″E
- Construction started: 1580
- Completed: 1582

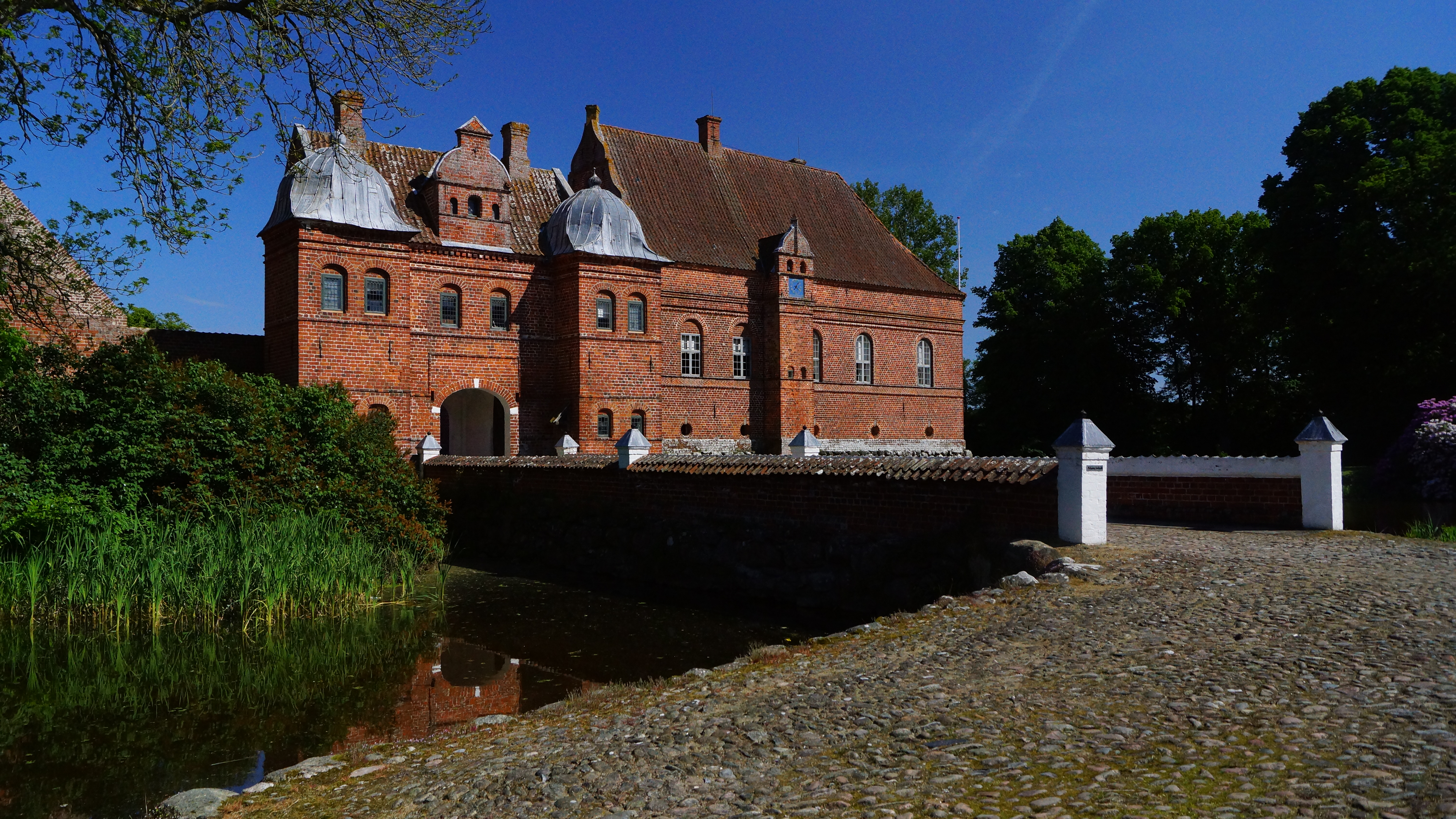
Bridge over the moat

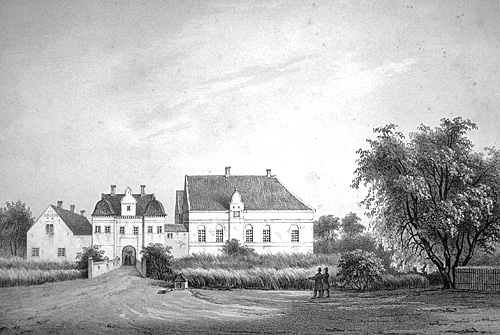
Skaføgaard by F. Richardt in Prospecter af danske Herregaarde, 1861

Skaføgård is a manor house in the parish of Hvilsager in Syddjurs Municipality in the eastern Jutland peninsula of Djursland, Denmark. It is not one of Denmark's largest manor-houses, but one of the best preserved. Inside there is an enormous oak closet carved by the Dutch carpenter Mikkel van Gronningen whose most famous work is the pulpit in Århus Cathedral. The closet covers 13 m^{2} (140 sq ft) of wall space and, in view of its rich detail, is considered to be one of the most outstanding examples of carved wooden Renaissance furniture in Northern Europe.

== History ==
Skaføgård was built around 1580 by Danish nobleman Jørgen Rosenkrantz (1523-1596) who had two sons: Otto Rosenkrantz and Holger Rosenkrantz (1574-1642). As soon as he was able, he built a manor for both of them: Skaføgård and Rosenholm in 1559. Unfortunately Otto died early, after which Skaføgård became a dower house for Jørgen's wife, Dorthe Lange, until her death in 1613. After this the estate was handed over to the son Holger. His son Gunde Rosenkrantz (1604-1675) had to sell it in 1647 because of poor finances. After that the estate often changed hands in the following century.

One of the later owners was Jacob Brønnum Scavenius Estrup (1825–1913) who acquired it in 1852. His descendants still own Skaføgård.

== Owners ==
- (1492–1503) Erik Ottesen Rosenkrantz
- (1503–1520) Holger Eriksen Rosenkrantz
- (1520–1542) Otte Holgersen Rosenkrantz
- (1542–1596) Jørgen Ottesen Rosenkrantz
- (1596–1613) Dorthe Lange (widow)
- (1613–1642) Holger Rosenkrantz "the learned"
- (1642–1647) Gunde Rosenkrantz
- (1647–1666) Steen Bille
- (1666–1681) Henrik Ditlev Holck
- (1681–1712) Mette Steensdatter Bille married Holck
- (1712–1749) Thomas Nicolaj Nielsen Behr
- (1749–1778) Niels Thomsen Behr
- (1778–1779) Niels Thomsen Behrs dødsbo
- (1779–1786) Poul Nielsen Behr
- (1786–1797) Anna Jørgensdatter Mørch married Behr
- (1797–1852) Jørgen Mørch Secher
- (1852–1907) Jacob Brønnum Scavenius Estrup
- (1907–1939) Jacob Estrup (son)
- (1939–1967) Niels Rudolph Estrup (nephew)
- (1967–1971) Hector Estrup / Vilhelm Estrup / Christian Estrup (Niels' 3 sons)
- (1971–2007) Hector Estrup
- (2007– ) Jacob Christen Estrup (son)
