= Beate Bille =

Beate Bille may refer to

- Beate Clausdatter Bille (1526–1605), Danish noblewoman and mother of Tycho Brahe
- Beate Bille (actress) (born 1976), Danish actress and a descendant of Beate Clausdatter Bille
