= Jens Bille =

Danish scribe (1531–1575)

Jens Bille (or Bilde; 26 January 1531 – 28 April 1575) was a scribe and servant of the Monarchy of Denmark. He is best known today as the main scribe of one of the earliest surviving books of Danish poetry, Jens Billes visebog.

== Life ==
Jens Bille was born on 26 January 1531 in Varberg to Claus Bille and Lisbeth Ulfstand (died 1540). In his youth, Jens spent some years abroad and studied in Paris with his brother Steen Clausen Bille (1527–86). Their tutor during the journey was Christiern Mortensen Morsing, later Professor of Dialectic at the University of Copenhagen. After Jens's return we find him in 1555 as the Hofsinde at the court of Christian III of Denmark, and here he spent the following year.

While at Christian's court, between 1555 and 1559, Jens copied what is one of the earliest surviving manuscripts of Danish ballads, now known as Jens Billes visebog. As Hofsinde he served at Hoffanen in the Last Feud between the King of Denmark and the Ditmarsians immediately after Frederick II of Denmark's accession to the throne and took part in the battles at Meldorf and Heide. That same year, on 3 December 1559, he married Karen Rønnow, daughter of Ejler Rønnow of Hvidkilde, and the king accommodated his wedding at Nyborg Castle. On 11 December that year he was appointed governor of the island of Gotland, where he spent the following ten years, and defended the island during the Seven Years' War. After the end of the war, he returned to his father's farm Ljungsgård in 1570. In 1571 he had Billesholm built in Skåne, surrounded by a moat. This became Bille-Holmar, which then gave its name to the place Billesholm.

Jens and Karen Bille had two sons. It was the youngest son, Steen Jensen Bille (1565–1629), who later took over the farm on his father's death. After Steen, Steen's son Jens took over the farm and he became the last in the Bille line to live on Billesholm.

== Sources ==
- Kroman, E., 'Jens Billes Visebog', Danske Studier (1923), 170–79 (p. 176). https://web.archive.org/web/20130824064038/http://danskestudier.dk/materiale/1923.pdf
- Sjölin, Walter (1980). Jord och kol: bidrag till den skånska bondeklassens och kolbrytningens historia. Billesholmstraktens hembygdsförening.
