= Rosenholm Castle =

Castle in Denmark

Coordinates: 56°20′0.01″N 10°19′50.86″E

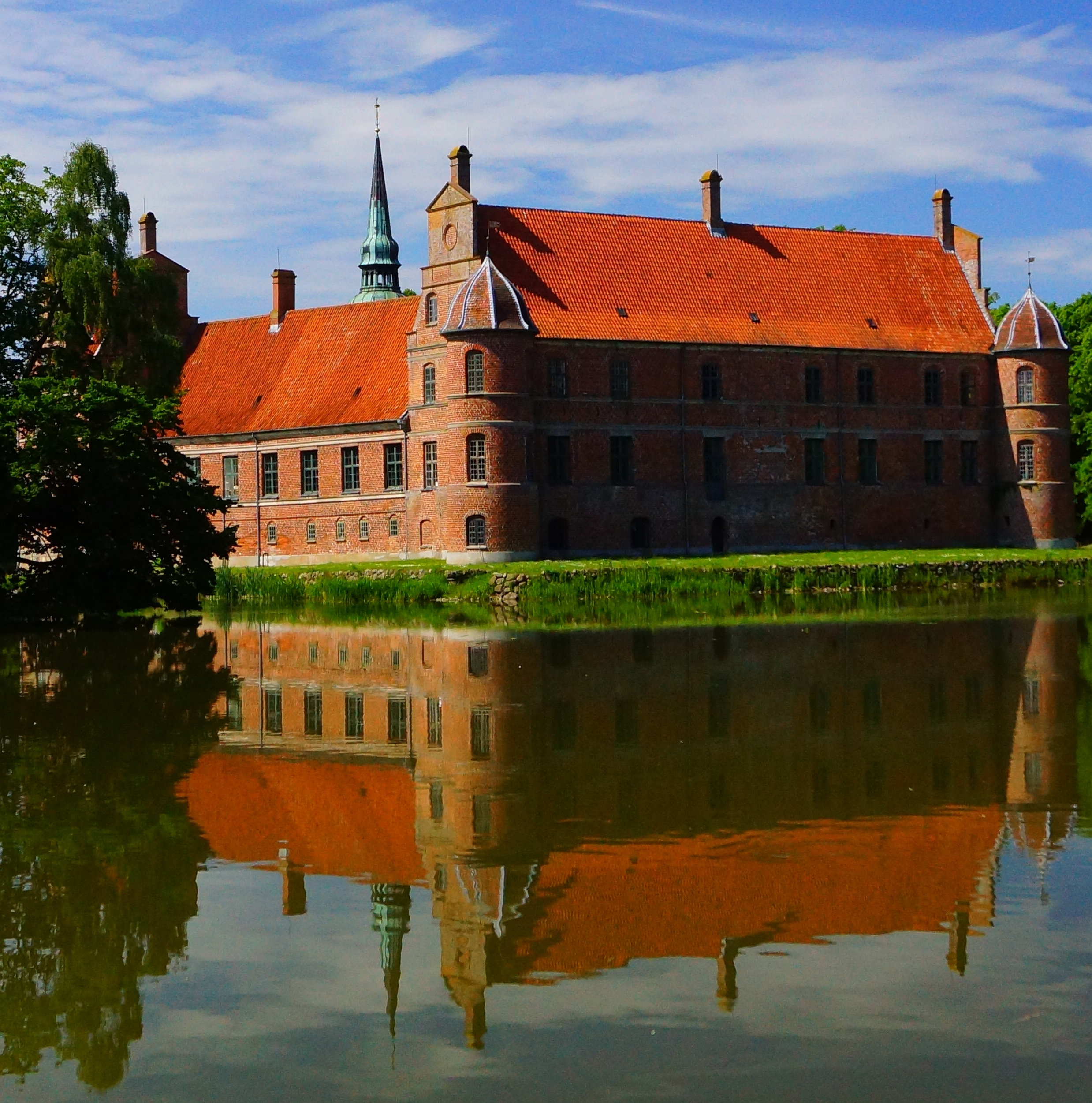
Rosenholm Castle, Djursland

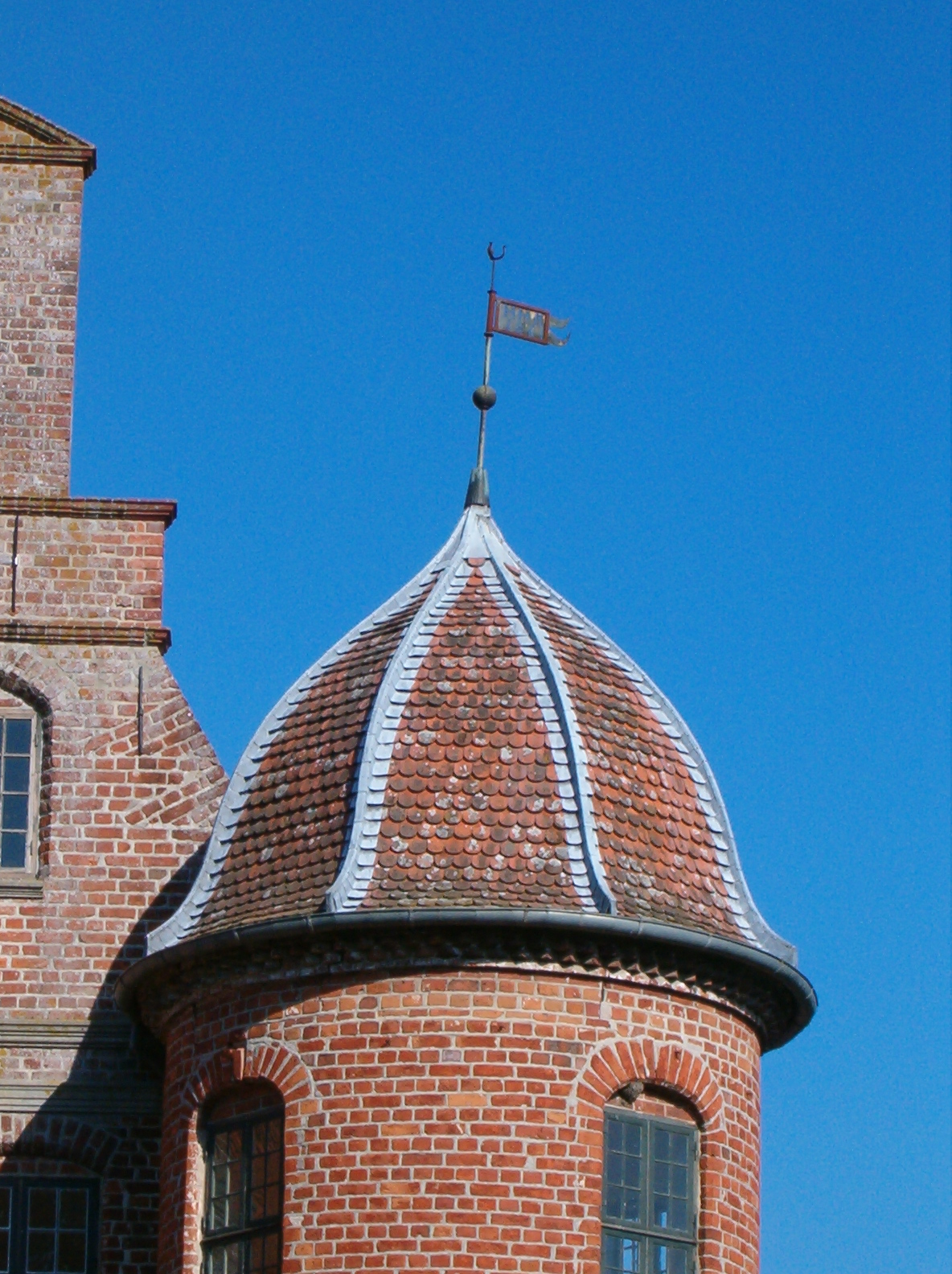
Corner tower at Rosenholm Castle

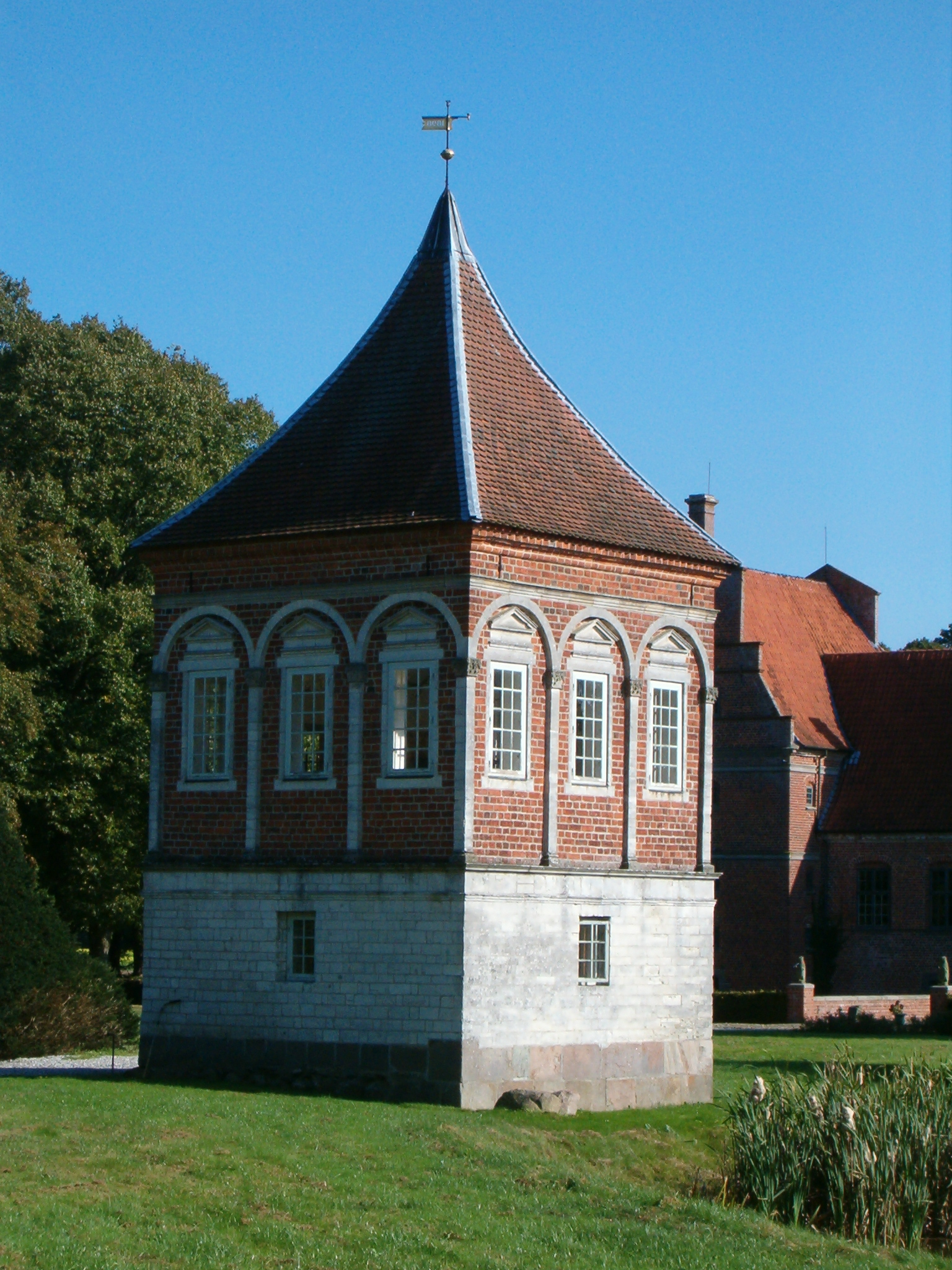
Pirkentavl gazebo

Rosenholm Castle (Danish: Rosenholm Slot) is Denmark's oldest family-owned castle. It is located on Djursland, north of Hornslet and northeast of Aarhus. It is one of the best-preserved complexes from the golden age of the manor house – from 1550 to 1630.

== History ==
The manor Holm is known from the 14th century. It was owned by the Catholic Church, but at the Reformation in 1536 it came in possession of The Crown. King Frederick II exchanged it for some other estates owned by Danish nobleman and diplomat Jørgen Ottesen Rosenkrantz (1523-1596). The Rosenkrantz family is among the oldest and most famous in Danish history. Shakespeare chose to use the surname in the play Hamlet.

Jørgen Rosenkrantz had two sons: Otto Rosenkrantz (1560-1582) and Holger Rosenkrantz (1574-1642). He built a manor for both of them: Skaføgård for Otto and Rosenholm for Holger. Unfortunately Otto died early, after which Skaføgård became a dower house for Jørgen's wife, Dorthe Lange (1541-1613) and after her death passed to their surviving son Holger.

Rosenholm Castle was founded in 1559. Jørgen Rosenkrantz built three wings, while the fourth and last was first added by his son Holger Ottesen Rosenkrantz (1517-1575). Its architecture was very much different from other castles in Denmark. It was mostly inspired from Italy. On the main facade there was an open loggia. It was later extended, standing complete in 1607 with four wings, clearly influenced by the French and Italian Renaissance styles. The castle interior was modernised in the 1740s in the Baroque style, at which time a large baroque garden was laid out, covering an area of 5 ha., with avenues of limetrees and hedgerows of beech.

=== Sights & attractions ===
- Manor house milieu over 450 years
- Anthroposophic paintings by the painter Arild Rosenkrantz.
- Baroque park with symmetrical avenues.
- Pirkentavl gazebo from around 1560.

== See also ==
- List of castles and palaces in Denmark
- Rosenkrantz (noble family)
- Skaføgård
