= Knut Alvsson =

Norwegian nobleman and landowner (1455–1502)

Knut Alvsson (1455 – 18 August 1502) was a Norwegian nobleman and landowner. He was the country's foremost Norwegian-born noble in his time and served as fief-holder in southern-central Norway.

He was heir of the Sudreim claim to the Norwegian throne in accordance with the order of succession agreed to by Norwegian nobility and religious leadership when the Sverre dynasty became extinct. From 1497 to 1499 he served as commander of Akershus Fortress but was removed in 1499 when he lost King Hans' confidence. In 1501 he led a rebellion against King Hans in Norway. He met his death at the hands of pro-Danish Henrich Krummedige’s men in spite of a promise of safe conduct, effectively weakening the rebellion severely as well as ending a feud which had started with their fathers, Hartvig Krummedige and Alv Knutsson.

== Background ==
Knut Alvsson was the son of Norwegian National Council member Alv Knutsson and his wife Magnhild Oddsdotter (ca. 1425–1499). He was the brother of Odd Alvsson (1460–1497), who was chief of Akershus fortress, and half-brother of Karl Sigurdsson (1476–1487), who served as Bishop of the Diocese of Hamar. He was descended on his paternal grandfather's side from the influential and wealthy Swedish Tre Rosor noble family, which were active during the period of the Kalmar Union.

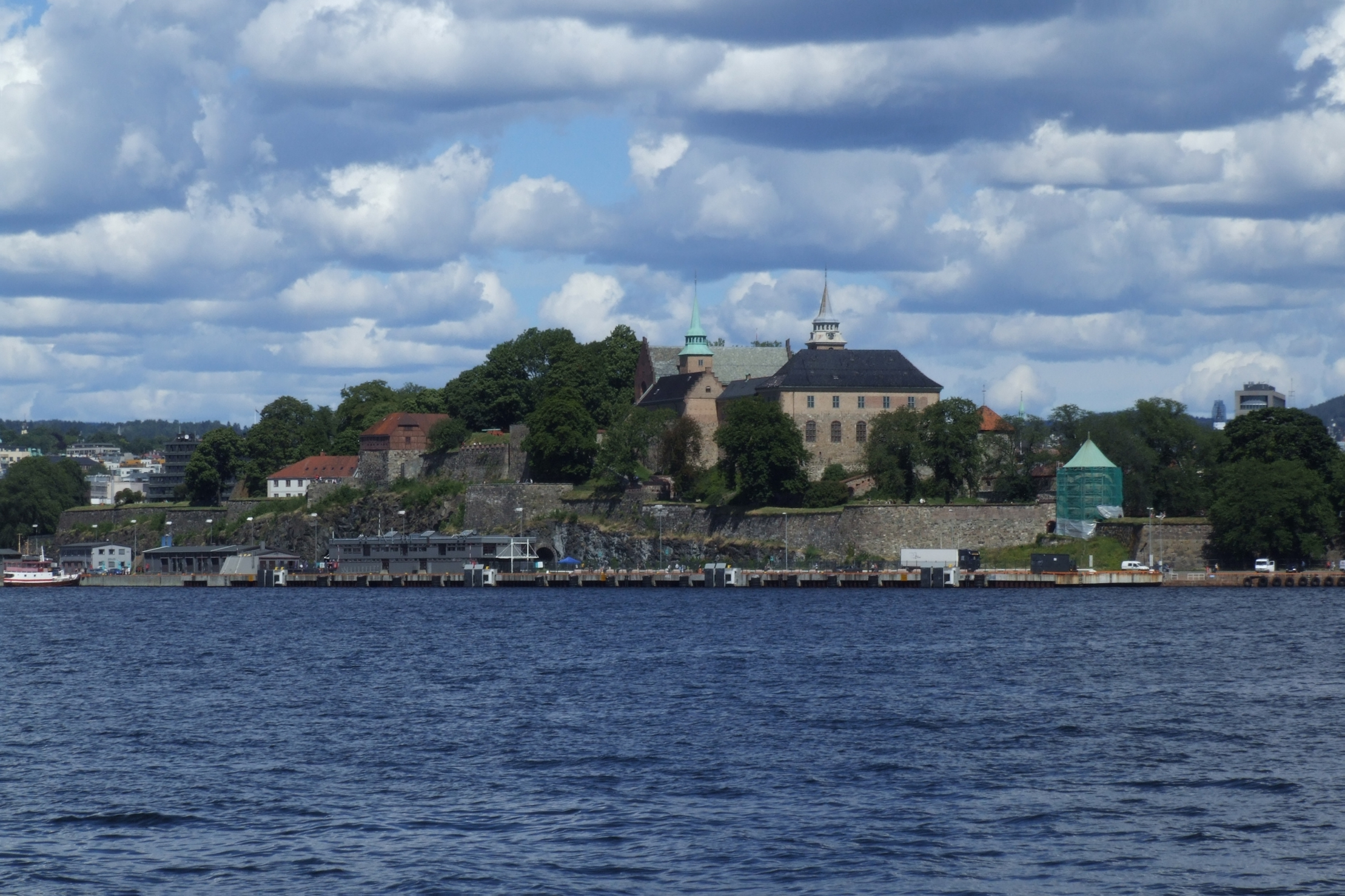
Knut Alvsson commanded Akershus Fortress

== Properties ==
He inherited the Giske and Sudreim properties from his father, one of the largest estate owners in Norway, as well as goods and property in Romerike from his brother Odd Alvsson, who died in 1497. He also held extensive properties in Sweden through his first marriage to the Swedish noblewoman Gyrvel Gyllenstjerna. Knut's property would be later forfeit to the crown. His estate in large part would subsequently be awarded to his granddaughter, Görvel Fadersdotter.

== Krummedige–Tre Rosor feud ==
Knut Alvsson inherited a long-standing feud with members of the family of Henrich Krummedige. As a member of the pro-Swedish faction on the Norwegian council of the realm, Knut was in natural opposition to Krummedige, who was a key member of the pro-Danish faction.

In the autumn of 1497 Knut Alvsson's sheriff to Romerike, Lasse Skjold, was killed by the people of the district. Knut received an open letter about the incident, which proclaimed that common people in the Nes and Ullensaker stood together in the action in protest of his oppressive tax collection practices.

Knut Alvsson discussed the rebellion of his people with the Danish and Norwegian councils of the realm and, following their recommendation, asked the offenders to apply for amnesty but they held him responsible for his sheriff's actions. The farmers chose to exercise their ancient right to summon a thing at Aker to submit their grievances and hear their defense for what they believed was a justified killing. They also intended to summon Knut Alvsson to the thing.

These actions, combined with signs that the rebellion was spreading throughout the sønnafjells (the region of Norway south of the Dovre mountains). Knut Alvsson was unable to quell the farmers' rebellion. The rebellion grew such that he was forced to request assistance from the commander of the Norwegian Båhus fortress, his rival and enemy, Henrich Krummedige, since the latter had demonstrated his ability to work constructively with his local landowners. Krummedige not only failed to support Knut Alvsson but also informed the king of the matter. Knut was relieved of his command of Akershus Fortress and replaced by Peder Griis, a Danish nobleman loyal to the king.

== Rebellion ==
In 1500 King Hans of Denmark, Sweden and Norway made an ill-fated attempt to conquer the Ditmarshes in Northern Germany. Knut Alvsson, who had married the granddaughter of Swedish King Karl Knutsson and was involved with the Swedish Independence Party, concluded it was time to act. While in Sweden, he participated in the Swedish National Council meeting in Vadstena Castle in 1501, at which the council approved the revolt against King Hans. Knut Alvsson directed harsh accusations against King Hans' control in Norway and was provided Swedish support for his return to Norway, based on the belief that a Norwegian uprising would quickly follow the Swedish uprising. In 1501 he led Swedish forces in an attack on Båhus Fortress on the Swedish-Norwegian border, which Henrich Krummedige still commanded. Krummedige was able to hold his fief of Båhus, but Knut Alvsson captured Akershus Fortress in March 1502, although the citizens of Oslo remained pro-Danish while the nobles and bishops of the country remained neutral—presumably waiting to see which side prevailed.

King Hans dispatched his son Christian (later crowned King Christian II of Denmark and Norway) at the head of Danish forces; they relieved the siege of Båhus Fortress and also captured Älvsborg Fortress across the river from Båhus Fortress in Gothenburg. Krummedige then led forces north to finish off the rebellion by recapturing Tønsberg Fortress and investing Akershus Fortress, which Knut Alvsson was defending.

When it became clear that the rebellion was stalemated, Knut Alvsson came on board one of Krummedige's ships under a safe conduct. Krummedige's men killed Knut Alvsson on 18 August 1502, either by treachery or, as alleged by Krummedige's men, in response to Knut's own violence. Breaking the rules of safe conduct was considered a grave treachery after the old Norse laws, which were still used in Norway at the time. However, the court in Oslo deemed Krummedige to have acted justly. The conditions for this judgment have been discussed by historians for years.

The crown judged Knut Alvsson a traitor. Krummedige had prevailed, although Gjerset reports he was compelled to leave Norway, and the uprising was not totally quelled until December 1504 (Nils Ravaldsson became the leader of the rebellion after Knut's death). Knut Alvsson's death at the hand of Krummedige's minions caused the rebellion against the king to collapse. It also solidified the Danish-Norwegian ties and marked the last attempt at Norwegian independence for over 300 years.

== In literature ==
The death of Knut Alvsson has been romanticized to serve as a centerpiece for Norwegian Romantic Nationalism. Ibsen characterized the period of the Scandinavian Union and the subsequent Dano-Norwegian union (1537–1814) as "Four Hundred Years of Darkness" as part of the Norwegian nationalistic romantic literature upwelling at the close of the 18th century. For example, it was used to set an anti-Danish tone in Ibsen's play Fru Inger til Østeraad, when he has Olaf Skaktavl acclaim: "Recall the afternoon when Hendrik Krummedike came before Akershus fortress with his fleet? The captains of the fleet offered to discuss peace terms, and, trusting a safe conduct, Knut Alfsøn went onboard. Only three hours later we had to carry him through the fortress gate ... Norway's bravest heart was lost when Krummedike's minions struck him down..."
