= History of the Norwegian monarchy =

The Kingdom of Norway as a unified realm dates to the reign of King Harald I Fairhair in the 9th century. His efforts in unifying the petty kingdoms of Norway resulted in the first known Norwegian central government. The country, however, soon fragmented and was collected into one entity in the first half of the 11th century, and Norway has retained a monarchy since that time. Traditionally, it has been viewed as being ruled by the Fairhair dynasty, though modern scholars question whether the eleventh century kings and their successors were truly descendants of Harald.

== Fairhair dynasty, traditional and modern views ==
According to the traditional view, Norway was the hereditary kingdom of the 'Fairhair' dynasty, agnatic (patrilineal) descendants of the first unifier-king, Harald Fairhair. The successors to the throne after year 872 were all placed by among Harald's male descendants in historical accounts from centuries later. In the 13th century, the kingdom was officially declared hereditary by law, in contrast with the other Scandinavian monarchies which were elective kingdoms in the Middle Ages.

Harald Fairhair was the first king of all Norway, bringing the lands of what had previously been several distinct petty-kingdoms under his control. The foundation of this unified Norwegian kingdom is traditionally dated to 872, when he defeated the last petty kings who resisted him at the Battle of Hafrsfjord, though the consolidation of his power took many years. Fairhair's kingdom spanned the coastal areas north to Trøndelag, but upon his death the kingship was fragmented back into the petty kingdoms, most being held by Harald's sons, descendants or allies, though there were also districts in the hands of other dynasties, such as Ladejarls. Nonetheless, the concept of control by a central power had come into existence. It remains disputed the degree to which Norway should be viewed as an hereditary kingdom under Fairhair's sons and successors, Eric I of Norway and Haakon I of Norway. Some historians emphasize their inability to exercise actual monarchical control over the country and assert that St. Olav (Olaf II), who reigned from 1015, was the first king since Fairhair to control the entire country. Olav is traditionally held to be the driving force behind Norway's final conversion to Christianity. He was later also revered as Rex Perpetuum Norvegiæ (Latin: eternal king of Norway). Only under half-brothers Olav II and Harald III would succession begin to be determined by rules of inheritance, rather than the crown simply being taken by force.

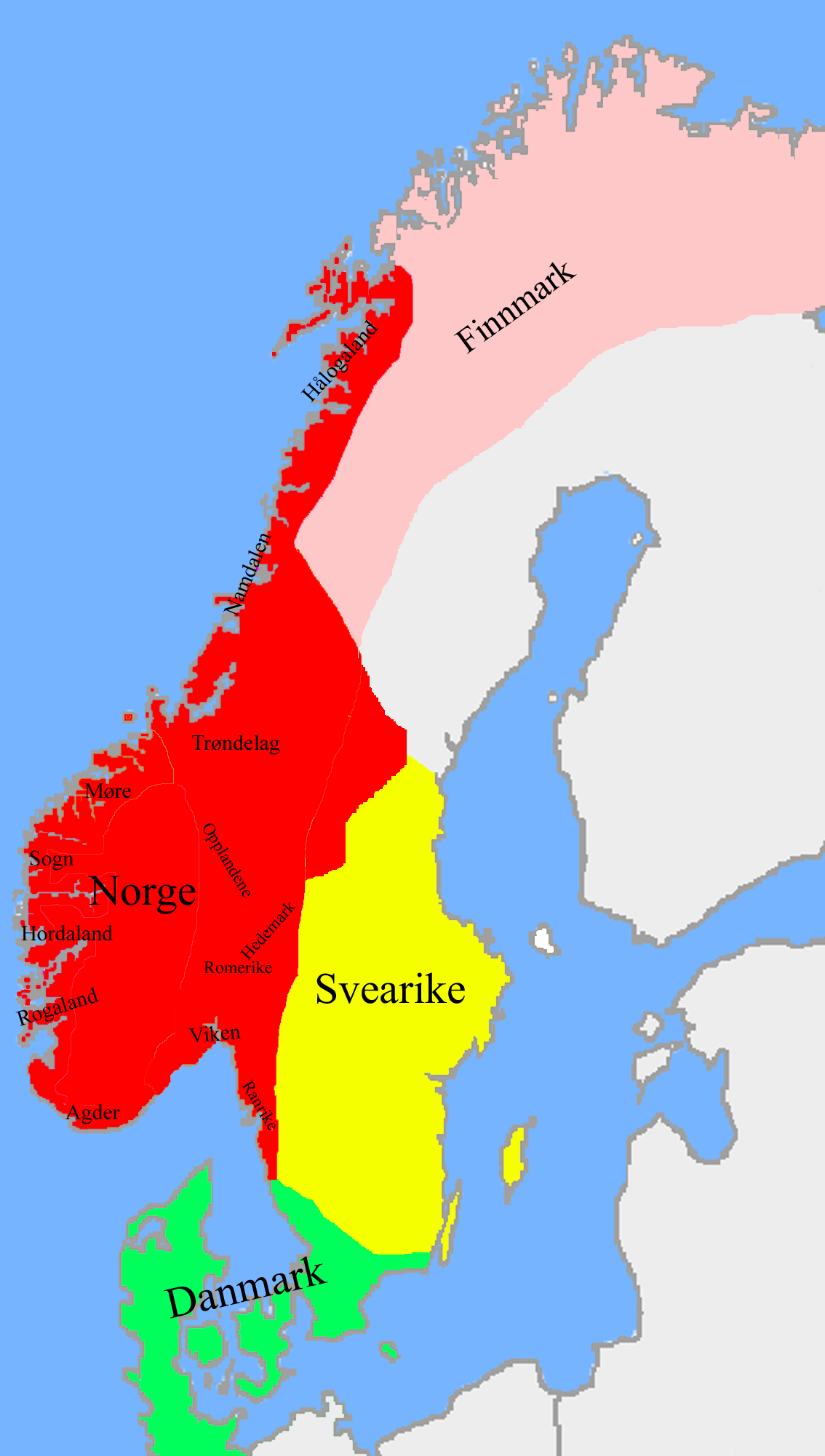
Mainland Norway during the reign of Saint Olav c. 1020 AD. The Finnmarken ("Marches of the Sami"), most of which paid tribute to the kings of Norway, are shown in pink.

The Fairhair dynasty may, however, be an artificial construct. The murder of king Harald Greycloak in 970 brought an end to the rule of the immediate family of his grandfather, Harald Fairhair, and Norway was ruled instead by the Danish king and his proxies for 25 years. Olav I of Norway, who had been raised overseas in obscure circumstances, forcibly conquered the kingdom. His death resulted in another 15-year period of Danish rule before the successful Viking raider, Olav Haraldson in turn conquered the kingdom and was succeeded by his son and then by his half-brother, Harald Hardråde, himself a famous Viking. The later heroic sagas would give each of these three warrior kings distant descents from Harald Fairhair. However, it has been proposed (most vociferously by Claus Krag) that the genealogical lines connecting Harald Fairhair via otherwise obscure individuals to Olav I, Olav II and Harald Hardråde are a political fiction, founded on a later attempt to legitimize their rule and that of Hardråde's descendants, as well as to provide a claim to the region of Viken (the area around the present-day Oslo), a claim challenged by the Danes. Adherents of this proposal consider Harald Hardråde to be the first king of the lineage that would later rule the realm, and that his claim at the time rested solely on being maternal half-brother of Olav II, and not a distant descent from Fairhair. Descent from the same mother was not in Germanic understanding a proper dynastic tie, and thus Harald Hardråde's legitimacy necessitated the fabrication of unbroken male line descents for him and his two predecessors from Fairhair. These fabricated descents are what would appear in the pseudo-historical sagas of Heimskringla.

== The Hårdråde and the Sverre dynasties ==
Under Harald Hårdråde, Norway was firmly established as an independent kingdom and all later kings would claim to be descendants of him. With a few notable exceptions all successful claims are well supported and not disputed by modern historians. This succession of kings is sometimes called the "Hårdråde ætten" to distinguish them from the certain issue of Harald Fairhair. If Hårdråde is accepted as a descendant of Fairhair this dynasty would be just a branch of a larger Fairhair dynasty. The kings themselves are not known to have referred to their dynasty with any official name.

Until the 13th century there were no clearly defined succession laws. Instead the succession was based on customs with origins in old Germanic traditions: The situation followed loosely agnatic seniority and agnatic succession with some elements of elective monarchy. All patrilineal male descendants of Harald Hårdråde were entitled to share the kingship. This included sons born outside marriage and many kings had semi-official concubines. To formally become king the candidate had to be hailed at the thing – though he would naturally make sure to have the assembly's support before launching his candidacy. The sources do not record any instance of a candidate being turned down by a thing after demanding to be hailed. As kingship gradually took shape as an institution a few things, particularly Øreting in Trøndelag, received a special status as the places the new king was hailed.

The result of these customs was that brothers and half-brothers would inherit the throne to rule jointly, but such arrangements rarely lasted. As a result, succession was generally a matter of conflict, intrigue, and at times minor civil war. From the 1130s, strifes escalated to a more or less continuous civil war until 1240.

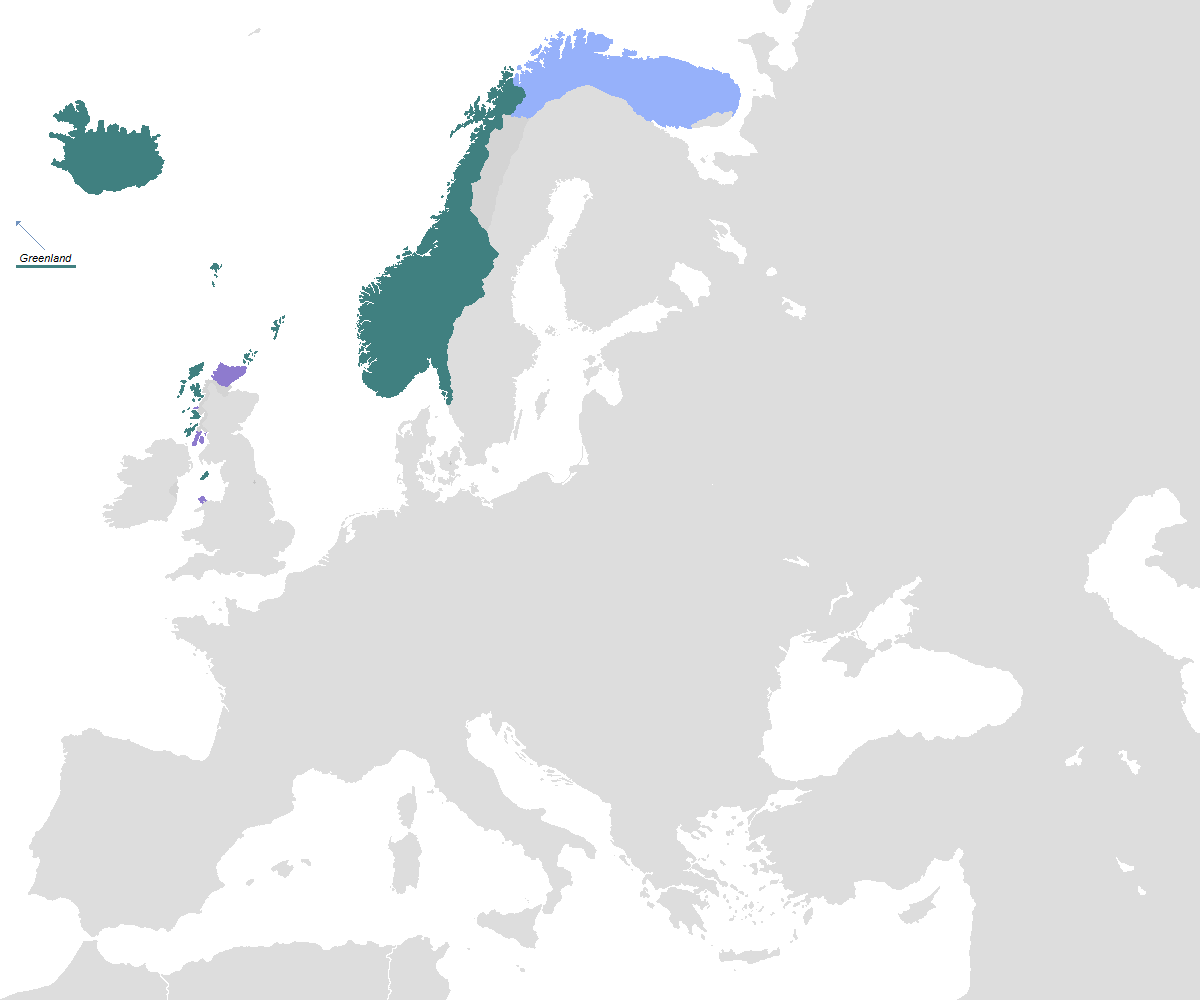
Norwegian kingdom.

However, during the reign of the Hårdråde branch of the dynasty, it was generally agreed that only patrilineal male descendants of King Harald III, were entitled to the kingship.

Many of the claims by later royal pretenders to belong to the Fairhair dynasty are obvious falsehoods (most notably that of Sverre Sigurdsson).

1163, Magnus V of Norway, the son of a daughter of a previous ruler, ascended to the throne. He was supported by the church, but despite initial success, and the first example of a codified law of succession (allowing his own cognatic heirship), he was overthrown by putative male-line members of the old royal dynasty.

In the 13th century, the kingdom was officially declared hereditary by king Haakon Haakonsson, through a succession system that was based on primogeniture. It was also under Haakon Haakonsson, himself the illegitimate son of king Haakon Sverresson, that legitimacy of birth became a factor in the line of succession. Haakon's eldest son, Sigurd, was accordingly bypassed by Haakon's legitimate sons, Haakon and Magnus.

In the tradition of the Germanic monarchy the king had to be elected by a representative assembly of noblemen. Men eligible for election had to be of royal blood; the eldest son of the previous king was not automatically chosen. During the civil war era the unclear succession laws and the practice of power-sharing between several kings simultaneously gave personal conflicts the potential to become full-blown wars. Over the centuries kings consolidated their power and eventually a strict succession law made Norway a principally hereditary kingdom. As a result of the unions with Denmark and Sweden, the heredity principles were several times flouted in the succession to the throne, until they were explicitly abolished in 1450.

== Unions with Denmark and Sweden ==
After the extinction of the male lines of the perceived Fairhair dynasty in 1319, the throne of Norway passed through matrilineal descent to Magnus VII, who in the same year became elected as king of Sweden too. In 1343 Magnus had to abdicate as King of Norway in favour of his younger son, Haakon VI of Norway. The oldest son, Eric, was explicitly removed from the future line of succession of Norway. Traditionally Norwegian historians have interpreted this clear break with previous successions as stemming from dissatisfaction among the Norwegian nobility with Norway's junior position in the union. However it may also be the result of Magnus' dynastic policies. He had two sons and two kingdoms and might have wished they should inherit one each, rather than start battling over the inheritance. Magnus was at the same time attempting to secure Eric's future election as King of Sweden.

The Black Death of 1349–1351 was a contributing factor to the decline of the Norwegian monarchy as the noble families and population in general were gravely affected. But the most devastating factor for the nobility and the monarchy in Norway was the steep decline in income from their holdings. Many farms were deserted and rents and taxes suffered. This left the Norwegian monarchy weakened in terms of manpower, noble support, defence ability and economic power.

After the death of Haakon VI of Norway in 1380, his son Olav IV of Norway succeeded to both the thrones of Norway and Denmark and also claimed the Kingdom of Sweden (holding its westernmost provinces already). Only after his death at the age of 17 his mother Margaret managed to oust their rival, king Albert, from Sweden, and thus united the three Scandinavian kingdoms in personal union under one crown, in the Kalmar Union. Olav's death extinguished yet one Norwegian male royal line; he was also the last Norwegian king to be born on Norwegian soil for the next 567 years.

After the death of Olav IV of Norway in 1387, the closest in line to the succession was the Swedish king Albert of Mecklenburg. However, his succession was politically unacceptable to the Norwegians and Danes. Next in line were the descendants of the Sudreim lineage, legitimate descendants of Haakon V of Norway's illegitimate, but recognized daughter Agnes Haakonardottir, Dame of Borgarsyssel. However, the candidate from this lineage renounced his claim to the throne in favour of Eric of Pomerania, Queen Margaret's favoured candidate. The succession right of this lineage resurfaced in 1448 after the death of King Christopher, but the potential candidate, Sigurd Jonsson, again renounced his candidature – see Sudreim claim. Eric's succession was one in a line of successions which did not precisely follow the laws of inheritance, but excluded one or a few undesirable heirs, leading to Norway formally becoming an elective kingdom in 1450.

Starting with Margaret I of Denmark, the throne of Norway was held by a series of non-Norwegian kings (usually perceived as Danish) who variously held the throne to more than one Scandinavian countries, or of all of them.

In 1440, the Norwegian privy council reluctantly deposed king Eric III (1383–1459), after Denmark and Sweden had done the same. The nearest heir to throne was Eric's cousin, Bugislav, but the succession-laws were overlooked because of the necessity to choose the same king as Denmark and Sweden. Christopher of Bavaria was therefore chosen as Norwegian king.

In 1448 when Christopher died without close heirs, the union between Sweden and Denmark dissolved, as the two countries chose different kings. Sweden chose Charles Knutsson Bonde, while Denmark chose Christian of Oldenburg (Christian I of Denmark). Norway was thus left with a dilemma. Once again, hereditary rights seem to have had little influence over the decisions made (according to feudal inheritance, the Duke of Mecklenburg would have been closest in rights, and Duke Adolf of Schleswig-Holstein as head of next branch, who however had supported his nephew Christian's election). Sigurd Jonsson, of the Sudreim-line, a descendant of Haakon V of Norway, seems to have been mentioned as a candidate, but turned the offer down. The Norwegian nobility then split between supporters of king Charles of Sweden and King Christian of Denmark. Charles succeeded in being crowned king of Norway in Trondheim in 1449, but in 1450 agreed to renounce the Norwegian throne to King Christian of Denmark in a separate peace deal with Denmark. The Norwegians were not a party to this decision, but were left with Christian as their only candidate. He was crowned in Trondheim the same year. Thus, the House of Oldenburg was first introduced to the Norwegian monarchy. In a union treaty, drawn up by the privy councils of Norway and Denmark in Bergen in 1450, it was specified that Norway was to be an elected kingdom, and have the same king as Denmark in perpetuity. On the death of the king, the Norwegian and Danish privy councils would meet and elect the new king among the previous king's legitimate sons. If no such son existed, the choice was free, but the councils should not part until they had agreed on a common king.

== Denmark–Norway ==
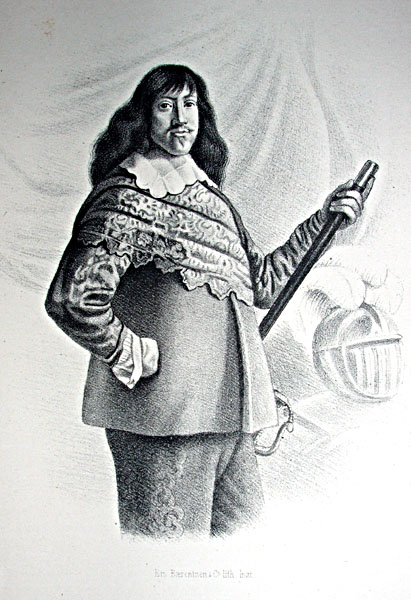
King Frederick III

On 6 June 1523, Sweden left the union for good, leaving Norway in an unequal union with a Danish king already embarked on centralising the government of the Union.

In the following centuries the Norwegian monarchy was characterised by a king mostly residing abroad. This weakened the monarchical governing structures of Norway; the Riksråd, for example, was gradually undermined as the Norwegian nobles were not able to enjoy the King's confidence to the same extent as their Danish counterparts. The King was also less able to govern according to Norwegian needs as the distance meant he and his advisors had less knowledge of the conditions in Norway.

Norway was one of few countries where the archdiocese was coterminous with the national territory. The church was therefore an important factor in trying to maintain the separate Norwegian monarchy. In the 16th century the power struggle between the Norwegian nobles and the king culminated at the same time as the Protestant Reformation. This prompted an unfortunate set of events in which the struggle against the Danish dominance in Norway was coupled with the struggle against the reformation. When both failed the effects were harsh. The Norwegian Catholic bishops were replaced with Lutheran bishops. The Norwegian Riksråd was de facto abolished in 1536/1537 and more and more foreign men were appointed to important positions in Norway.

In 1661, Frederick III introduced absolute monarchy in Denmark and Norway and introduced a new law, the Lex Regis in both countries to that effect. In this law the kingdoms of Denmark and Norway were proclaimed to be hereditary.

== Emerging independence ==
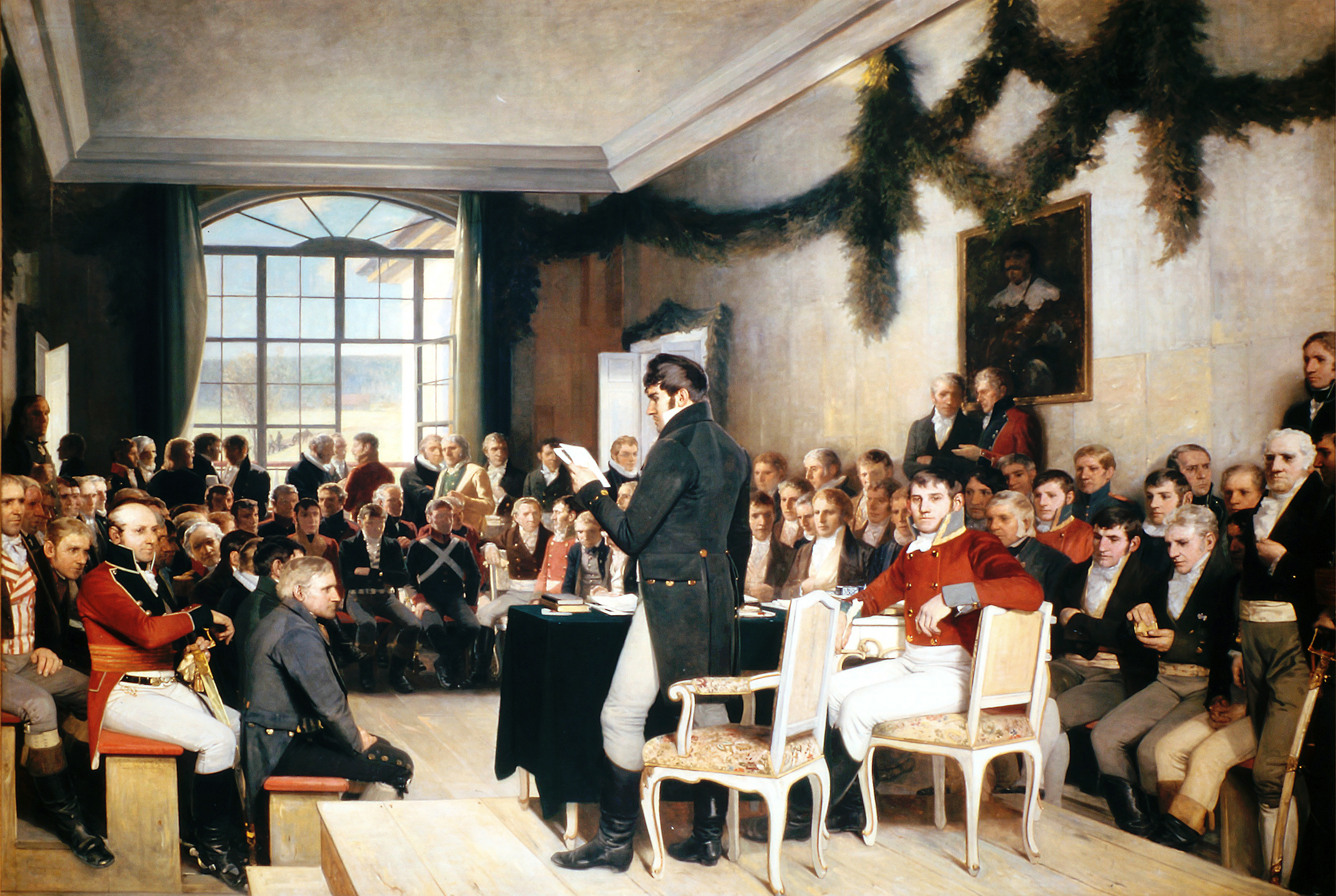
The Constituent Assembly at Eidsvoll in 1814.

During the Napoleonic Wars the King aligned Denmark–Norway with France. When Napoleon lost the war Denmark was forced to cede Norway to the king of Sweden under the Treaty of Kiel in 1814. It was initially proposed that the Norwegian dependencies of Greenland, Iceland and the Faroes would remain with Norway, but that point was dropped during the negotiations so they became Danish.

On hearing news of the treaty, Prince Christian Frederick of Denmark and Norway, the resident viceroy in Norway, participated in founding a Norwegian independence movement. The independence movement was successful, partly due to clandestine support from the Danish Crown, but also because of the strong desire for independence in Norway. On 10 April, a national assembly met at Eidsvoll to decide on a constitution. Norway eventually declared independence on 17 May 1814, electing Christian Frederik as King. A short war with Sweden later that year ended with the Convention of Moss. This led to the ousting of Christian Frederick, and the Norwegian Storting electing Charles XIII of Sweden as King of Norway, creating the union between Sweden and Norway. In turn the king recognised the Norwegian constitution which was only changed to facilitate the union.

The end result was that the Norwegian monarchy became a constitutional monarchy. In this new union the King was much more a King of Norway than under the previous Danish system. Norway was not to be treated as a Swedish conquest but rather as an equal party in a union of two independent states. Both the principle and substance of the Norwegian Constitution were accepted, and Norway retained its own parliament and separate institutions, except for the common king and foreign service. The only area of policy not in the hands of the Norwegians was foreign policy.

Norway had been brought along into the new developments of the world as they arrived in Denmark. However, with the break the Norwegians were able to forge a more progressive political development than was the case in Denmark. Denmark introduced a constitutional monarchy 35 years after Norway. Parliamentarism was introduced in 1884 in Norway, 17 years before Denmark and 33 years before Sweden. The union with Denmark also had its adverse effects on the monarchy, among other things it resulted in the crown of Norway experiencing a loss of territory which today amounts to 2,322 755 km^{2}. However, Norway's territorial size has been more than restored due to Norwegian expansionism in the early 20th century, which led to the annexation of Queen Maud Land (1939) in Antarctica, an area comprising roughly 27,000,000 km^{2} (10,424,758 sq mi). Very few royal undertakings had been located to Norway and the country is thus lacking the monumental palaces of the period as can be seen in Copenhagen and other parts of Denmark.

The Norwegian Storting would propose laws based in Norway and the King would even on occasion enact laws unfavourable to Sweden. As the Norwegian movement towards full independence gained momentum the King approved the building of forts and naval vessels intended to defend Norway against a Swedish invasion.

The union was nevertheless marked by the Norwegians' constant and growing discontent with being in a union of any kind. The Storting would propose laws to reduce the king's power or to assert Norwegian independence. This would most often be vetoed by the king, but as he only had the right to veto the same law twice it would eventually be passed. Already in 1814 the Norwegians instituted a separate flag, this would remain an issue until the union badge was discarded from the Norwegian flag in 1898. In 1837, local self-government in certain areas of policy was introduced in rural areas as well as towns. Parliamentarism was introduced in 1884.

Quite often, crown princes of the dynasty served some time in the position of Viceroy of Norway at Oslo, as sort of training for their future reign.

Charles II, as he was officially known in Norway, was succeeded in both kingdoms by his adopted son Charles III John of Norway, the first Bernadotte. He had no known genealogical roots in Norway, but he had his son and heir, the future Oscar I of Norway marry Josephine of Leuchtenberg, a descendant of the earlier kings Christian II and Frederick II, and thus descending from all their ancestors too. Her sons, Charles IV and Oscar II, were thus issue of the so-called Fairhair dynasty.

It also has to be said that the Royal House tried harder to be a Norwegian Royal House as well. The Royal Palace in Oslo was built during this period. There were separate coronations in Trondheim as stipulated in the Constitution. The royal princes even had a hunting lodge built in Norway in order to spend more private time there. King Oscar II himself is said to have been fluent in Norwegian.

== The second independent Norway ==
=== Change of dynasty ===
The third Bernadotte king was Charles IV of Norway. He did not have any male descendants to inherit his thrones of Sweden and Norway, these thrones were "lost" to Charles XV's younger brother, Oscar II, instead of his only daughter Lovisa of Sweden, crown princess of Denmark. It has been said that Carl XV promised Lovisa on his deathbed that eventually a son of Lovisa would be entitled to be the heir of the Norwegian throne.

Lovisa's son, Prince Carl of Denmark (namesake of his maternal grandfather the King of Norway and Sweden) was the second son of the future King Frederik VIII of Denmark, a younger brother of Denmark's future King Christian X (young Carl personally became a king before his father and his brother), a paternal grandson of king Christian IX of Denmark (during whose reign he was prince of Denmark) and a maternal grandson of King Charles IV of Norway (who was also King of Sweden). He was born in 1872, a few weeks before King Charles died.

The future Haakon VII of Norway belonged to the House of Oldenburg, which 1448–1814 was the Royal House of union of Denmark and Norway, to its branch Schleswig-Holstein-Sonderburg-Glücksburg.

His family had permanent links with Norway already beginning from late Middle Ages, and also several of his father's ancestors had been kings of independent Norway (such as Haakon V of Norway, Christian I of Norway, Frederick I, Christian III, Frederick II, Christian IV, as well as Frederick III of Norway). Christian Frederick, who was King of Norway briefly in 1814, the first king of the Norwegian 1814 constitution and struggle for independence, was his great-granduncle.

In 1905, Carl, taking the name Haakon, ascended the throne of independent Norway to succeed his deposed great-uncle Oscar II.

=== Full independence ===
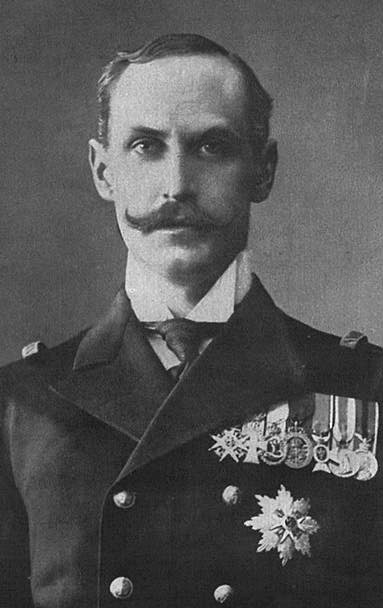
King Haakon VII early during his reign.

In 1905 a series of disputes between parliament and the King culminated with the matter of separate Norwegian consuls to foreign countries. Norway had grown into one of the world's leading shipping nations while Sweden retained control of both the diplomatic and consulate corps. The Swedes had little insight in the matters Norwegian ships and businessmen needed assistance with abroad and consulates were not even established in several important shipping cities. The demand for separate Norwegian consuls was seen as very important by the Norwegian parliament and society. The Storting proposed a law establishing a separate Norwegian consulate corps. King Oscar II refused to ratify the law and subsequently the Norwegian cabinet resigned. The king was not able to form any other government that had the support of parliament and as such it was deemed on 7 June that he had failed to function as King of Norway.

The Norwegian people gave their consent in a plebiscite held on 13 August which resulted in an overwhelming 368,208 votes (99.95%) in favor of dissolution of the Union, against 184 (0.05%) opposed, with 85 percent of Norwegian men voting. No women voted, as universal suffrage was not granted until 1913, however Norwegian feminists collected more than 200,000 signatures in favor of dissolution.

On 12 November and 13 November, in the second constitutional plebiscite in three months, Norwegian voters decided by a nearly 79 percent majority (259,563 to 69,264) to keep the monarchy instead of establishing a republic.

During the summer a Norwegian delegation had already approached the 33-year-old Prince Carl of Denmark, the second son of the Crown Prince Frederik of Denmark. The Norwegian parliament had considered other candidates but ultimately chose Prince Carl, partly because he already had a son to continue the line of succession, but more significantly because Carl was married to Maud of Wales, the daughter of King Edward VII of the United Kingdom. By bringing in a king with British royal ties, it was hoped that Norway could court Britain's support.

Prince Carl impressed the delegation in many ways, not the least because of his sensitivity to the liberal and democratic movements that had led to Norway's independence. Though the Norwegian constitution stipulated that the Storting could choose a new king if the throne were vacant, Carl was aware that many Norwegians — including leading politicians and high-ranking military officers — favored a republican form of government. Attempts to persuade the prince to accept the throne on the basis of election at Parliament failed; Carl insisted that he would accept the crown only if the Norwegian people expressed their will for monarchy by referendum and if the parliament then elected him king.

Following the November plebiscite affirming Norwegians' desire for a monarchy, the parliament by an overwhelming majority offered Carl a clear mandate to the Norwegian throne on 18 November. The prince accepted the same evening, choosing the name Haakon, a traditional name used by Norwegian kings. The last king with that name had been Haakon VI, who died in the year 1380.

The new king therefore became Haakon VII, King of Norway. His two-year-old son Alexander, the heir apparent, was renamed Olav and became Crown Prince Olav. The new royal family arrived in the capital Kristiania (later Oslo) on 25 November. Haakon VII was sworn in as king of Norway on 27 November.

=== A new monarchy ===
The early years of the new Norwegian monarchy were marked by a shortage of funds. The Norwegian state was poor and funds were needed elsewhere than in the upkeep of a large court. In that sense it was a stroke of good fortune that Prince Carl had set as a condition for accepting the throne that he would not be forced to keep a large court. However the royal travels and the upkeep of the royal residences, after the initial refurbishment in 1905, were to some extent neglected. One example of the negative financial situation is that Prince Carl had been promised a Royal Yacht when he accepted the throne, but this was not fulfilled until 1947.

One important incident in the early years of the new monarchy was in 1928 when the King appointed the first Labour government. The Norwegian Labour Party was at that time quite radical and even had the abolition of monarchy as part of their programme. It was the custom for the King to rely on the advice of previous Prime Minister in deciding whom to give the assignment as new Prime Minister. In this case the previous conservative Prime Minister was opposed to giving power to the radicals and advised the appointment of someone else. But the King adhered to the established practice of parliamentarism and decided to appoint Christopher Hornsrud the first Labour Prime Minister. The Labour party later dropped the abolition of monarchy from their programme.

During the German occupation of World War II the King was an important symbol of national unity and resistance. His steadfast opposition to the German demands of surrender was important for the fighting spirit of the Norwegian population. The constitutional powers granted to the King in the Norwegian monarchical system made his position very important and enabled the government in exile to continue its work with the utmost legitimacy.

After the war the Norwegian royal house succeeded in maintaining a balance between regality and approachability. King Olav V was deemed the people's king and the spontaneous show of mourning from the population upon his death in 1991 demonstrated the high standing he had among the Norwegian people. Even republicans were among the masses lighting candles in front of the Palace.

In later years the marriages of the then Crown Prince Harald in 1968 and of Crown Prince Haakon in 2001 sparked considerable controversy, but the lasting effect on the popularity of the monarchy has been minimal. Although decreased from its level of above 90 percent after the war, support for the monarchy seems to remain stable around and mostly above the 70 percent mark.

== Heir of Norway ==
Use of the title "Heir of Norway" (Arving til Norge) established in the 17th century. Firstly, several junior agnatic members of the House of Oldenburg (the Duke of Holstein-Gottorp among the first ones), themselves usually titular Dukes in Schleswig-Holstein, assumed the title to constant use, as one of their main titles. There are plenty of examples from official dispatches and notices of the 17th, 18th and 19th century of several princely persons titled "Duke of Holstein, Heir of Norway". This is why it has been used as part of their titles by the emperors of Russia until 1917 since their agnatic line traces back to Peter III of Russia, first Russian ruler from the House of Oldenburg.

From the 15th century, at least up to 1660, the heir apparent of the King of Denmark and Norway was generally titled "Prince of Norway", in recognition to his hereditary right to succeed to the Norwegian throne upon the death of the king, as opposed to the need to pass an election in order to succeed to the Danish throne. Other members of House of Oldenburg, including any younger siblings of the Prince of Norway, were not called princes or princesses of Norway, but the title "Heir of Norway" was sooner or later accorded to them.

Next, the heads of the line descending from Haakon V of Norway's illegitimate, but succession-entitlement-recognized daughter Agnes Haakonardottir, started also to use the same title "Heir of Norway". They got support from monarchs of the Swedish Empire to their pretension, being interested in challenging the Danish grip to Norway. Their forefathers (or predecessors in claim line) had in the 14th and 15th centuries launched their ambitions towards Norwegian throne even as revolts - see Sudreim claim.

== See also ==
- Ahnentafel of Harald V of Norway
- Kings of Norway family tree
- Norwegian nobility
- List of Norwegian monarchs
- List of possessions of Norway
