= Jon Havtoresson =

Jon Havtoresson (born about 1312, died July 19 1395) was the son of knight Havtore Jonsson and princess Agnes Håkonsdatter, illegitimate daughter of King Håkon V Magnusson.

Jon and his brother Sigurd belonged to the most powerful families in Norway. They were grandsons of King Håkon Magnusson, and through his father Havtore they belonged to the Sudrheimætten (Sørum - family), a powerful family of Romerike who were probably descendants of Bård Guttormsson on Rein, and perhaps also Harald Gille. Thus Jon and his brother of the royal family were also on the father's side. When his father Havtore died, Jon, who was probably the eldest of the brothers, inherited the farm Skea, with several properties in Solør and Odalen. In addition to the farms in Skea, Jon also got several properties in Østfold, including the main farms Borregård in Tune and Huseby in Onsøy.

Jon was governor in Borgarsysla and was an adviser to both King Magnus Eriksson (Norwegian king 1319–1355) and King Håkon VI Magnusson (Norwegian king 1355–1380).

Jon was married to Birgitta Knutsdatter (first mentioned in 1322, died before 1395), daughter of a knight, riksråd and lagmann Knut Magnusson (mentioned 1304–39) and Cecilia Röriksdatter (mentioned 1320–34). He left at least three sons, Ulv, Håkon and Brynjolv, and probably also a fourth, Ivar. The first three all became councilors. The daughter Cecilia was married to the Swedish-born knight and councilor Ulv Holmgeirsson. Through his son Brynjolv, the now living Swedish noble family Roos af Hjelmsäter in direct male line from Jon.
