= General Roos =

General Roos may refer to:

- Axel Erik Roos (1684–1765), Swedish Army lieutenant general
- Carl Gustaf Roos (1655–1722), Carolean Swedish Army major general
- Helm Roos (1930–1992), South African Army brigadier general
