= Hartvig Krummedige =

Danish nobleman

Hartvig Krummedige (also referred to in the Hartvig Erikssøn Krummedike and Hartvig Krummendick) was a Danish nobleman who was born circa 1400 in southern Jutland, Denmark and died in 1476 at Akershus Fortress, Norway.

== Family ==
The Krummedike family is initially mentioned in Holsten and is associated with the Krummendick castle at Itzehoe, Denmark (now Germany). The family long served in major roles in Denmark. Hartvig Krummedige was the son of Danish Steward of the Realm Erik Segebodssøn Krummedike (died in 1439) and Beate von Thienen. During the war between Denmark and Holstein in 1413 Hartvig's father proclaimed loyalty to Eric of Pomerania, King of Norway (1389–1442), elected King of Denmark (1396–1439), and of Sweden (1396–1439). Since Denmark did not prevail in that conflict, Erik's father lost his Holsten manor and territory but his loyalty earned him strong positions including Chancellor of the Danish Realm in 1417.

His first wife was Katarina Buck, the daughter of Markvard Buck and Sigrid Galle. His second marriage was to Karen Andersdatter Hak. His third marriage was to Anne Henriksdatter. He shared his fathers strong loyalty to Danish royalty.

He was Henrik Krummedike’s father by Karen Andersdatter Hak.

== Career ==
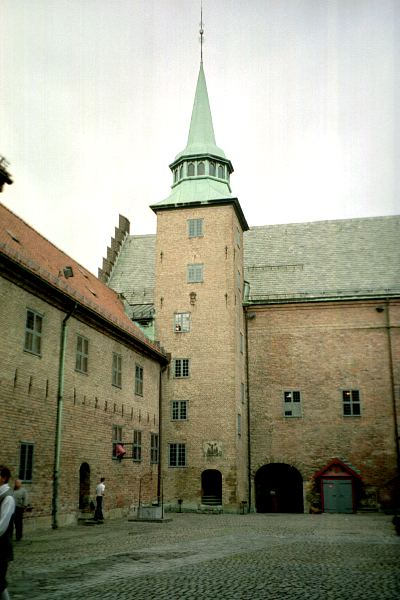
Akershus Castle

=== Early years in Norway ===
Hartvig spent much of his career in Norway, initially appearing there in 1430 as the fief holder at Lister where he was known for his organization and fairness. He next appears in the records as the fiefholder for Hardanger. He was placed in charge of Akershus fortress in 1445, following Sigurd Jonsen. He held that command until 1476, during which period the catapults were replaced with cannons and the secular ruler in Akershus fortress gained ascendancy over the Bishop of Oslo. Gjerset indicates that:

“…the Danes were gaining ascendancy. Many Danish nobles and courtiers flocked to Norway and as royal favors were always accorded them whenever opportunity presented itself, these dashing foreigners with wealth and titles soon elbowed their way to the foremost positions in the land… Hartvig Krummedige, under Christian I, became the richest man in Norway.”

=== The struggle between pro-Swedish and pro-Danish factions ===
Upon the 1448 death of King Christopher of Bavaria, who was union king of Denmark (1440–1448), Sweden (1441–1448) and Norway (1442–1448), the Norwegian succession resulted in controversy. In Norway the new king had to be elected by the Norwegian National Council. There were effectively two parties in the Norwegian National Council: The pro-Danish party led by Hartvig Krummedige (then the commandant at Akershus) and Bishop Jens of Oslo, and the pro-Swedish party by the Archbishop Alsak Bolt and Erik Saemundsson (then the commandant at Tønsberg Fortress). The pro-Danish party prevailed and Christian I of Denmark was elected king.

=== Karl Knutsson’s invasion ===
The election did not settle the matter. Karl Knutsson invaded from Sweden and proceeded to Hamar, where he called a thing, and was “elected king” by Archbishop Bolt, Erik Saemundsson and others who assembled there. King Karl proceeded to Trøndelag. He then returned to Sweden, leaving Saemundsson as viceroy. Saemundsson invested Akershus, which was held by Krummedige, who still adhered to Christian I. Ultimately Saemundsson was probably killed by orders of Krummedige, the leading pro-Swedish advocates fled to Sweden, and Karl Knutsson renounced his claim to the throne.

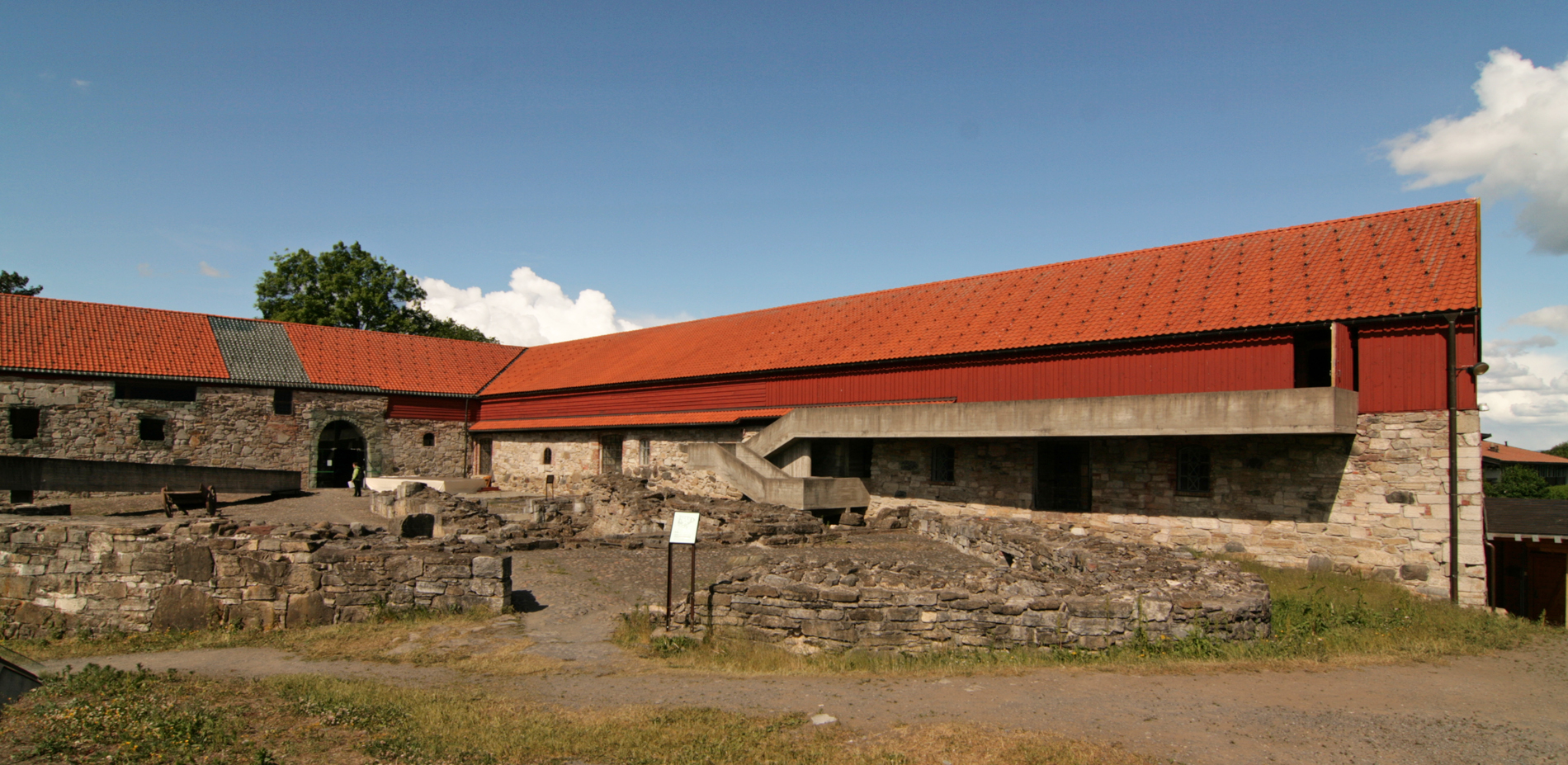
Ruins of medieval Hamar Bishop's palace.

Swedish forces again invaded Trøndelag in 1453, but were repelled and were forced to turn south across the Dovrefjell and to Hamar, where they captured and occupied the Bishop's palace. Hartvig Krummedige proceeded north, expelled the Swedish forces, and killed many of them.

=== The origin of the Krummedige-Tre Roser feud ===
Saemundsson and Knutsson were members of the Tre Roser family; the title comes from their coat of arms, which displays three roses. With Krummedige's recapture of the Hamar Bishop's palace, as well as his previous involvement in the death of Saemundsson, he earned the lasting enmity of the pro-Swedish knight, Alv Knutsson.

Alv Knutsson had extensive holdings, over 276 farms in east and south Norway, and could bring substantial pressure to bear. He arranged that charges be brought against Hartvig Krummedige by one of the local farmers. An ally of Knutsson's the new Bishop of Oslo, Gunnar Holke, obtained a Papal Bull concerning Krummedige's misuse of power. The basis for this was that he misused his power to harm the church; there was some basis in the charge as he had retained the Bishop's Palace at Hamar from the spring when he recaptured it after evicting the Swedes until that fall, and had collected the rentals which came due with the harvest. As a result, Hartvig Krummedige suffered a major setback, losing all of his fiefs in Norway in 1458.

=== Return to Norway ===
In spite of this dramatic setback, Christian I of Denmark restored Krummedige to Akershus by 1461. He remained there as the commander until his death in 1476.

== Death ==
Hartvig Krummedige died in 1476 at Akershus fortress, but his son Henrich remained a firm member of the pro-Danish party — his loyalty to the reigning Danish monarch resembled that of his father and grandfather.
