= Krummedige–Tre Rosor feud =

1448 to 1502 feud in medieval Norway

Krummedige-Tre Rosor feud
- Part of The Kalmar Union Wars
Date	1448-1502/1520
Location	Norway
Result	Victory for the Krummedige family

Belligerents
Krummedige family and allies	Tre Rosor family and allies

Commanders and leaders
Hartvig Krummedige; Henrich Krummedige	Alv Knutsson; Knut Alvsson

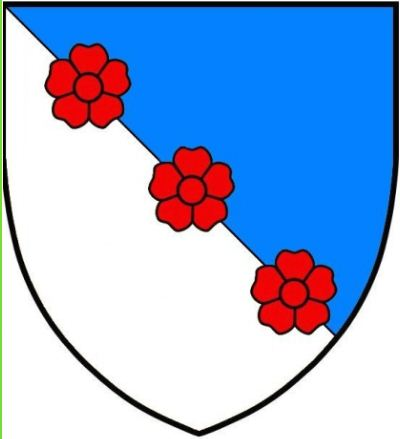
Modern reproduction of the coat of arms of the Tre Rosor family in Norway

The Krummedige-Tre Rosor feud was a feud that took place from 1448 to 1502 between the Norwegian noble families, Krummedige and Tre Rosor. The feud ended with the extinction of the male Tre Rosor line in Norway, and a stronger monarchy in Norway.

== Background ==
The feud started in 1448 after the death of King Christopher, who was union king of Denmark (1440-1448), Sweden (1441-1448) and Norway (1442-1448), the Norwegian succession resulted in controversy. In Norway the new king had to be elected by the Norwegian National Council. There were effectively two parties in the Norwegian National Council: The pro-Danish party (wanted Christian of Oldenburg as king) led by Hartvig Krummedige (then the commandant at Akershus Fortress) and Bishop Jens of Oslo, and the pro-Swedish party (wanted Karl Bonde as king) led by the Archbishop Alsak Bolt and Erik Saemundsson (then the commandant at Tønsberg Fortress).

The pro-Danish party prevailed and Christian I was elected king in 1450, although not without subsequent strife. In 1449 Karl Knutsson invaded from Sweden and proceeded to Hamar, where he called a thing, and was elected king by Archbishop Bolt, Erik Saemundsson and others who assembled there. King Karl I proceeded to Trøndelag. He then returned to Sweden, leaving Saemundsson as viceroy. Saemundsson invested Akershus fortress, which was held by Krummedige, who still adhered to Christian I. Ultimately Saemundsson was killed by Krummedige, the leading pro-Swedish advocates fled to Sweden, and Karl Knutsson renounced his claim to the throne, in 1450. Saemundsson were member of the Tre Rosor family, which title comes from their coat of arms, which includes three roses.

== Alv Knutsson and Hartvig Krummedige ==
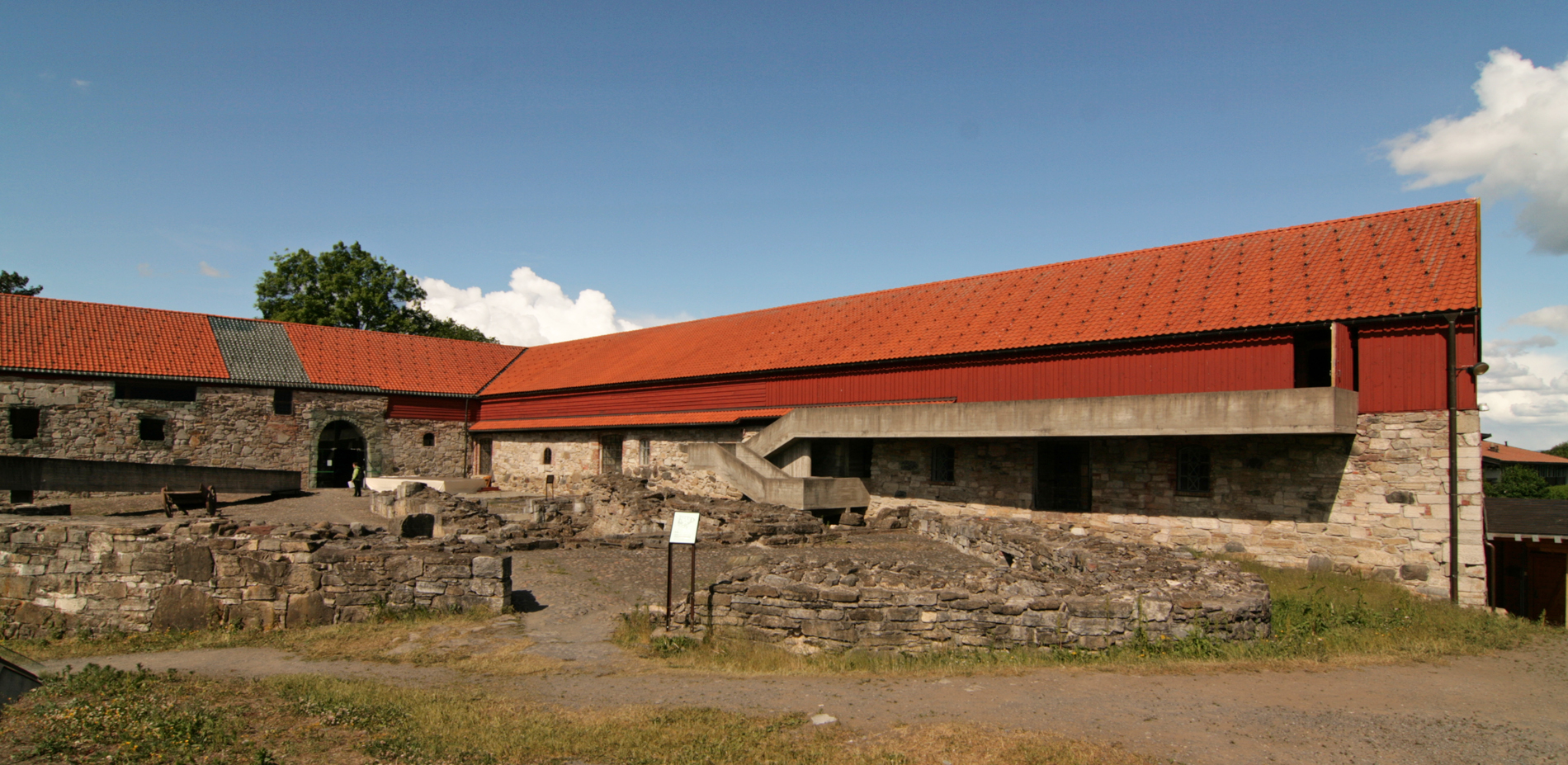
Ruins of medieval Bishop's palace (Hamarhus) in Hamar

Swedish forces again invaded Trøndelag in 1453, but were repelled and were forced to turn south across the Dovrefjell and to Hamar, where they captured and occupied the Hamar Bishop's palace (Hamarhus). Hartvig Krummedige proceeded north, expelled the Swedish forces, and killed many of them, including members of the Tre Rosor family. With this act, as well as his previous involvement in the death of Saemundsson, Krummerige earned the lasting enmity of pro-Swedish Alv Knutsson of Tre Rosor. Alv Knutsson had extensive holdings, was highly influential and could bring substantial pressure to bear. In 1455 he arranged that charges be brought against Hartvig Krummedige by one of the local farmers – as a result Hartvig Krummedige lost all of his fiefs, in 1458. Knutsson also worked through the Pope to obtain a Papal Bull concerning Krummedige's misuse of power. In spite of this dramatic setback, Christian I of Denmark and Norway restored Krummedige to Akershus by 1461. Hartvig Krummedige died in 1476, but his son Henrich Krummedige remained a firm member of the pro-Danish party — the rivalry with the Tre Rosor family virtually guaranteed this would be so. Alv Knutsson died in 1496.

== Knut Alvsson and Henrich Krummedige ==
Alv's son Knut Alvsson subsequently led an unsuccessful attempt to gain the crown of Norway. In 1500 King Hans of Denmark, Sweden and Norway made an ill-fated attempt to conquer Dithmarschen in Northern Germany. Knut Alvsson, who had married the granddaughter of Karl Knutsson, and was involved with the Swedish Independence Party, concluded it was time to act. His rebellion began in 1501 in Sweden, but soon came to Båhus Fortress in Norway on the Swedish-Norwegian border, which Henrich Krummedige commanded. Krummedige held his fief at Båhus, but Alvsson captured Akershus Fortress in March 1502, although the citizens of Oslo remained pro-Danish while the nobles and bishops of the country remained neutral—presumably waiting to see which side prevailed.

King Hans dispatched his son Christian (later crowned King Christian II of Denmark and Norway) at the head of forces; they relieved the siege of Båhus Fortress, and then captured and reduced Älvsborg Fortress across the river from Båhus Fortress in Gothenburg, Sweden. Krummedige then led forces north to finish off the rebellion by recapturing Tønsberg Fortress and invested Akershus Fortress, which Alvsson was defending.

When it became clear that the rebellion had failed, Alvsson came on board one of Krummedige's ships under a safe conduct. Krummedige killed Knut Alvsson, either by treachery or, as alleged, in response to Alvsson's own violence. Alvsson was judged a traitor and Alvsson's property was forfeit to the crown. Krummedige had prevailed, although he was compelled to leave Norway and the uprising was not totally quelled until 1504. This ended the male Tre Rosor line in Norway and the feud.

== Aftermath ==
Norwegian attempts at opposition against the Oldenburg kings were strangled, after the feud, by King Hans's son Prince Christian (afterward King Christian II), who was the viceroy of Norway from 1506. He succeeded in maintaining control of the country. During his administration of Norway, he attempted to deprive the Norwegian nobility of its traditional influence exercised through the Rigsraadet (privy council). Prince Christian became king of Denmark and Norway in 1513.

But the feud was not completely over with the murder of Knut Alvsson. Alvsson had two sons, Karl Knutsson and Erik Knutsson. Karl Knutsson continued the fued, and found favor with Christian II and used the opportunity to weaken Krummediges position. King Christian II removed Krummedige as the commander of Varberg Fortress as well as remove him from all his Norwegian fiefdoms. Because of this Krummedige began working on making Christians uncle Frederick king of Norway. In 1520 both Karl Knutsson and Erik Knutsson died, ending the family feud once and for all. In 1523 King Christian II was deposed as king of Norway, and in 1524 Frederick was elected the new king of Norway. In 1530 Henrich Krummedige died, he had no sons.
