= Roos af Hjelmsäter family =

Swedish noble family

Roos af Hjelmsäter
- Nobility
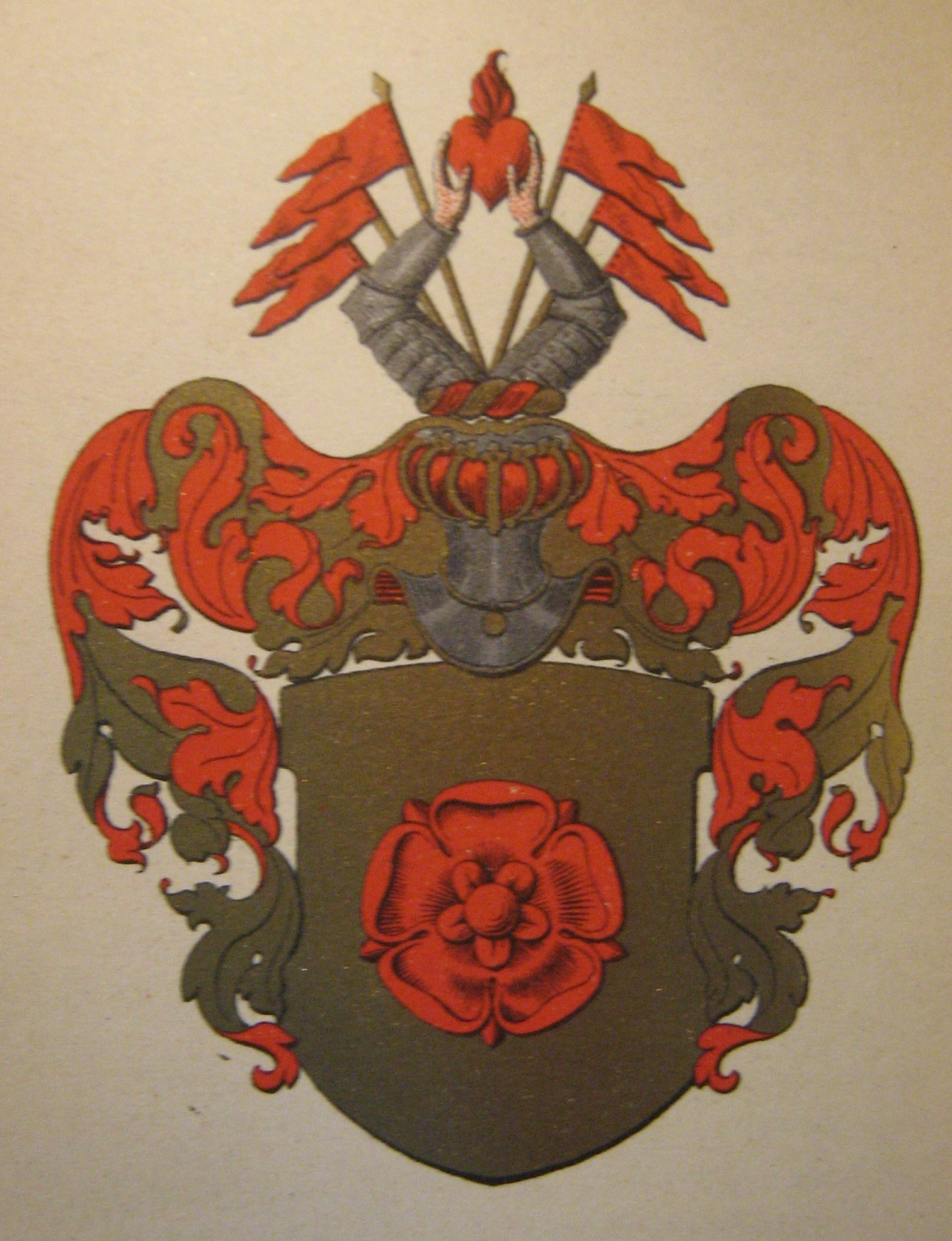
- Roos af Hjelsäter coat of arms
- Country: Norway; Sweden
- Place of origin: Sørum
- Founded: 1100s (Norway); 1300s (Sweden)
- Founder: Åge Varg (Norway); Håkon Jonsson (Sweden)
- Final head: Hans Sigurdsson (Norway); Axel Erik Roos (Sweden)
- Titles: Regent; Baron; Lendmann; Sysselmann; Friherre; Junker
- Estates: Sudreim; Giske estate Bjarkøy estate
- Dissolution: 1466 (Norway); 1765 (Sweden)

The Roos af Hjelmsäter family is a Swedish noble family of Norwegian noble and royal origin. It is among the few of Norway's medieval noble families still living.

== Sudreim clan in Norway ==
The coat of arms of Sørum in Akershus is derived from the arms of the medieval Sudreim clan

The Sudreim clan (Sudreimsætten) was originally a part of the Norwegian nobility. Its progenitor, lendmann Åge Varg of Sørum in Romerike (ca. 1110-ca. 1150), was married to a daughter of King Harald IV Gille of Norway.

Åge Varg was the paternal grandfather of Olav Mokk († ca. 1224), Sysselmann of Hedmark, who himself was the father of lendmann Ivar Olavsson of Skedjuhov († ca. 1240). The latter's son, Jon Raud Ivarsson of Sudreim (ca. 1245-ca. 1312), was the father of Havtore Jonsson († ca. 1320), who married King Håkon V's daughter Agnes Håkonsdotter. Their sons were Jon Havtoresson (ca. 1312–1395) of Elingård and Sigurd Havtoresson (ca. 1315-ca. 1390) of Sudreim.

Jon Havtoresson married Birgitta Knutsdotter († 1395) and was the father of Håkon Jonsson (1345-1391), who through inheritance and marriage, received extensive landlord in eastern Norway (in Borgarsyssel and Romerike) as well as in western Norway (in Agder). Håkon Jonsson was suggested as King of Norway after the death of King Olaf IV in 1387. He became the progenitor of the Roos af Hjelmsäter family of Swedish nobility.

Sigurd Havtoresson married Norway's richest heiress, Ingeborg Erlingsdotter, daughter of Erling Vidkunsson. He thereby came to possess the Giske and Bjarkøy Estate. Their daughter was Agnes Sigurdsdotter, who married the Swedish nobleman Jon Marteinsson (Stjerne) († ca. 1400). She was the mother of Sigurd Jonsson (Stjerne) († 1453) of Sudreim, Giske, and Bjarkøy. Sigurd Jonsson was Regent of Norway. As a royal descendant, he was offered the throne but rejected these suggestions. His son junker Hans Sigurdsson (Stjerne) († 1466) was the family's last man in Norway.

== Roos af Hjelmsäter in Sweden ==
Jon Havtoresson and Birgitta Knutsdotter were the parents of at least five children. According to Adelsvapens genealogi it was not their son Håkon Jonsson but rather his younger brother Brynjulf Jonsson († before 1422) who became the progenitor of the Swedish noble family Roos af Hjelmsäter.

The family was in 1625 introduced at the House of Nobility under the name Roos af Hjelmsäter as noble family no. 51. A branch was in 1705 created barons under the name Roos as baronial family no. 186. This line became extinct in 1765.

== Coat of arms ==
The family's coat of arms featured a red rose on a golden field.

== Prominent members ==
- Baron Axel Erik Roos
- Baron Carl Gustaf Roos

== See also ==
- Sudreim claim
- Norwegian nobility
- Swedish nobility
- Uradel

== Related reading ==
- Lillie Rollins Crawford, Robert Junious Crawford (1996) Roos af Hjelmsäter : a Swedish noble family with allied families and emigrants (Baltimore, Maryland : Gateway Press)
- Otto von Schwerin (2012) Coats of Arms of the Nobility in Sweden (Rhombus & Arena) ISBN 978-9163381119
