= Nyland and Tavastehus County Cavalry Regiment =

- Nylands och Tavastehus läns kavalleriregemente
- Active: 1618-1791
- Country: Sweden
- Branch: Swedish Army
- Type: cavalry regiment
- Engagements: First battle of Breitenfeld; Siege of Nuremberg; Battle of Lützen (1632); Battle of Wittstock; Second battle of Breitenfeld

Commanders
- Notable commanders: Torsten Stålhandske

The Nyland and Tavastehus County Cavalry Regiment (Swedish: Nylands och Tavastehus läns kavalleriregemente) was a Swedish Army cavalry regiment located in the county of Nyland and Tavastehus that traced its origins back to the 17th Century. It was split in 1791.

== History ==
The regiment has its origin in the Nyland cavalry (Swedish: Nylands ryttare) raised in 1618. In 1632, this unit was organized into a cavalry regiment. The regiment's soldiers were conscripted mainly from the county of Nyland and Tavastehus.

It was one of the original eight Swedish cavalry regiments mentioned in the Swedish constitution of 1634. Its men were Finns (known as Hakkapeliitat) and it placed sixth in the order of precedence. |The regiment's first commander was Torsten Stålhandske. F

In the spring of 1700, the regiment was transferred to General Wellingk's army corps in Swedish Livonia. From 1702 on, the regiment, with six of its eight companies, had joined the main army. In 1705–1706 it was part of Carl Gustaf Rehnskiöld's corps. After the Battle of Poltava in 1709, the regiment was present at the capitulation in Perevolochna. The regiment had to be completely reraised. It was then stationed with the army in Finland. The regiment was part of General Armfeldt's army of 7,500 men which invaded Norway through Jämtland in August 1718.

The cavalry regiment was reorganized into Nyland and Tavastehus dragoon regiment in 1721. In 1791, the regiment was converted to infantry. The northern battalion was incorporated into Tavastehus county infantry regiment as its third battalion, while the southern battalion was incorporated into Nyland Infantry Regiment.

== Campaigns ==
- The Thirty Years' War 1630–1648
- The Great Northern War 1700–1721

== Organization ==
1690(?)

- Södra bataljonen
  - Livskvadronen
  - Majorens (Borgå) skvadron
  - Helsing skvadron
  - Raseborgs skvadron
- Norra bataljonen
  - Överstelöjtnantens skvadron
  - Nedre Hållola Skvadron
  - Övre Hållola Skvadron
  - Säxmäki Skvadron

== Commanding officers ==
- 1625–1632 Åke Tott
- 1632–1644 Torsten Stålhandske
- 1644–1656 Henrik Horn
- 1656–1669 Johan Galle
- 1669–16?? Claes Uggla
- Baranoff.
- 1678–1687 Otto Vellingk
- 1687–1700 Johan Ribbing
- 1700–1701 Adrian Magnus Klingsporre
- 1701–1706 Didrik Fredrik Patkull
- 1707–1709 Anders Torstenson (1676-1709) †
- 1709–1713 Anders Erich Ramsay
- 1713–1724 Reinhold Johan De la Barre
- 1725–1728 Axel Erik Roos
- 1728–1739 Carl Henrik Wrangel
- 1739–1742 Johan Carl Ramsay
- 1743–1746 Gustaf Gynterfelt
- 1746–1759 Lars Åkerhielm
- 1759–1762 Herman Fleming
- 1762–1767 Gustav Crispin Jernfeltz
- 1768–1769 Casimir Lewenhaupt
- 1769–1772 Jakob Magnus Sprengtporten
- 1772–1776 Johan von Schwartzer
- 1776–1777 Erik Johan Stjernvall
- 1777–1779 Georg Gustaf Wrangel af Adinal
- 1779–1791 Robert Montgomery

== Various ==
Names
Nylands ryttare	Nyland's horsemen	1618	–	1632
Nylands och Tavastehus läns kavalleriregemente	Nyland and Tavastehus County Cavalry Regiment	1632	–	1721
Nylands och Tavastehus dragonregemente	Nyland and Tavastehus Dragoon Regiment	1721	–	1791

Designations
none	–

Training grounds and garrison towns
Poltinaho, Hämeenlinna	–	1791

== See also ==
- List of Swedish regiments
- List of Swedish wars
- History of Sweden
- Provinces of Sweden
