= Gestad =

Parish in Vänersborg Municipality, Sweden

Coordinates: 58.54748°N 12.44796°E

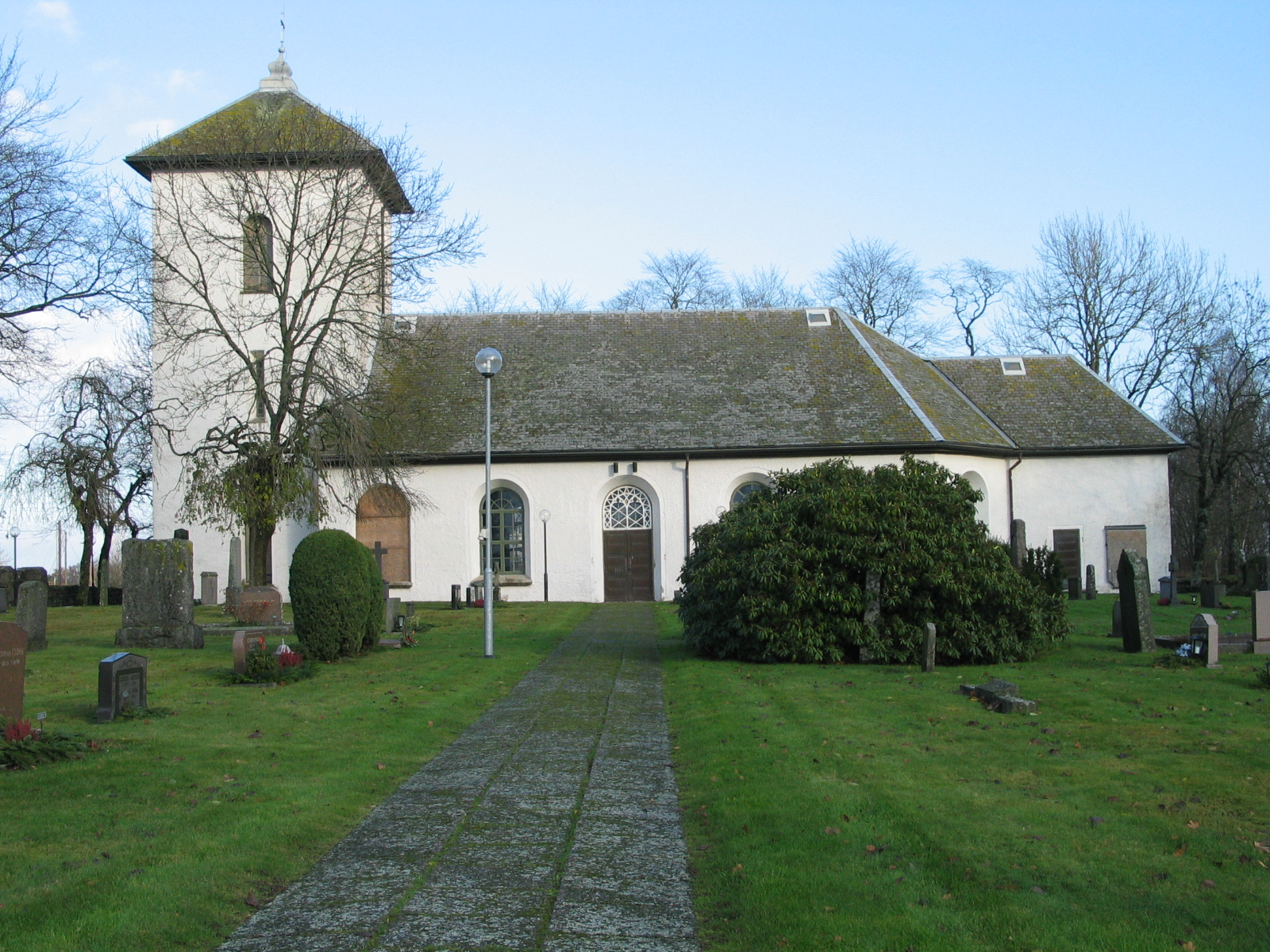
The Gestad Church

Gestad (Swedish pronunciation: [ˈjêːsta]) is a parish in the Dalsland part of Vänersborg Municipality, Sweden, located about 20 km north of the city of Vänersborg and 10 km east of the village Brålanda. The parish includes both farmland and forests. It has its border with the great lake Vänern in the east and is in the middle of Dalbo plain.

At the location of a former church (300 m north of the present church) there is a monument in honor to the old church and of Lieutenant General Axel Erik Roos, who is buried on the site. The monument was erected in 1919. Roos was an officer in the army of King Karl XII and is well known for having three times the same day saved the life of the king during the so-called kalabaliken (skirmish) in Bender, Moldova. Gestad was previously dominated by the manor Lövås situated around 1 km southeast of the church. The parish was previously known for the extensive cultivation of oats. Oats were exported in the late 19th century, to a large extent, inter alia, to the London area (horse fodder). The Gestad area has been characterised by the words: "Heaven and oats".

Church attendance has previously been high in Gestad. In the parish there are two churches belonging to the Church of Sweden - Gestad and Timmervik churches - and also a mission chapel that is of interest.

In Gestad church, built 1796-1799 and consecrated in 1800, is a very old baptismal font ("dopfunt") in sandstone. It is known that it was made sometime in the 12th or 13th century. There is also a ”dopfat” made in Nuremberg, Germany at the end of the 15th century, donated to the church by General Roos´ family.

The church previously stored general Roos´ sword and spurs, but these were stolen in a burglary in the 1980s and have never been found. The painting over the altar was added in 1914 and is a drawing by Hj Tessing. The painting shows when Jesus walked on water.

Every year, in early July, there is a major meeting in Gestad with the display of tractors and ploughing.

The author Per Olof Ekström (1926–1981) was born, raised and lived in Gestad. He engaged in farming while he was also a writer. Ekström wrote nearly 50 books. Best known to the general public is the book Sommardansen, which formed the basis for the movie One Summer of Happiness (Hon dansade en sommar). The book reflects, in literary form, the mood among rural youth in the late 1940s.

Near the church, at a place named Murängen, has been found the foundations of a larger building. One theory is that there was a larger courtyard country manor from the Viking Age, or some time later. The manor probably also had a smaller church or chapel. A major archaeological excavation took place in the years 1986 to 1990.

Sikhall bathing place, and camping is in the parish.

The school of Skerrud covers grades 1 to 6.
