= Alv Knutsson =

Norwegian nobleman

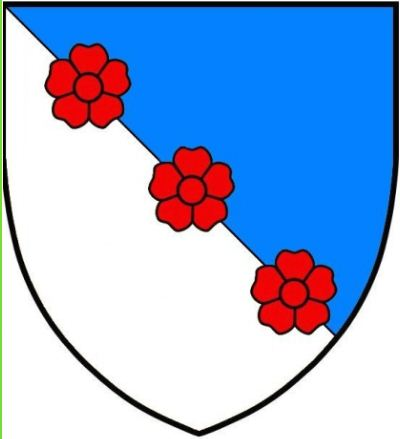
Modern reproduction of the coat of arms of the Tre Rosor family in Norway

Alv Knutsson (c. 1420–1496) was a Norwegian nobleman who descended on his father's side from the influential and wealthy Swedish Tre Rosor noble family. He was a member of the Norwegian council of the realm and also served as commander of the royal castle in Bergen. Alv Knutsson is most famous for his involvement in the Krummedige-Tre Rosor feud. He was the father of the Norwegian rebel leader Knut Alvsson.

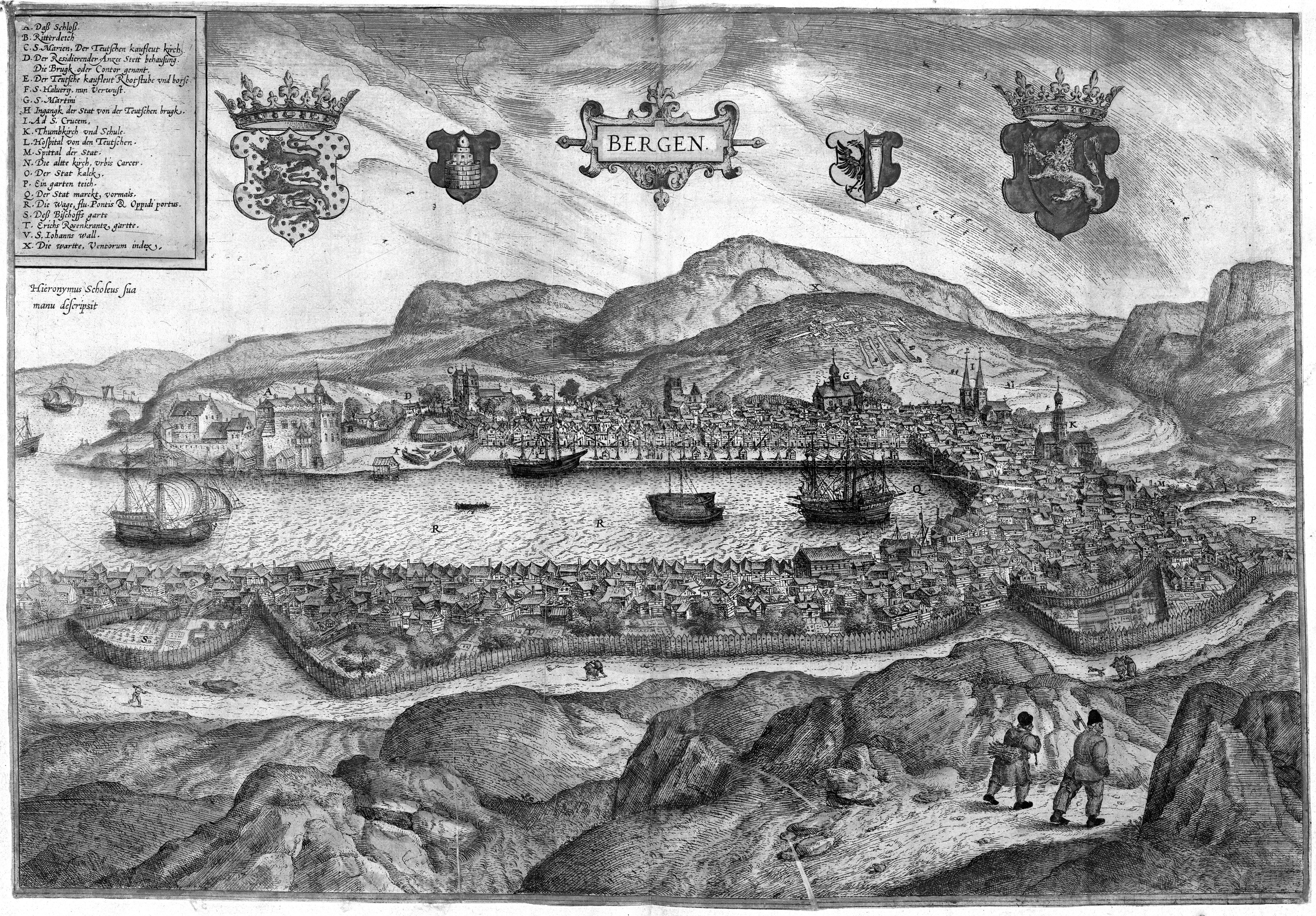
Alv Knutsson commanded Bergenhus fortress in Bergen — print from 1580 shows fortress to left.

== Landholdings ==
Alv Knutsson held over 276 farms in east and south Norway. He held important Norwegian fiefs including Solør and was one of the largest property holders in Norway inheriting part of the knight and Norwegian National Councillor Sigurd Jonsson’s vast properties, including the Sørum estate (Sudreim) in Romerike and Giske estate in Sunnmøre. His wife Magnhild Oddsdatter (ca. 1425–1499) from Finne in Voss was the widow of Bengt Harniktsson who died ca. 1446. Through his marriage, Alv Knutsson also held Grefsheim in Hedmark.
