= Carl Gustaf Roos =

- Friherre
- Full name: Carl Gustaf Roos
- Born: 1655
- Died: 1722 (aged 66–67); On the way home from Moscow
- Noble family: Roos af Hjelmsäter
- Occupation: Major General of the Carolean Swedish Army

Carl Gustaf Roos (before 1705, Carl Gustaf Roos af Hjelmsäter; 1655–1722) was a friherre and Major General of the Carolean Swedish Army.

After his military education in a foreign army – according to the custom of that time – Carl Gustaf Roos participated in Charles XI of Sweden's war against Denmark. After Charles XII's accession to the Swedish throne he served the new king in battle. Roos distinguished himself at the battle of Narva in 1700 and was promoted to colonel, as well as head of the Närke-Värmland Regiment in 1701.

Roos was elevated to friherre in 1705. He had until then had the cognomen Roos af Hjelmsäter, but after his elevation became known simply as "Roos".

In 1706 Roos was promoted to Major General and participated as such in the battle of Poltava on 28 June 1709. During the course of this battle he was captured, and was later taken to Moscow as a prisoner. Roos died in 1722 on his way home from his release from captivity after the 1721 treaty of Nystad.

Roos was the father of Lieutenant General Axel Erik Roos (1684-1765), who also participated in the Great Northern War.
