= Sigurd Jonsson =

Norwegian nobleman, knight and regent

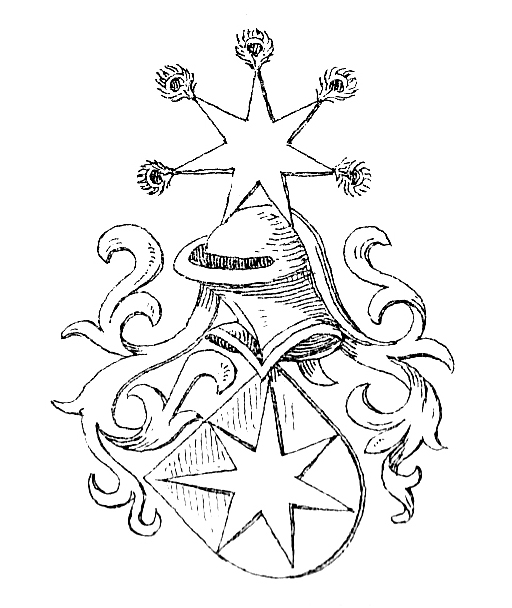
- Coat of arms of Sigurd Jonsson (modern reproduction)

Regent of Norway
- In office 1448–1449
- Preceded by: Christopher of Bavaria
- Succeeded by: Karl Knutsson

Regent of Norway
- In office 1439–1442
- Monarch: Erik of Pomerania
- Succeeded by: Christopher of Bavaria

Personal details
- Born: c. 1390
- Died: 1452–1454
- Spouse: Philippa of Eberstein
- Children: Hans Sigurdsson (died 1466)
- Parents: Jon Marteinsson (father); Agnes Sigurdsdotter (mother)
- Relatives: Agnes Haakonsdotter (great grandmother); Alv Knutsson (great nephew)
- Occupation: Nobleman, knight, feudal lord and statesman

Sigurd Jonsson (1390s – December 1452) was a Norwegian nobleman, knight and the regent of Norway during two interregnums in the mid-15th century.

== Background ==
Sigurd Jonsson was born at some point between 1390 and 1400. He was the son of the Swedish nobleman Jon Marteinsson (1340 – c. 1400) and Agnes Sigurdsdotter. Agnes was the great-granddaughter of King Haakon V of Norway through his illegitimate daughter, Agnes Haakonsdatter (1290–1319) and Havtore Jonsson (1275–1320). Sigurd Jonsson was the grandson and the heir of Sigurd Havtoresson (1315–1392), one of the two sons of Agnes Hakonardottir.

At the time of Sigurd's birth, Jon Marteinsson was a resident in Norway and a member of the Norwegian Council of the Realm (riksrådet). Sigurd grew up at the family's estate in Sudreim (modern Sørum), east of Oslo. He had two sisters, Catherine and Ingeborg, and a brother, Magnus, but his brother did not survive to reach maturity. Sigurd therefore inherited his father's estates, and also great landholdings from his mother's relatives.

== Career ==
Sigurd is first mentioned as a member of the Norwegian Council of the Realm in 1434. Sigurd was at the king's court in Visborg in Gotland when he was appointed, and he was at the same time made a knight by King Erik.

In 1440, the Norwegian Council of the Realm was compelled to follow the example of Sweden and Denmark and depose King Erik. Sigurd thus became the ruler of the country, as drottsete, during the interregnum while a new king was sought. Norway followed Denmark and Sweden in electing Christopher of Bavaria as the new king, thus maintaining the union between the three countries. After Christopher's coronation in Oslo on 2 July 1442, Sigurd relinquished the title of drottsete. During Christopher's reign, Sigurd remained a prominent member of the Norwegian Council. He was the commander of Akershus Fortress from 1440 to 1445, and one of the leading proponents of the anti-Hanseatic policies in Norway during King Christopher's reign. He was at this time probably the largest land-owner in Norway.

In January 1448, following the sudden death of King Christopher, Sigurd Jonsson resumed his role as ruler of the country. In a letter from June of the same year, he is referred to as the "guardian of the realm" (rikens forstandare). After King Christopher's death, Sweden and Denmark elected different kings, and there was discussion in Norway about choosing its own king as well. Sigurd Jonsson, being a direct descendant of King Haakon V, was the most likely candidate. However, he declined the opportunity and instead supported Christian I of Denmark as the new king of Norway. Christian prevailed over King Karl Knutsson of Sweden in July 1449. Despite this, part of the Norwegian council crowned Karl Knutsson as King, but he was unable to gain full control of southern Norway, where Sigurd Jonsson resisted him. Karl had to give up his claim to Norway, and Christian was crowned king of Norway in 1450. He is last mentioned in a letter from December 1452 and presumably died shortly after this.

Alv's mother was Agnes Alvsdatter who was the daughter of Catherine and Alv Haraldsson.

Sigurd Jonsson Born: 1390s Died: December 1452
Regnal titles
| Preceded by Christopher of Bavaria as King of Norway | Regent of Norway; 1448–1449 | Succeeded by Karl Knutsson as King of Norway |
| Preceded by Erik of Pomerania as King of Norway | Regent of Norway; 1439–1442 with Erik of Pomerania | Succeeded by Christopher of Bavaria as King of Norway |

== See also ==
- Sudreim claim

== Sources ==
- Hamre, Lars Norsk historie frå omlag år 1400 (Oslo, 1968)
