= Axel Erik Roos =

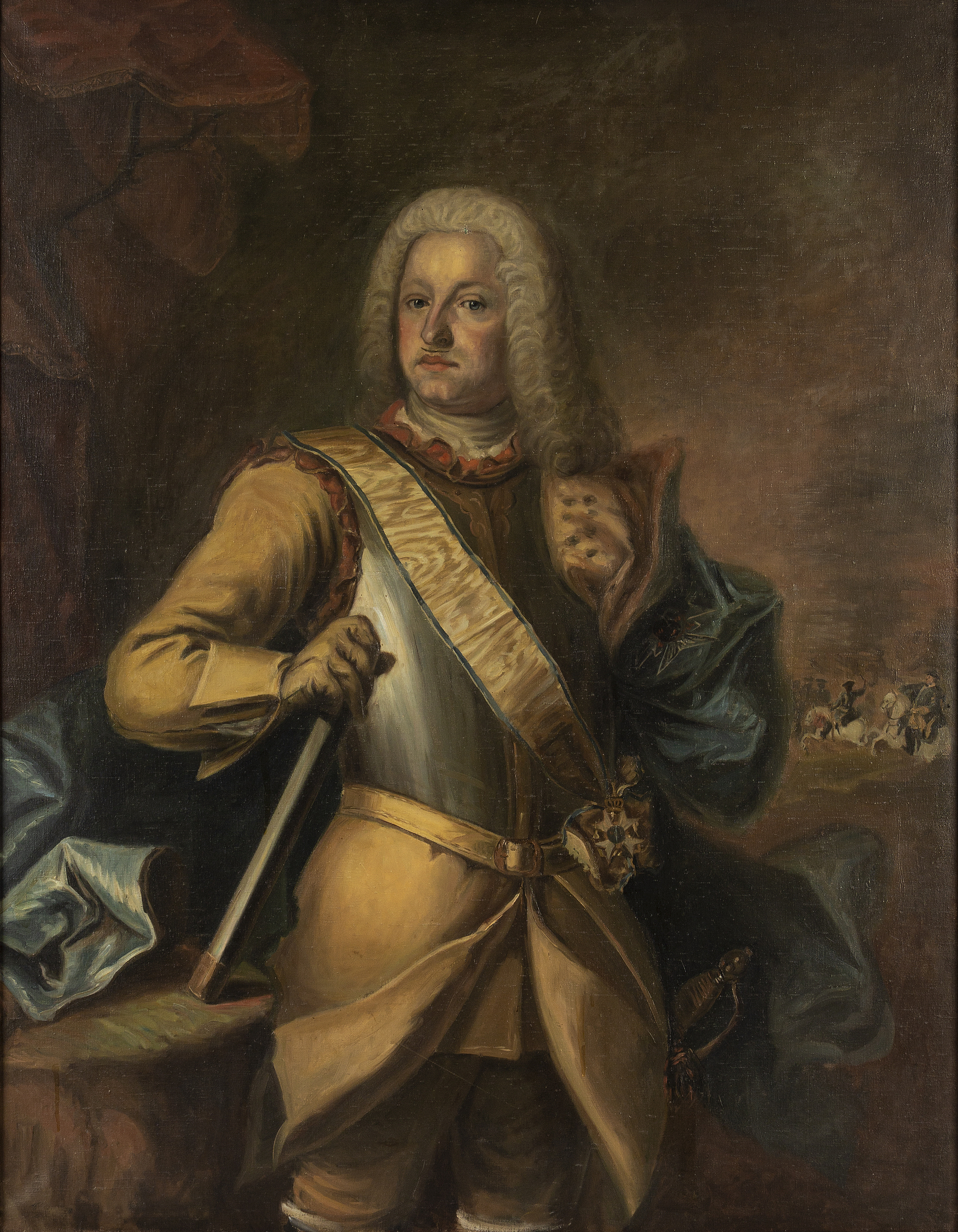
- Axel Erik Roos by Georg Engelhard Schröder
- Born: August 12, 1684; Årnas gård in Västergötland, Sweden
- Died: 14 December 1765 (aged 81); Lövås in Götaland, Sweden
- Burial place: Gestad Church Cemetery
- Spouse(s): Elisabeth Juliana Lilliehöök af Fårdala; Hedvig Charlotta Cronhielm of Flosta
- Military career
- Allegiance: Sweden
- Branch: Infantry; Cavalry
- Service years: 1700–1749
- Rank: Lieutenant-General
- Units: Södermanland Regiment; Närke-Värmland Regiment; Drabant Corps; Southern Scanian Cavalry Regiment
- Commands: Nyland-Tavastehus Cavalry Regiment; Bohuslän Dragoon Regiment
- Conflicts: Great Northern War; Landing at Humlebæk; Crossing of the Düna; Battle of Kliszów; Battle of Fraustadt; Battle of Poltava; Skirmish at Bender; Siege of Stralsund; Siege of Fredriksten

Axel Erik Roos (August 12, 1684 – December 14, 1765) was a baron, lieutenant general in the Swedish army of Charles XII of Sweden, and governor of Älvsborg County.

== Career ==
Roos was born in Årnäs in Västergötland and at 16 started as a page in the court of the two year older king Charles XII in 1700. He accompanied the king during the Great Northern War and participated in a number of battles. Roos was wounded at Kliszów and Fraustadt, was appointed second lieutenant in the Södermanland Regiment and, in 1707, lieutenant in the Närke-Värmland Regiment. He was appointed to the Drabant Corps in 1708 and accompanied the king to Bender after the surrender at Perevolochna. There he excelled himself being cited for brilliant bravery in the skirmish at Bender and saved the king's life three times in one day, including protecting the king with his own body. Roos gave a detailed account of the skirmish in a letter which he personally delivered to the Swedish Queen Ulrika Eleonora. The account was printed in 1757 and has since been reprinted on several occasions. The letter is considered to have great historical value and the original is kept in the National Archives of Sweden.

Roos was appointed adjutant general in 1713 and on the very same day as colonel in the South Scanian cavalry. Over the following years, Roos was employed by the king in several demanding and secret missions. During one such trip in 1716, he was captured by the Danish enemy, but managed to escape to Scania. He also participated in the 1718 siege of Fredriksten fortress in Norway, during which the king was killed. Roos was wounded 16 times in the Great Northern War campaign. The king had great confidence in him and called him "Roosen", and he was almost always in the king's immediate proximity during the war.

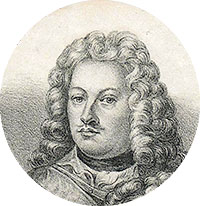
Axel Erik Roos

In 1725 he was promoted to major general and colonel of the Nyland cavalry brigade and the Tavastehus dragoons. In 1728, he was instead given command of the Bohus dragoons. In 1740, after a stint as military commander, he was appointed governor of Älvsborg County, finally retiring as a lieutenant general. He lived at Lövås manor in Gestad parish, Dalsland and died there at 81 years old, in 1766. His funeral assembled a large number of the most prominent nobles in the country. There, his life was described in a long speech by the member of parliament for Värmland, Lennart Magnus Uggla. The speech was distributed in printed form with the title: "Åminnelsetal öfver General, landshöfdingen mm Baron Axel Erik Roos."

It is considered that the man "Axel" in Esaias Tegnér's eponymous poem is Axel Erik Roos. The noble house of Roos came to an end with his death. Roos' sword and spurs were stored for nearly two hundred years in the church of Gestad until they were stolen in the 1980s during a burglary. They have not been recovered since.

== Personal life ==
Axel Roos was the son of general Carl Gustaf Roos who is known among other things, for his command of an infantry unit during the battle of Poltava. Two of his brothers were killed serving as officers during campaigns in Poland and Germany. It is said that Roos was not tall and that he kept his youthful looks to the end of his life. There are several portraits of him, including one in Karlberg Palace, Stockholm.
