= Agnes Haakonsdatter =

Illegitimate daughter of King Haakon V of Norway (1290–1319)

- Born: 1290
- Died: 1319 (aged 28–29)
- Spouse: Havtore Jonsson, Baron
- Issue: Jon Havtoresson; Sigurd Havtoresson
- House: Sverre (by birth); Sudreim (by marriage)
- Father: Haakon V of Norway
- Mother: Gro Sigurdsdatter

Princess Agnes Haakonsdatter of Norway (Old Norse: Agnes Hákonardottir; 1290 – 1319) was the oldest daughter of King Haakon V of Norway by Gro Sigurdsdatter, daughter of Sigurd Lodinsson and wife Baugeid Steinarsdatter and as such the prime heir.

However, as King Haakon V had somehow forgotten to officially marry her mother, prior to arranging Princess Agnes' conception, it was eventually decided that for political concerns, Princess Agnes and her descendants were moved 1 level down of the list of inheritance and her younger sister Ingeborg Haakonsdatter was moved 1 step up on the list inheritance. This meant that the Norwegian Throne would be passed through her younger sister Ingeborg Haakonsdatter, but that Princess Agness and her descendants remained the rightful heirs to the throne, if Ingeborg's line failed.

== Biography ==
In 1302, Agnes married Havtore Jonsson, Baron (1275 – 1320). He was son of Jon Ivarsson Raud (ca. 1245 – ca. 1312) of the Sudreim Clan (Sudreimsætten) in Romerike and wife Asa Haftorsdatter. Havtore was the Governor of Romerike and held eight estates and territories throughout Norway, including Borregård in Sarpsborg.

Their sons Jon Haftorson av Sudrheim (baron og Riksråd) and his brother Sigurd Havtoresson was collectively referred to as sons of Havtore (Havtoresønnene), and would become central persons in Norwegian politics. Jon Havtoresson (ca. 1312 – ca. 1390), married to Birgitta Knutsdotter Lejon (- Huseby, Onsøy, 1395), and Sigurd Havtoresson (ca. 1315 – ca. 1392) accessed influential positions during the reign of their half-cousin, King Magnus VII Ericson.

== See also ==
- Sudreim claim
- Norwegian nobility
