= Tønsberg Fortress =

Fortress in Norway

Tønsberg festning
- Tønsberg, Norway
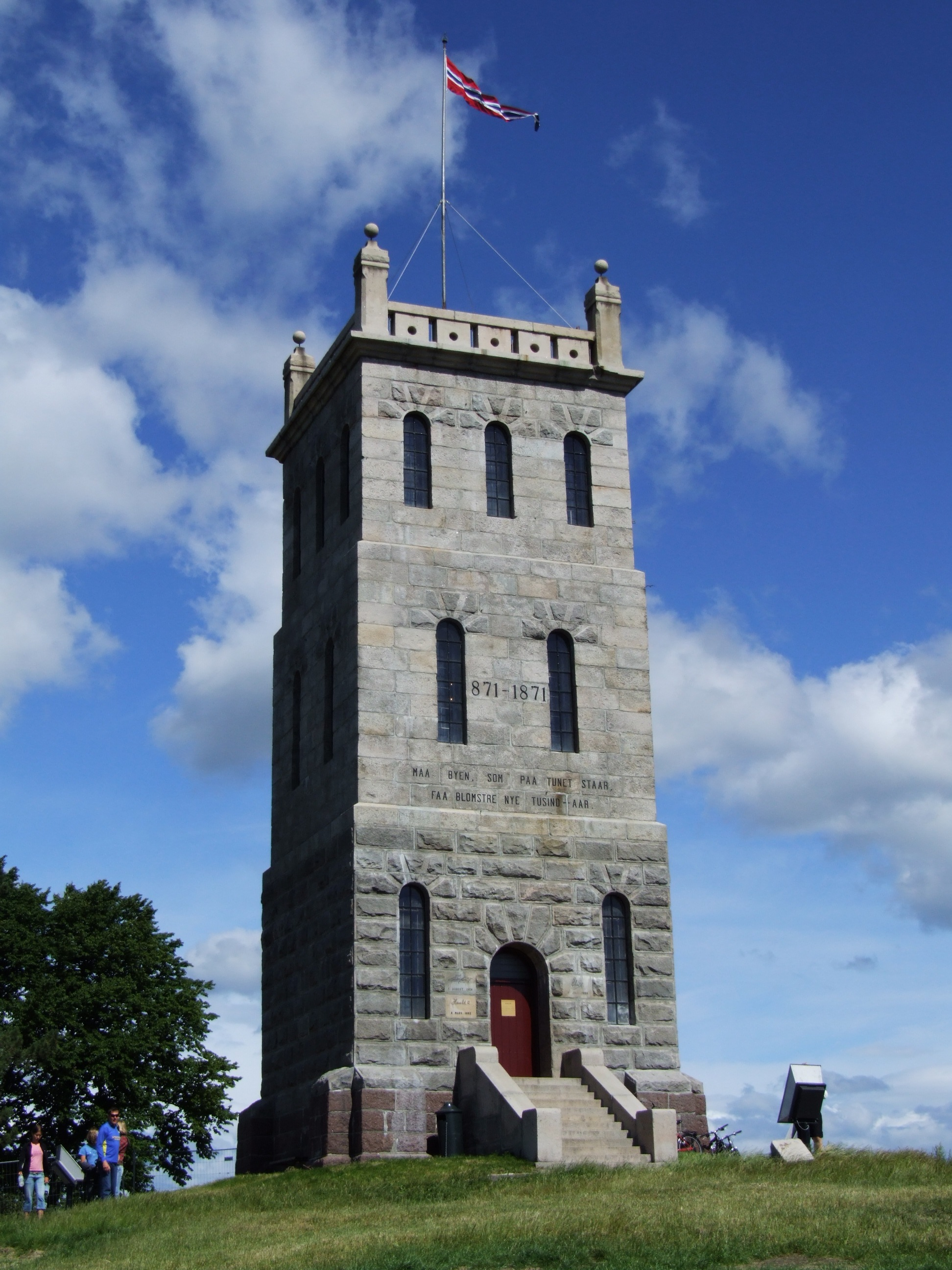
- Slottsfjellet

Site information
- Controlled by: Ynglings; Reidar Sendemann; Kings of Norway

Location
- Coordinates: 59°16′16.5″N 10°24′14″E

Site history
- In use: 871-1503

Garrison information
- Past commanders: Haakon Haakonson; Magnus Lagabøter; Haakon V Magnusson; Magnus Eriksson

Tønsberg Fortress (Tunsberghus festning) was a medieval fortress and castle, located in Tønsberg, Norway.

It includes ruins from Castrum Tunsbergis, Norway's largest castle in the 13th century, originally built by King Håkon IV, the grandson of King Sverre.

== History ==
Dating in 871, Tønsberg is commonly believed to have been the oldest Norwegian town and one of the oldest recorded fortified locations in Norway. According to Snorri Sturluson, Tønsberg was founded before the Battle of Hafrsfjord under which King Harald I of Norway united Norway under his rule. Tønsberg was an important trading center and site of the Haugating, the Thing (assembly) for Vestfold and one of Norway's most important places for the proclamation of kings. In the 13th century, King Haakon Haakonson built a castle, Tunsberghus, at the location of the modern Tønsberg municipality. It was located at what was formerly one of the most important harbors in Norway. The castle was greatly expanded during the reigns of Håkon Håkonsson and Magnus Lagabøte, who added large walls, towers, residential halls and a church. The last king of a fully independent Norway, Håkon V Magnusson, died at the castle in 1319.

The fortress was burnt down and destroyed by Swedish forces in 1503.

Only a few ruins of the fortress remain today. The modern-day tower (Slottsfjellet i Tønsberg) was raised in 1888 as a memorial of the historic fortress. In 1971, local authorities improved the insulation. At that time new plaques were mounted inside the tower. On the sides are the gilded signatures of three modern Kings of Norway: Haakon VII (1 August 1906), Olav V (1 July 1958) and Harald V (9 March 1992). The plaque over the entrance reads:

871-1871
Maa Byen som paa Tunet staar, faa blomstre nye Tusind-aar

871 - 1871
May the Town Which Stands on This Site Prosper for Another Thousand Years

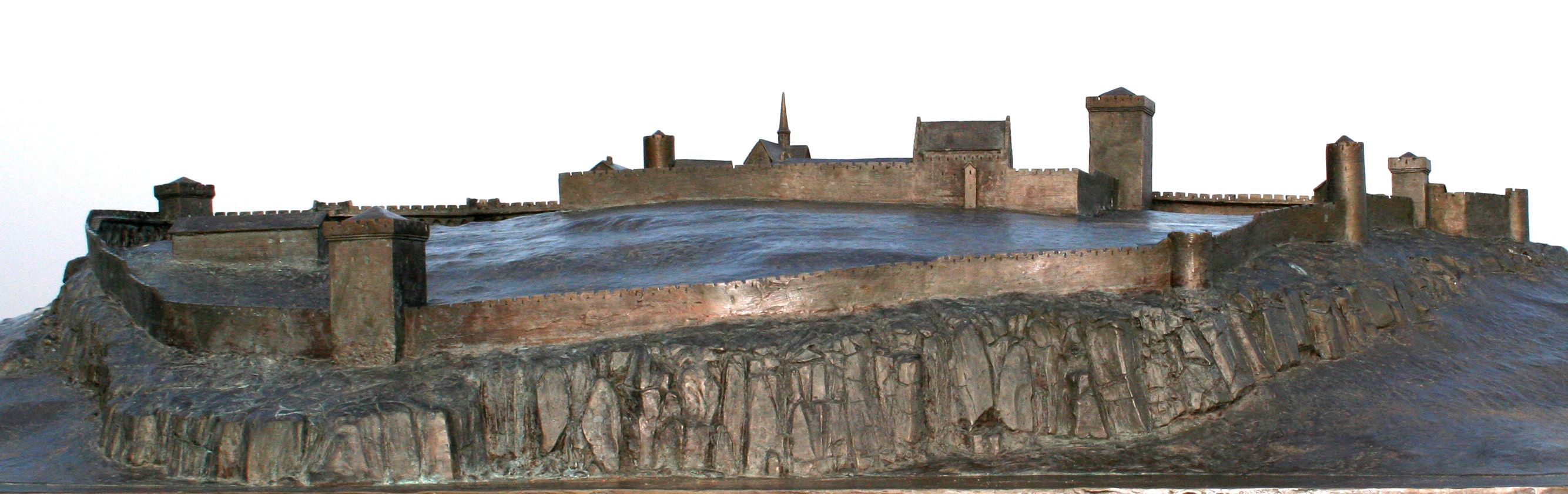
A model displaying how the castle might have looked like during the Middle Ages

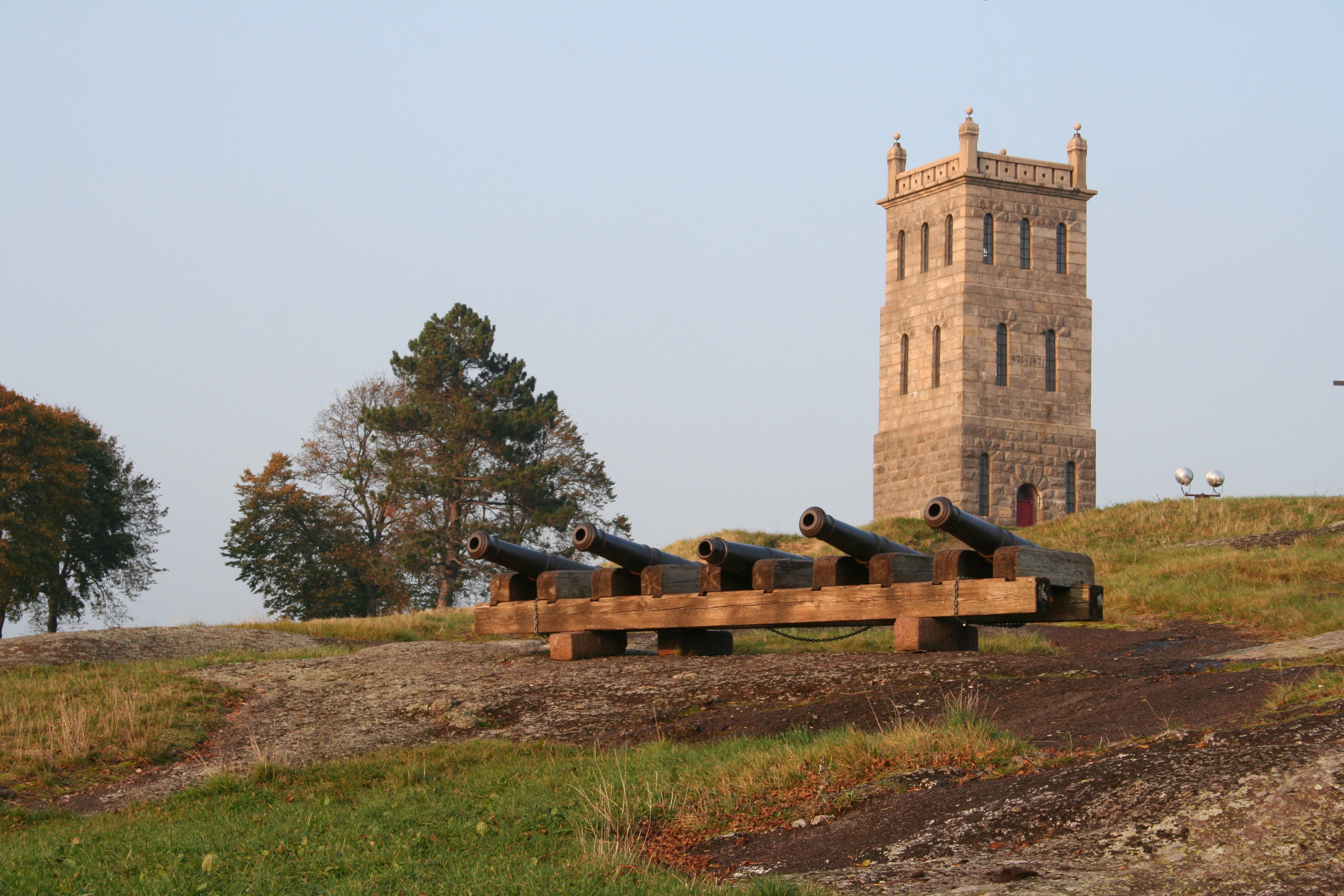
Slottsfjellet i Tønsberg

== Chronology ==
- 871 - The commercial town of Tunsberg existed. It served as a stronghold for the Ynglings, who first came to power in Vestfold in this period.
- 11th century - The commercial town and fortress at Tunsberg, on the Oslofjord outdistanced Skiringssal as a trading center.
- 1201 - Sverre Sigurdsson, king of Norway from 1177–1202, was attacked in Oslo by combined forces from the Oppland, Viken, Telemark and Tunsberg. Although they outnumbered Sverre's forces, they were defeated by Sverre's superior tactics. One of their ablest leaders, Reidar Sendemann, took refuge in the heights of Tunsberg mountain. In September 1201, Sverre lay siege with a force of 1000 men, forcing their surrender after 5 months. Unfortunately for Sverre, he took ill in the siege and returned to Bergen only to die later in 1202.
- 1253 - Haakon Haakonsson, king 1217-1263, constructed a castellated wall around the mountain and provided support buildings within the fortification.
- 1253 - Successfully resisted attack by Danish forces.
- 1261 - Magnus Lagabøter, king of Norway 1263-1280, brought his bride Ingeborg of Denmark to live in the castle.
- 1319 - Haakon V Magnusson, king 1299-1319, the last of the Harald-lineage (Haralds-ætten) lay ill and died at Tønsberghus.
- 1335 - Magnus Eriksson, king from 1319–1374, was wedded here to Blanche of Namur, who received the castle as a gift from her husband.
- 1387 - When the castles were no longer occupied by Norwegian royalty, the most important lords were the governors of the four chief Norwegian fortresses, Tønsberghus, Akershus, Båhus, and Bergenhus.
- 1503 - As the Kalmar Union collapsed, Norwegian attempts to rebel were suppressed by Danish forces. Tunsberghus fortress was destroyed by Swedish soldiers and disloyal local peasants.
- 1856 - Tønsberg Maritime Club built a wooden watchtower which burnt down in 1874.
- 1888 - Tunsberg Slottsfjellet, the present tower was built.

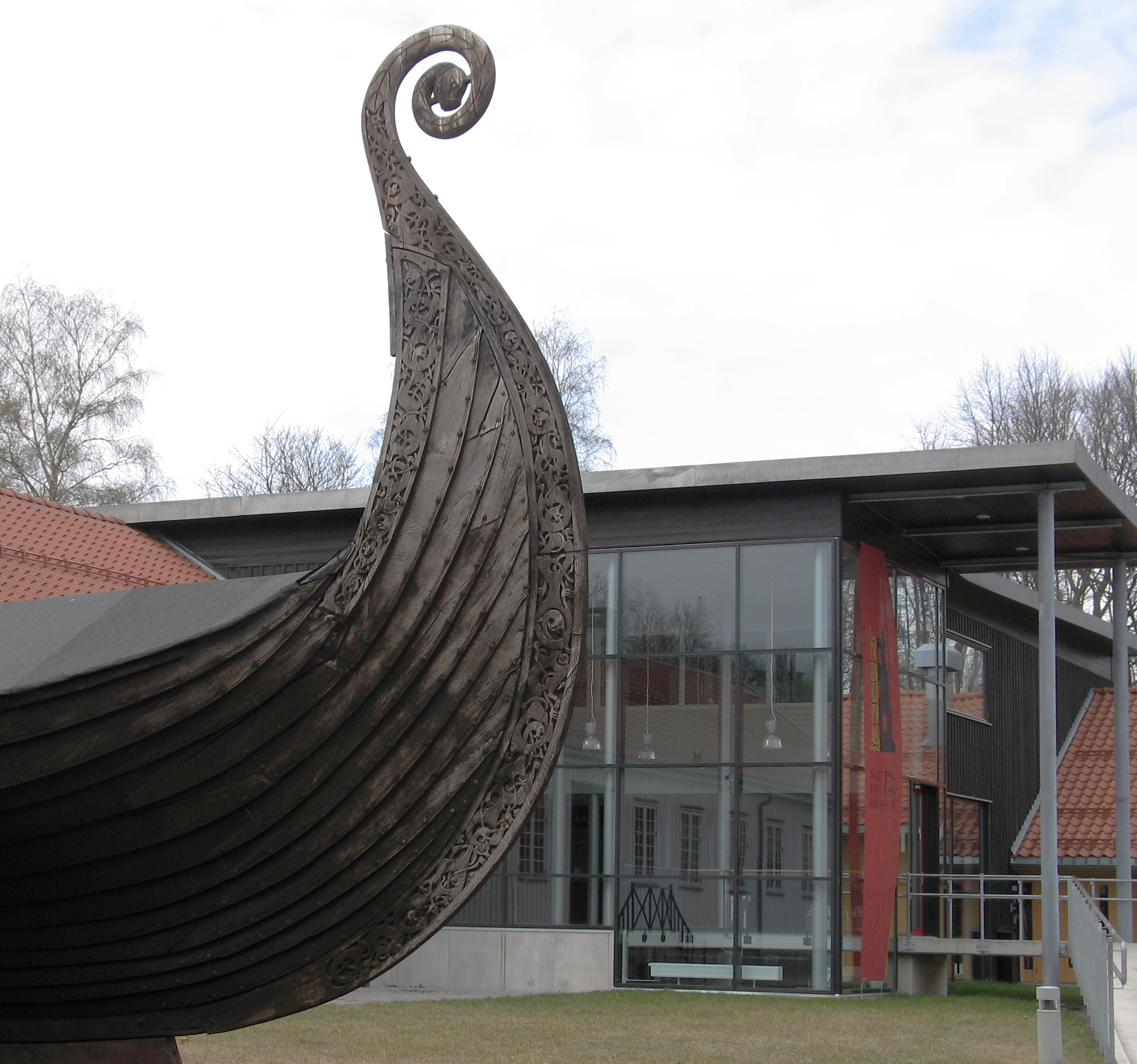
Main entrance of the Slottsfjell Museum

== Slottsfjellet Museum ==
Slottsfjell Museum (Slottsfjellsmuseet) was established in 1939 as the Vestfold Fylkesmuseum. It is now an associate of Vestfold Museum (Vestfoldmuseene). The exhibitions in the museum present Vestfold's cultural history with particular, emphasis placed on whaling and shipping, urban and rural history in Vestfold to World War II

== Other sources ==
- Gjerset, Knut History of the Norwegian Peoples (MacMillan, 1915)
- Larson, Karen A History of Norway (Princeton University Press, 1948)
