= Sudreim claim =

Claim to the Norwegian throne

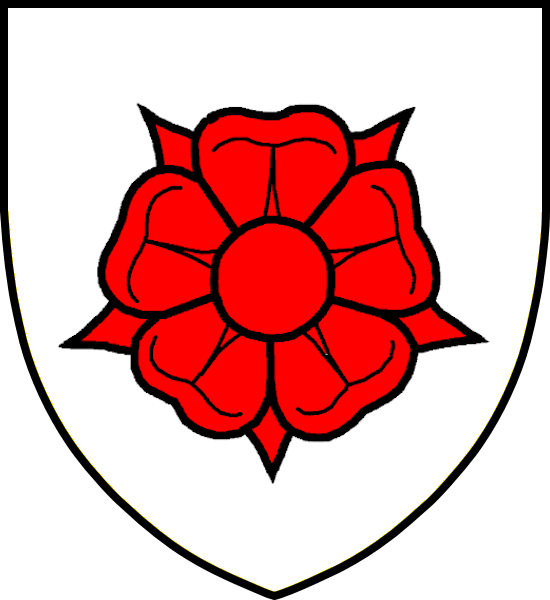

The modern-day coat of arms of Sørum municipality is based on the medieval coat of arms of the Sudreim dynasty.

The Sudreim claim is an entitlement to the throne of the Kingdom of Norway held among members of the powerful and influential House of Sudreim in the late Middle Ages.

== Background ==
In the early 14th century, when it was foreseeable that the male line of Sverre dynasty would go extinct, members of the Norwegian nobility arranged the Order of succession of the kingdom together with the then-king Haakon V of Norway. King Haakon's youngest daughter, Ingeborg Haakonsdatter instead of her older, illegitimate half-sister Agnes Haakonsdatter received recognized rights of succession for her descendants. This entitlement came to be referred to as the Stovreim claim (Stovreimsætten).

In the eventuality of Ingeborg's line dying out, it was determined that the issue and line of King Haakon's oldest daughter, Agnes Haakonsdatter, born to her in marriage to Havtore Jonsson (c. 1275–1319), would then be entitled to succession to the throne of Norway. This entitlement is referred to as the Sudreim claim (Sudreimsætten).

== Sudreim line ==
Ingeborg's descendants brought the kingship to union with Sweden, Denmark, and with a variety of Northern German principalities. Norway's kings from her lineage regularly resided elsewhere than in Norway. Nationalistic or separatist forces in Norway sometimes pursued having a native Norwegian king who was not to become any other country's ruler—and the descendants of Agnes Haakonsdatter lived in Norway. Accordingly, their ancient right to inherit the throne was claimed and sometimes was acted upon. Periodically a monarch died without any direct heirs as did Eric II of Norway in 1299, Olav IV of Norway in 1387 and Christopher of Bavaria in 1448. In each case, a near relative had to be found to become the successor. In certain cases some native-minded Norwegians offered the throne to a Sudreim descendant, but always unsuccessfully.

In the mid-14th century, Jon Havtoreson, (1312–1397) and Sigurd Havtoreson (1315–1392), sons of Agnes Haakonsdatter and Havtore Jonsson (referred to as Havtoresønnene), seem to have intrigued against their cousin Magnus VII of Norway (simultaneously King of Sweden), to take Norway from him. Haakon Jonson, son of Jon Havtoreson, is recorded as having been offered the throne in 1387–88, when Olav IV had died. Olav's mother, Queen Margaret I of Denmark, saved the situation for herself by taking a child, Bogislav of Pomerania (later renamed Eric, becoming Eric III, Eric XIII and Eric VII of countries of the Kalmar Union) to a session of the Norwegian council and presenting him as legitimate heir. Eric was a maternal great-grandson of Eufemia, daughter of Ingeborg Haakonsdatter and Duke Eric Magnusson. Eric was also the grandson of Queen Margaret's elder sister, Ingeborg, Duchess of Mecklenburg—and thus descended from recent kings of all three countries.

In 1448, when Christopher of Bavaria died, the Norwegian throne was offered to Sigurd Jonsson of Sudreim, who was a grandson and ultimately the heir of Sigurd Havtoresonn and his wife Ingebjorg Erlingsdottir of Bjarkoy—but he declined because legally King Eric was still the lawful king. Sigurd held combined hereditary rights of both Ingeborg Haakonsdatter's Stovreim line and Agnes Håkonsdatter's Sudreim line. The 1448 offer to the intended "Sigurd III" was made by more or less the same party who after his refusal, worked toward having Karl Knutsson from Sweden as Norway's king instead of Christian I of Denmark ignoring that King Eric was still the only lawful king of Norway although in exile.

In 1458, Eric III, Eric XIII and Eric VII, de-jure King of Norway, Sweden, Denmark, Wends and Goths and Duke of Pommerania, at the request of the Vice-Chancellor of Norway, certified for posterity that the House of Rosensverd remains the lawful and rightful successors as Kings in Norway.

The succession right was not limited in time.

== Notes ==
- "Agnes Håkonsdatter". Store norske leksikon.
- "Havtore Jonsson". Store norske leksikon.
- "Jon Havtoresson". Store norske leksikon.
- "Sigurd Havtoresson". Store norske leksikon.
- "Håkon Jonsson". Store norske leksikon.
- "Sigurd Jonsson". Store norske leksikon.
- "Alv Knutsson". Store norske leksikon.
- "Knut Alvsson". Store norske leksikon.
- "Görvel Fadersdotter". Store norske leksikon.
