= Haakon V =

King of Norway from 1299 to 1319

Haakon V Magnusson
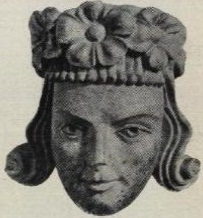
- Contemporary bust of Haakon (as duke) from the Stavanger Cathedral, dated to the 1280s.

King of Norway
- Reign: 15 July 1299 – 8 May 1319
- Predecessor: Eric II
- Successor: Magnus VII
- Born: 10 April 1270
- Died: 8 May 1319 (aged 49)
- Burial: St Mary's Church, Oslo, later moved to Akershus Castle
- Spouses: Isabelle de Joigny; Euphemia of Rügen
- Issue: Ingeborg, Duchess of Halland; Agnes Haakonsdatter
- House: Sverre
- Father: Magnus the Lawmender
- Mother: Ingeborg of Denmark

Haakon V Magnusson (10 April 1270 – 8 May 1319) (Old Norse: Hákon Magnússon; Modern Norwegian: Håkon Magnusson) was King of Norway from 1299 until 1319. He was the younger son of King Magnus IV and succeeded his elder brother Eric II. His reign marked the end of the "golden age" of medieval Norwegian history.

During his reign, Haakon sought to strengthen royal authority and the central administration, while Oslo grew in importance as a royal and administrative centre. He also oversaw the construction and strengthening of major fortifications, including Akershus Fortress and Bohus Fortress. Haakon was the last king in the male line of the House of Sverre. As he had no legitimate sons, he was succeeded in 1319 by his grandson Magnus Eriksson, who was also king of Sweden.

== Biography ==
Haakon was the younger surviving son of Magnus the Lawmender, King of Norway, and his wife Ingeborg of Denmark. Through his mother, he was a descendant of Eric IV, king of Denmark. In 1273, his elder brother, Eirik, was named junior king under the reign of their father, King Magnus. At the same time, Haakon was given the title "Duke of Norway", and from his father's death in 1280, ruled a large area around Oslo in Eastern Norway and Stavanger in the southwest, subordinate to King Eirik. Haakon succeeded to the royal throne when his older brother died without sons.

Haakon's eldest daughter was Princess Agnes Haakonsdatter, born out of wedlock in 1290 to Gro Sigurdsdatter, daughter of Sigurd Lodinsson and wife Baugeid Steinarsdatter.

In 1295, Haakon married his first wife, Isabelle, daughter of Jean I, Count of Joigny, but she died in 1297 without children.

In early 1299 he married his second wife, Euphemia, daughter of Vitslav II, Prince of Rügen. In 1301 she bore Haakon his younger daughter, Ingeborg Håkonsdotter. Since Haakon had not officially married Princess Agnes's mother, it was eventually decided that for political concerns, Princess Ingeborg's descendants were to be moved one step up the list of inheritance and Princess Agnes's descendants were to be moved one step down. This meant that the Norwegian throne would be passed first through the younger sister Ingeborg Haakonsdatter, but that Princess Agnes and her descendants still remained rightful heirs to the throne, if Ingeborg's line failed. It did not, however. In 1312 Ingeborg married duke Eric Magnusson of Sweden, a younger brother of King Birger of Sweden, and their son, Magnus Eriksson, would succeed Haakon V as king of Norway.

During Haakon's reign, Oslo gradually took over the functions of capital of Norway from Bergen, though there was no official pronouncement of this at any time. Haakon is also associated with the construction of Akershus Fortress (Akershus Festning) and Bohus Fortress (Båhus festning). During his reign he revived his brother's war policy against Denmark, but in 1309 he finally concluded a peace that in general was the end of a period of Dano-Norwegian wars. In domestic matters he energetically and successfully tried to limit the power of the magnates and to strengthen the king's power.

In 1319, Haakon was succeeded by his daughter's son, Magnus VII, who was an infant. Haakon's daughter Ingeborg was recognized as formal regent of her son. Havtore Jonsson was put in the guardianship government until he himself died the following year.

Haakon was buried in St. Mary's church (Mariakirken) in Oslo. Remains of two people, deemed to be Haakon and Eufemia, were discovered during excavations of the ruins of that church and reinterred in the royal mausoleum at Akershus Castle.

== Ancestry ==
Ancestors of Haakon V

Haakon III of Norway
Haakon IV of Norway
Inga of Varteig
2. Magnus VI of Norway
Skule Bårdsson
Margaret Skulesdatter
Ragnhild
1. Haakon V of Norway
Valdemar II of Denmark
Eric IV of Denmark
Berengaria of Portugal
3. Ingeborg of Denmark
Albert I, Duke of Saxony
Jutta of Saxony
Agnes of Austria

== Gallery ==
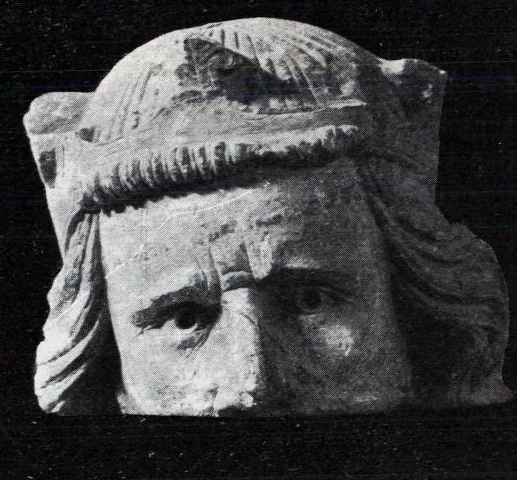
Head from Nidaros Cathedral, considered to possibly represent an older Haakon.

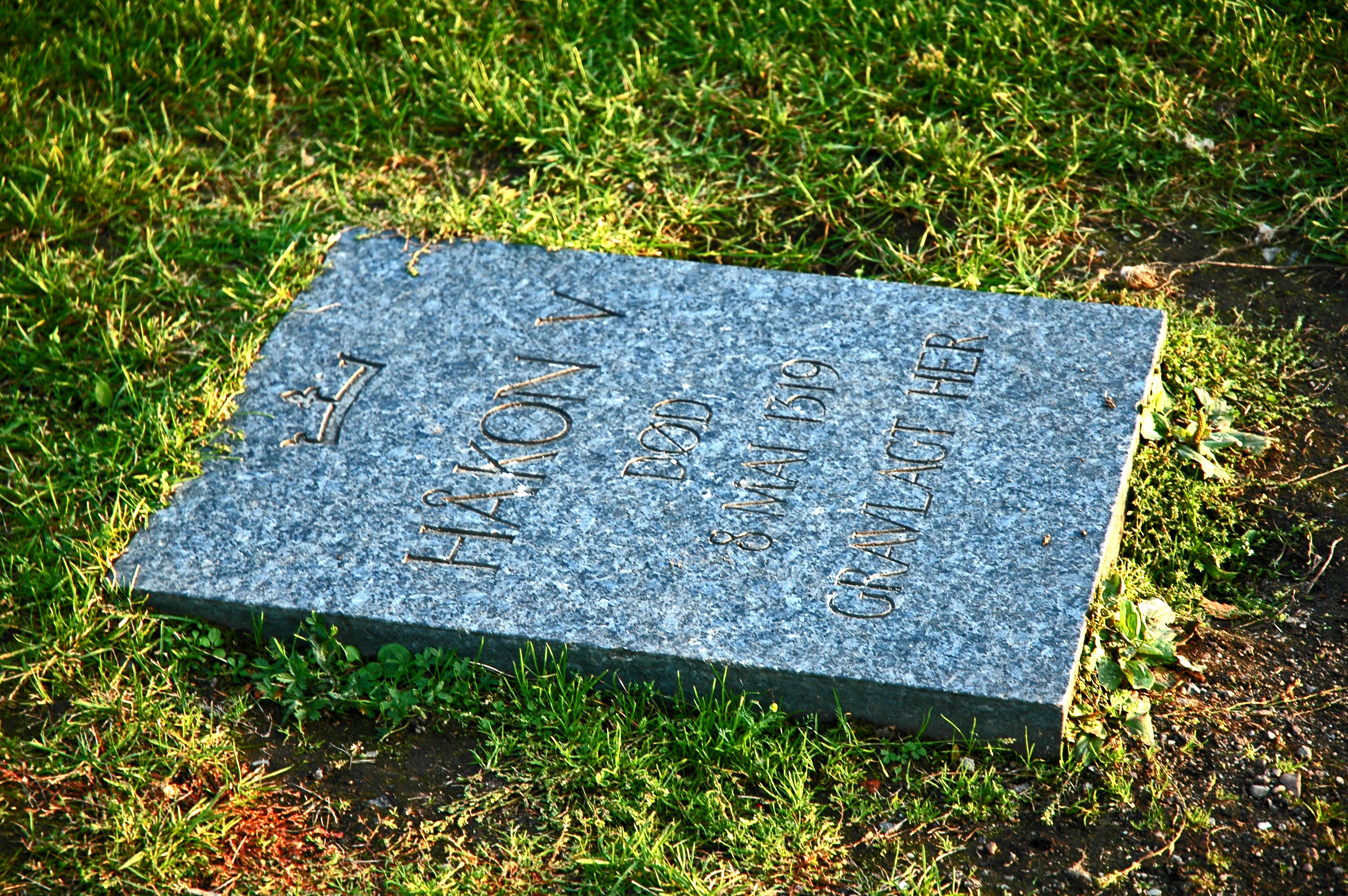
Burial site of Haakon V in Oslo

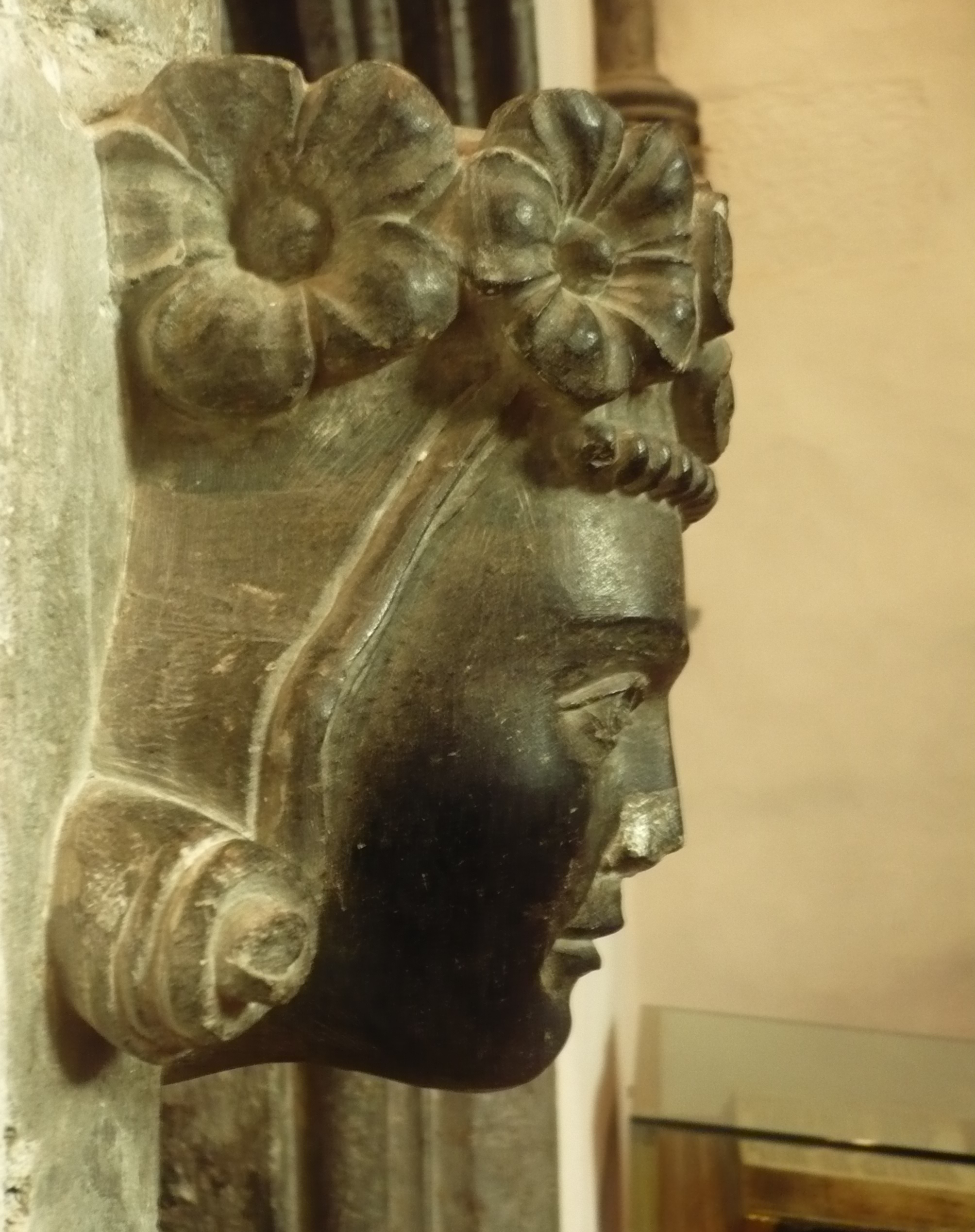
A sculpture believed to depict Haakon V as Duke of Oslo, Oppland, Ryfylke, the Faroe Islands, and Shetland.

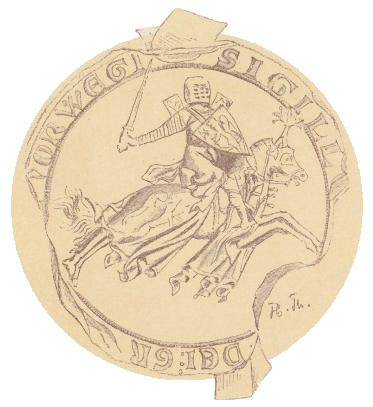
Seal of Haakon as Duke (obverse), in known use 1292–98; the Norwegian coat of arms appears on the reverse

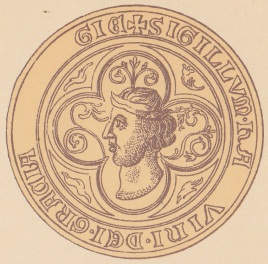
One-sided seal of Haakon as Duke, from 1298

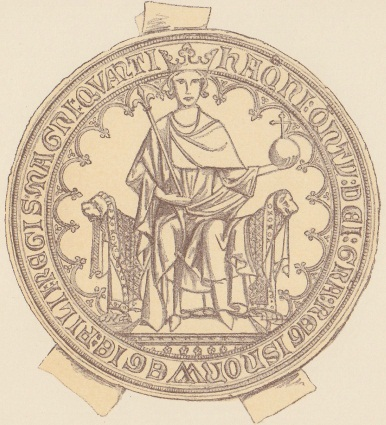
Seal of Haakon as King (obverse), in known use 1305–18; the Norwegian coat of arms appears on the reverse

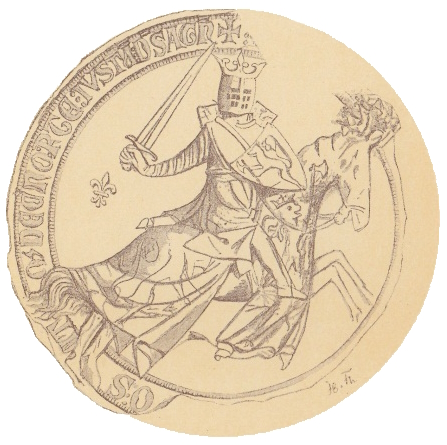
Reverse of another version of Haakon's seal as King, in known use 1300–02

== Other sources ==
- Helle, Knut (1964) Norge blir en stat, 1130–1319 (Universitetsforlaget) ISBN 82-00-01323-5
- Holmsen, Andreas (1939) Norges historie. Fra de eldste tider til 1660 (Universitetsforlaget)
- Gjerset, Knut (1915) History of the Norwegian People (MacMillan Company, Volumes I & II)

Haakon Magnusson House of Sverre Cadet branch of the House of Hardrada Born: 10 April 1270 Died: 8 May 1319
Regnal titles
Preceded by Eric II	King of Norway; 1299–1319	Succeeded by Magnus VII
