= Beate Clausdatter Bille =

Danish noblewoman

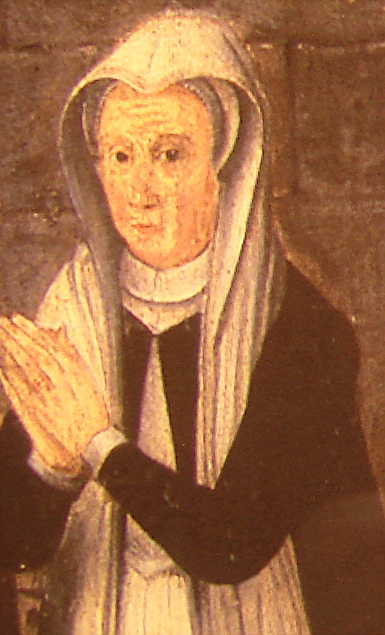
- Mural at Kågeröd Church
- Born: April 30, 1526; Skarhult Castle, Scania
- Died: October 18, 1605 (aged 79); Lundegård, Scania
- Burial place: Kågeröd Church
- Spouse: Otte Brahe (m. 1544; died 1571)
- Children: 8, including: Steen Ottesen Brahe; Tycho Brahe; Sophia Brahe
- Family: Bille family; Brahe family

Beate Clausdatter Bille (30 April 1526 – 18 October 1605) was a Danish noblewoman and vassal who was born into the noble Bille family and married into the Brahe family. As a member of the royal court, she was Chief Court Mistress to Queen Sophie from 1584 to 1592. She married statesman Otte Brahe and became a feudal fiefholder in her own right following the death of her husband.

She and her husband Otte had 12 children, 8 of whom survived into adulthood, including the influential scientists and astronomers Tycho and Sophia Brahe.

== Biography ==
Beate Clausdatter Bille was born on 30 April 1526 at Skarhult Castle into the noble Bille family. Her father, Claus Bille, was a member of the Riksråd and her mother, Elisabeth Ulfstand, came from the Ulfstand family. She had two brothers: Jens Bille and Steen Bille (1527–1586). In 1544, as the age of 18, she married Otte Brahe. At the time, it was uncommon for aristocratic women to take their husband's surnames, and so she maintained her maiden name. Otto was a member of the Brahe family and, like her father, a member of the Riksråd.

She and Otte had 12 children, 8 of whom survived into adulthood: Lisbet Brahe (1545–1563), Tycho Brahe (1546–1601), Steen Ottesen Brahe (1547–1620), Axel Brahe (1550–1616), Margaret Brahe (1551–1516), Jørgen Brahe (1554–1601), Knud Brahe (1555–1615), and Sophia Brahe (1556/1559–1643). They had two daughters who died in childhood: Maren (b. 1549) and Kirsten (1552–1566), and two stillborn children. Two of their sons, Steen and Axel, followed in their father's footsteps to become members of the Riksråd. Jørgen and Knud became vassals of various fiefs within the Kingdom of Denmark. Sophia and Tycho became influential renaissance scientists and astronomers.

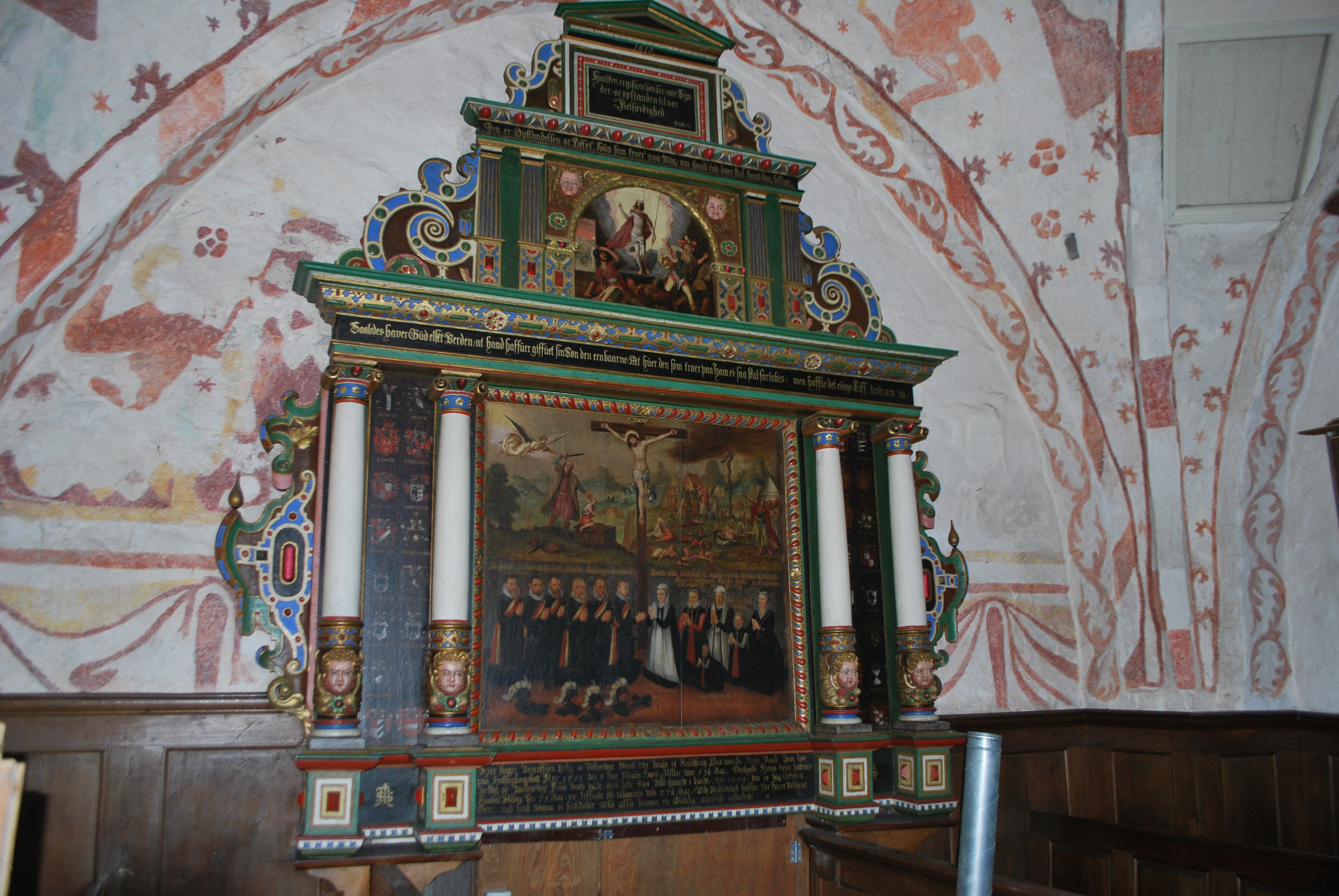
Memorial painting of Beate Clausdatter Bille, her husband, and their children in Kågeröd Church

Bille's husband held substantial fiefs on behalf of the crown. Because Denmark had no law of primogeniture, she assumed administration of four of them after his death in 1571, collecting income from the fiefs as a vassal. She administered the fiefs of Froste in Scania and Vissenbjerg Birk on Funen until 1575, and Rødinge in Scania until 1592.

In 1577, Bille was invited along with a selection of other nobles to be a godparent to Queen Sophie's son, the later Christian IV of Denmark. When her sister-in-law, Inger Oxe, resigned as Queen Sophie's Chief Court Mistress in 1584, Bille took over her role. She was the Chief Court Mistress for 8 years, until 1592. While at court, she was a noted supporter of the arts. She, perhaps on behalf of the Queen, encouraged Anders Sørensen Vedel to publish his collection of folk songs. Vedel dedicated one of his devotional books to her in 1592.

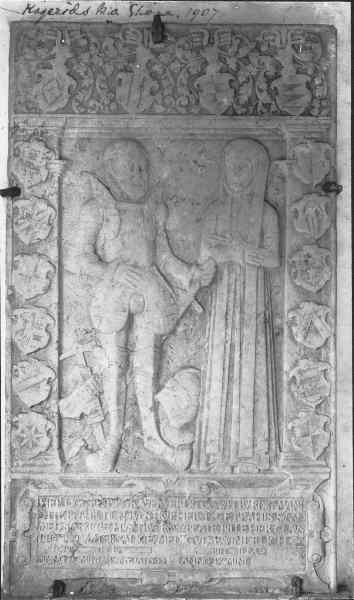
Otto Brahe and Beate Bilde's tombstone at Kågeröd Church

She died at Lundegård on 18 October 1605 and is buried with her husband in Kågeröd Church in Scania.

Court offices
Preceded by Inger Oxe	Hofmesterinde to the Queen; 1584–1592	Succeeded by Beate Huitfeldt
