= Henrich Krummedige =

Danish-Norwegian nobleman

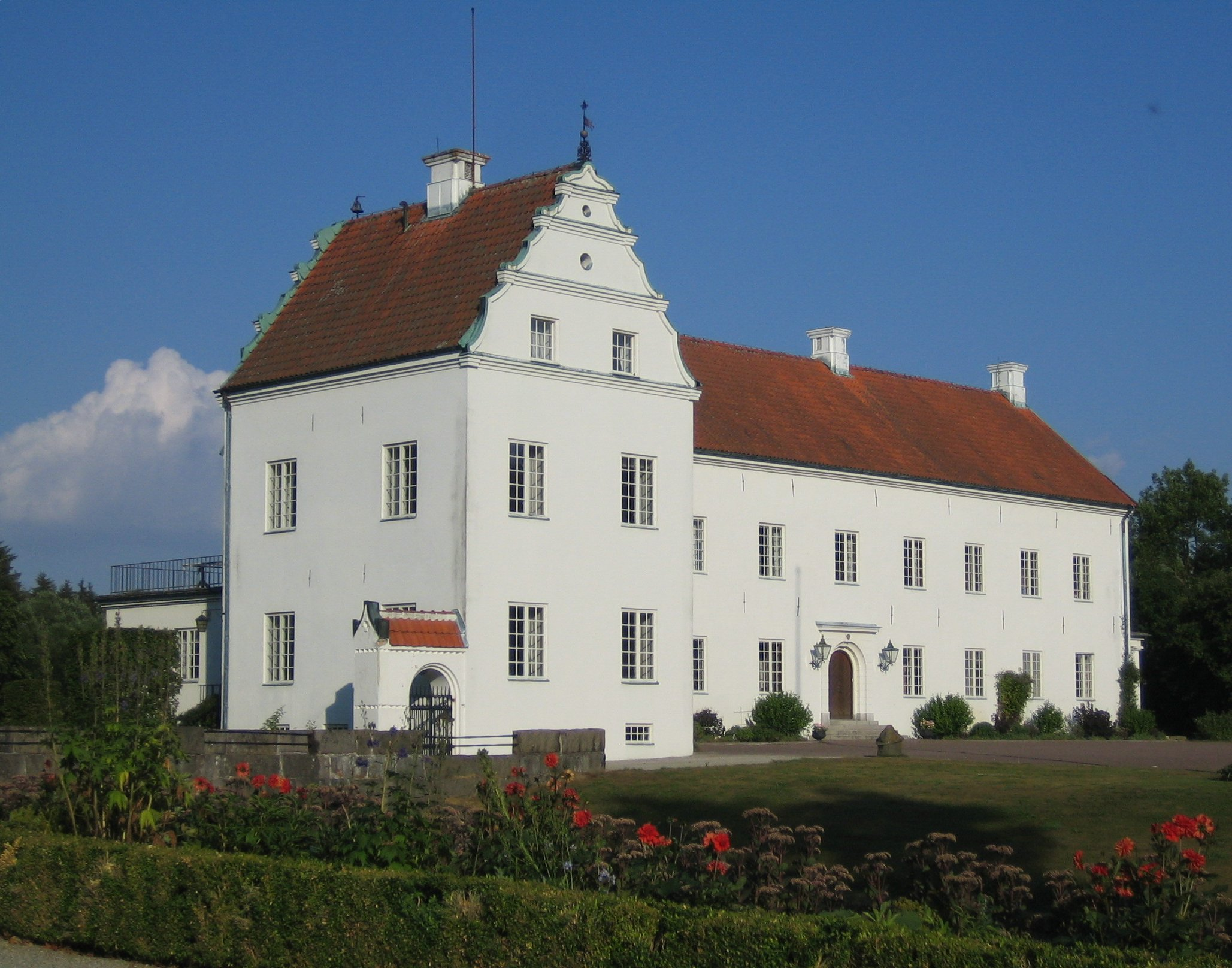
- Krummedige owned Ellinge Manor
- Born: circa 1464; Kalmar Union
- Died: 1530 (aged 65–66); Funen, Denmark-Norway
- Other names: Henrik or Hinrik Krummedike
- Occupations: Danish National Councilor, Norwegian National Councilor, Fiefholder for various fiefs
- Known for: Nobleman
- Spouse: Anne Jørgensdatter Rud
- Parent: Hartvig Krummedige

Henrich Krummedige (c. 1464 – 1530) was a Danish-Norwegian nobleman and a member of both the Norwegian and Danish National Councils (Rigsråd) and played an extensive role in the politics of the era. He served as commanding officer of the Bohus Fortress in Norway from 1489 to 1503.

== Family and youth ==
Krummedige was Hartvig Krummedige’s son by a second marriage. He is believed to have been born in Norway. In about 1493 he married Anne Jørgensdatter Rud, daughter of Danish National Councilor Jørgen Mikkelsen Rud of Vedby and Kirstine Eriksdatter Rosenkrantz. Her nephews included Otte Brahe, who was the son of her sister, Sophie Jørgensdatter Rud (1488–1555).

== Career ==
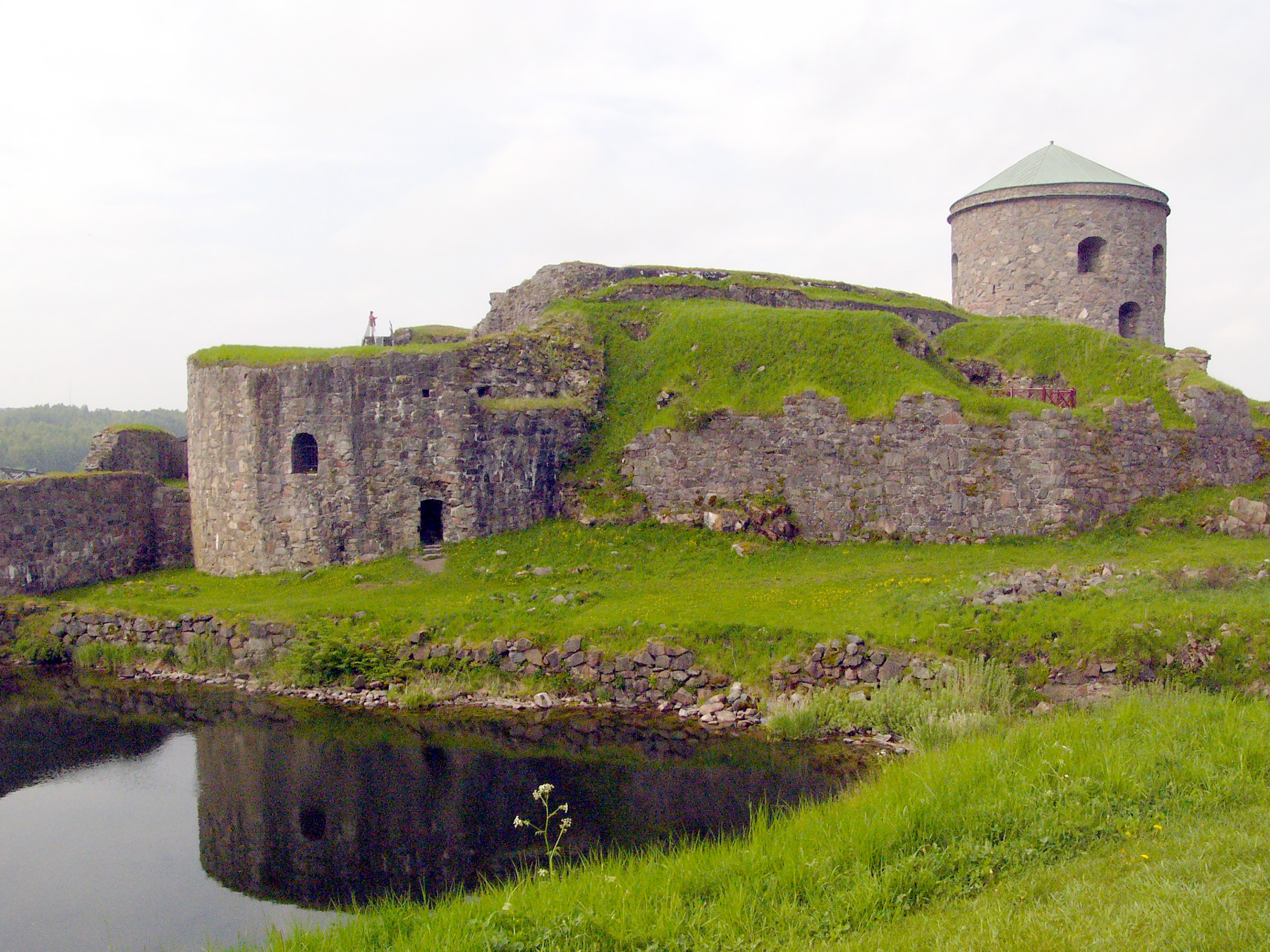
Krummedige took command of Bohus fortress in 1489

In 1484 or 85 Krummedige was knighted and entered service in 1487 at Akershus Fortress. In 1489 he was placed in charge of the strategically important Norwegian border defense, Båhus Fortress. At the same time he was elevated to serve as a member of the Norwegian National Council (Rigsraad).

=== The Krummedige-Tre Rosor rivalry ===
==== The origin of the rivalry ====
Upon the 1448 death of King Christopher of Bavaria, who was union king of Denmark (1440–1448), Sweden (1441–1448) and Norway (1442–1448), the Norwegian succession resulted in controversy. In Norway the new king had to be elected by the Norwegian National Council. There were effectively two parties in the Norwegian National Council: The pro-Danish party led by Hartvig Krummedige (then the commandant at Akershus) and Bishop Jens of Oslo, and the pro-Swedish party led by the Archbishop Alsak Bolt and Erik Saemundsson, then the commandant at Tønsberg Fortress.

The pro-Danish party prevailed and Christian I of Denmark was elected king, although not without subsequent strife. Karl Knutsson invaded from Sweden and proceeded to Hamar, where he called a Thing, and was “elected king” by Archbishop Bolt, Erik Saemundsson and others who assembled there. King Karl proceeded to Trøndelag. He then returned to Sweden, leaving Saemundsson as viceroy. Saemundsson invested Akershus, which was held by Krummedige, who still adhered to Christian I. Ultimately Saemundsson was killed by Krummedige, the leading pro-Swedish advocates fled to Sweden, and Karl Knutsson renounced his claim to the throne.

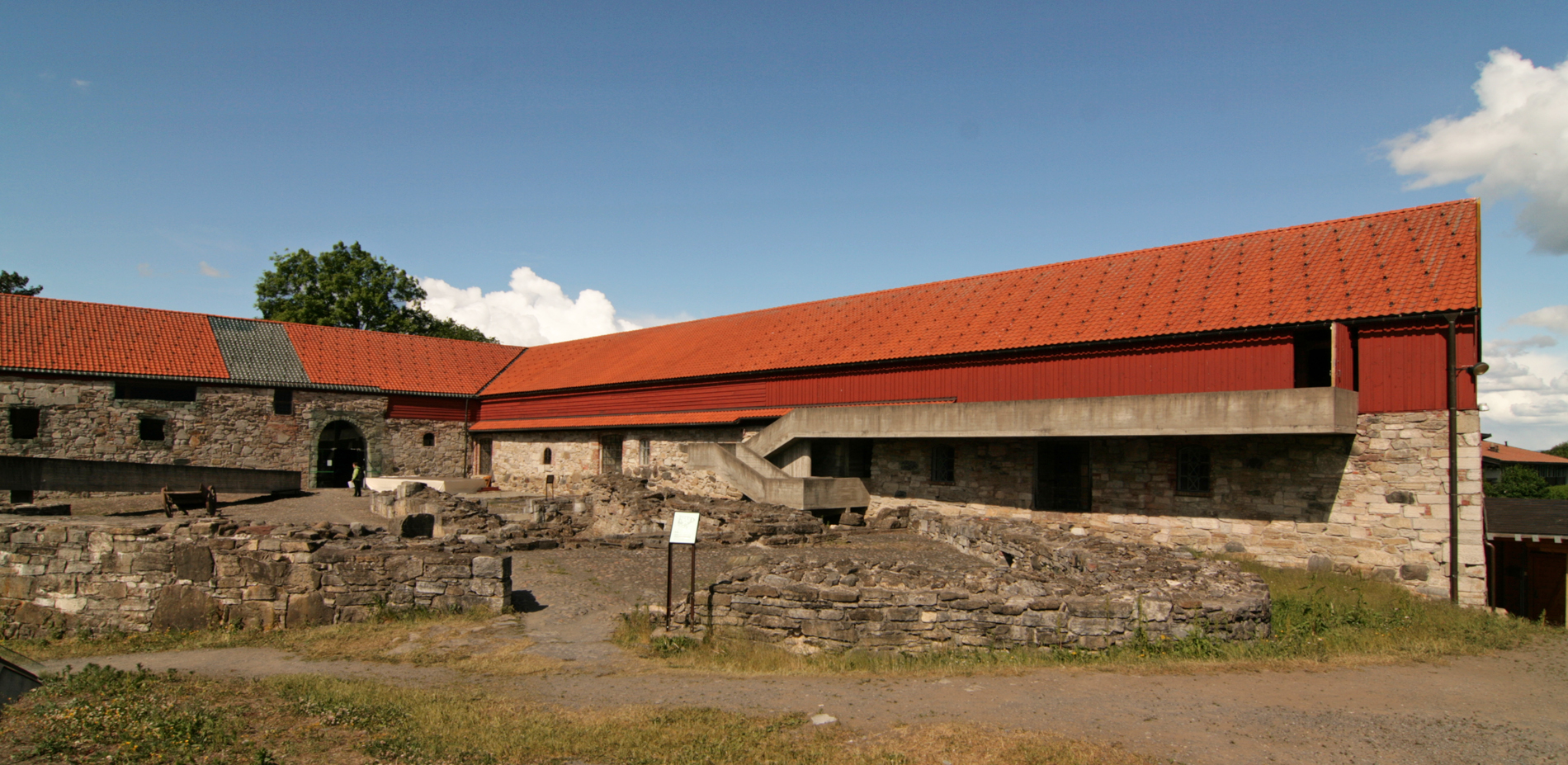
Ruins of medieval Hamar Bishop's palace.

Swedish forces again invaded Trøndelag in 1453, but were repelled and were forced to turn south across the Dovrefjell and to Hamar, where they captured and occupied Hamarhus, the Bishop's palace. Hartvig Krummedige proceeded north, expelled the Swedish forces, and killed many of them. With this act, as well as his previous involvement in the death of Saemundsson, he earned the enmity of pro-Swedish Alv Knutsson; Saemundsson and Knutsson were members of the Tre Rosor family, which title comes from their coat of arms, which includes three roses. Alv Knutsson had extensive holdings, over 276 farms in east and south Norway, and could bring substantial pressure to bear. He arranged that charges be brought against Hartvig Krummedige by one of the local farmers – as a result Hartvig Krummedige lost all of his fiefs. Knutsson also worked through the Pope to obtain a papal bull concerning Krummedige's misuse of power. In spite of this dramatic setback, Christian I of Denmark restored Krummedige to Akershus by 1461. Hartvig Krummedige died in 1476, but his son Henrich remained a firm member of the pro-Danish party; the rivalry with the Tre Rosor family virtually guaranteed this would be so.

==== The rivalry in Knut Alvsonn's time ====
When Henrich was elevated to similar positions in Norway as his father had held, he also inherited the family conflict with the influential and wealthy Swedish Tre Rosor noble family. Pro-Swedish Alv Knutsson's son, Knut Alvsonn, of the family Tre Rosor was Lord of Giske, and Sigurd Jonsson’s ultimate heir. Sigurd, the son of the Swedish nobleman Jon Marteinsson, was a Norwegian nobleman and knight, and the supreme leader of Norway during two interregnums in the mid-15th century. After the death of King Christopher in 1448 Sigurd Jonsson was offered the vacant throne of Norway, but declined to pursue a claim. Alv was a Royal Councilor of Norway, and holder of vast landed properties around Norway, having inherited land as well as a claim to the throne of Norway from his Giske-Bjarkøy-Sudreim ancestors. Knut Alvson was personal enemy of Lord Henrich Krummedige and a member of the pro-Swedish faction on the Norwegian National Council. Knut took over Akershus in 1497.

Knut Alvsonn soon came into conflict with Norwegian peasants who killed his bailiffs and otherwise resisted him, until he petitioned Henrik Krummedige for support, since Krummedige had demonstrated his ability to work constructively with the local land owners. Kummerdige not only failed to support, but informed the King of the matter. Knut Alvsonn was relieved of his command of Akershus Fortress by Peder Griis, a Danish nobleman loyal to the king.

In 1500 King Hans of Denmark, Sweden and Norway made an ill-fated attempt to conquer the Ditmarshes (Dithmarschen) in Northern Germany. Knut Alvsson, who had married the granddaughter of Karl Knutsson, and was involved with the Swedish Independence Party, concluded it was time to act. Parallel to a new Dano-Swedish War, his rebellion began in 1501 in Sweden, but soon came to Båhus Fortress on the Swedish-Norwegian border, which Henrich Krummedige commanded. Krummedige held his fief at Båhus, but Alvsson captured Akershus Fortress in March 1502, although the citizens of Oslo remained pro-Danish while the nobles and bishops of the country remained neutral—presumably waiting to see which side prevailed.

King Hans dispatched his son Christian (later crowned King Christian II of Denmark) at the head of forces; they relieved the siege of Båhus Fortress, captured and reduced Älvsborg Fortress across the river from Båhus Fortress in Gothenburg. Krummedige then led forces north to finish off the rebellion by recapturing Tønsberg Fortress and laid siege to Akershus Fortress, which Alvsson was defending.

When it became clear that the rebellion had failed, Alvsson came on board one of Krummedige's ships under a safe conduct. Krummedige killed Alvsson either by treachery or, as alleged by Krummedige, in response to Alvsson's own violence. Alvsson was judged a traitor and Alvsson's property was forfeit to the crown. Krummedige had prevailed, although Gjerset reports he was compelled to leave Norway and the uprising was not totally quelled until 1504 .

The death of Alvsson was used to set an anti-Danish tone in Ibsen's play Fru Inger til Østeraad, when he has Olaf Skaktavl acclaim: "Recall the afternoon when Hendrik Krummedike came before Akershus fortress with his fleet? The captains of the fleet offered to discuss peace terms; and, trusting a safe conduct, Knut Alfsøn went onboard. Only three hours later we had to carry him through the fortress gate [...] Norway's bravest heart was lost when Krummedike's minions struck him down..."

==== The rivalry in Karl Knutson's time ====
Knut Alvsson had two sons, Karl Knutsson and Erik Knutsson. Karl Knutsson continued the multigenerational inter-family quarrel. Karl found favor with Christian II and used the opportunity to slander Krummeridge. On the basis of minor irregularities Christian II removed Krummedige of the command of Varberg Fortress as well as of all his Norwegian fiefdoms. As a result of this Krummeridge transferred his support to Frederick I and worked for his election as the king of Norway.

=== The conflict with Vincens Lunge ===
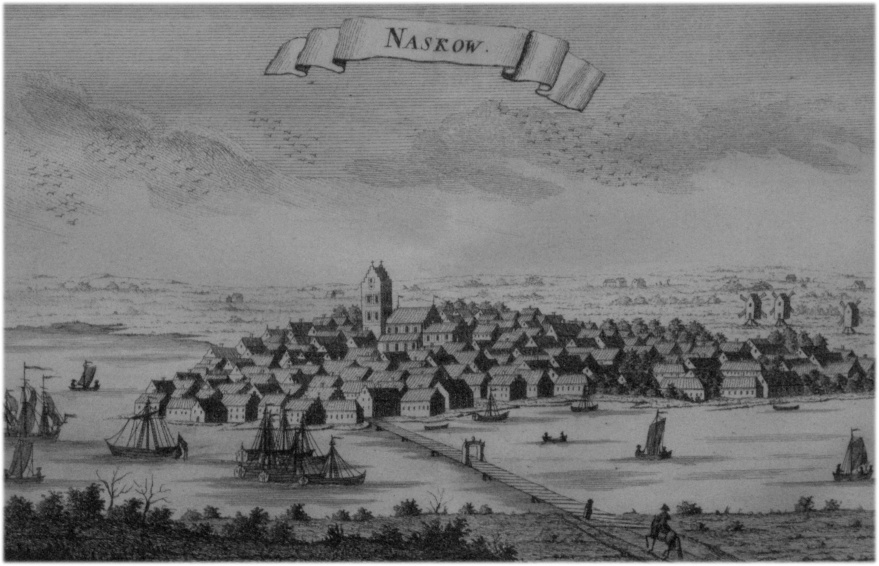
Nakskov, site of the Lübeck attack

Danish-born nobleman Vincens Lunge married the daughter of Chancellor and Lord High Steward of Norway Niels Henriksson ("Gyldenløve") (c. 1458–1523) and his wife, the famous Ingerd Ottesdatter. He was one of several notable Danes who acquired land, resided permanently in Norway, became nominally thoroughly Norwegian and founded new Norwegian noble families, which replaced the old nobility of the first rank.

Henrich Krummedige and Vincens Lunge appeared to have much in common: both were Danish-born nobles, both supported the Lutheran Reformation, both supported Frederick I of Denmark, both were members of the Norwegian National Council and both held extensive estates and other properties in Norway. They held another thing in common: ambition.

At the 1524 meeting of the Norwegian National Council—the first meeting which Vincens Lunge attended and one at which Henrich Krummedige was not present—Roman Catholic Archbishop of Nidaros Olav Engelbrektsson and Vincens Lunge cooperated to force the newly elected Frederick I to accept a charter with terms designed to maintain Norway's independence, including:

- the king was not to impose taxes without the council's consent,
- the king was not to infringe on the Catholic Church's rights in Norway, and
- the king was to rule Norway only through native-born or married-in Norwegians who resided in Norway.

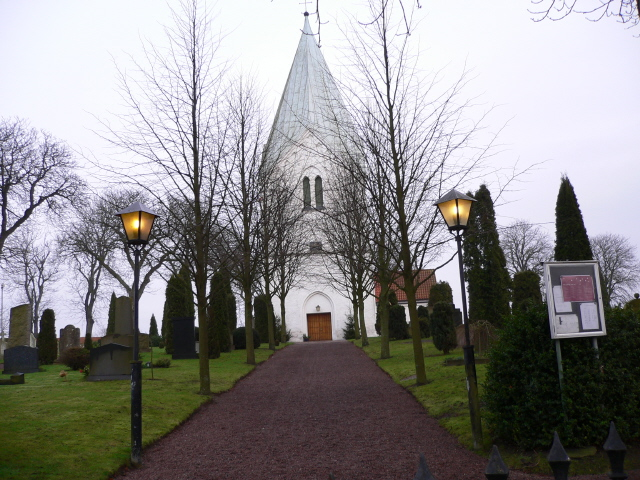
Västra Ingelstad Church, where Henrich Krummedige lies buried.

The short-term effect of this charter was to enable Lunge, who had married into the noble Norwegian Rømer family, to remain in place while Henrich Krummedige lost his fiefs and was de facto expelled from the Norwegian National Council. King Frederick I was clearly pragmatic in achieving what he wanted, and never came to Norway to be crowned. He honored the charter only when it was convenient. The Catholic Church was undercut, taxes were increased, Danes continued to be placed in critical positions (particularly as commanders of major fortresses), and Henrich Krummedige regained his position on the Norwegian National Council in 1528.

=== The Månstorp dispute sets up opposition to King Christian II ===
Although both Henrik and his father had a long history of strong support for the Danish Kings, the Månstorp dispute placed Henrik in a new role as the king's opponents.

=== Economic accomplishments ===
Krummedige was not only a nobleman with political skills and the tough minded approach to accomplish difficult deeds; he was also an able investor, interested in commerce and industry.

Krummedige inherited extensive land holdings, both in Norway (Brunlag) and in Denmark, which he increased further through purchase and legal process. As a result, he was probably the largest Danish-Norwegian landholder of his period. In addition to inheriting approximately 240 farms he invested the revenues from his Norwegian fiefdoms and purchased an additional 178 farms in Norway with most concentrated in Båhuslen. In Denmark he increased his holdings by 300 tenant farms and four manors.

Krummedige understood the value of maximizing the profit from his produce by selling it for the best price and participated actively in commercial trade – owning houses and commercial facilities in Bergen, Oslo, and Tønsberg in Norway as well as Roskilde, the Gothenburg area (Nya Lödöse), Halmstad, Malmø, and Copenhagen in Denmark. He also participated in foreign trade with his own vessels.

His interests were not limited to agriculture and commerce. He may have run the earliest known copper mining venture in Norway, which was located at Sandsvær. The mine is mentioned in a 1490 letter from King Hans to Henrik Krummedike, and is the first written source that directly deals with a copper mine in Norway, mentioning "our copper plant in Sandsvær." Although Krummedike and Pålsson were granted the mining rights, there are no sources confirming the mine was cost effective. He was among the first who used water-driven saws for the production of large quantities of lumber in Norway and may have introduced them. He also constructed a large brick kiln capable of producing over 18,000 bricks at a firing on his estate in Månstorp.

== Final years ==
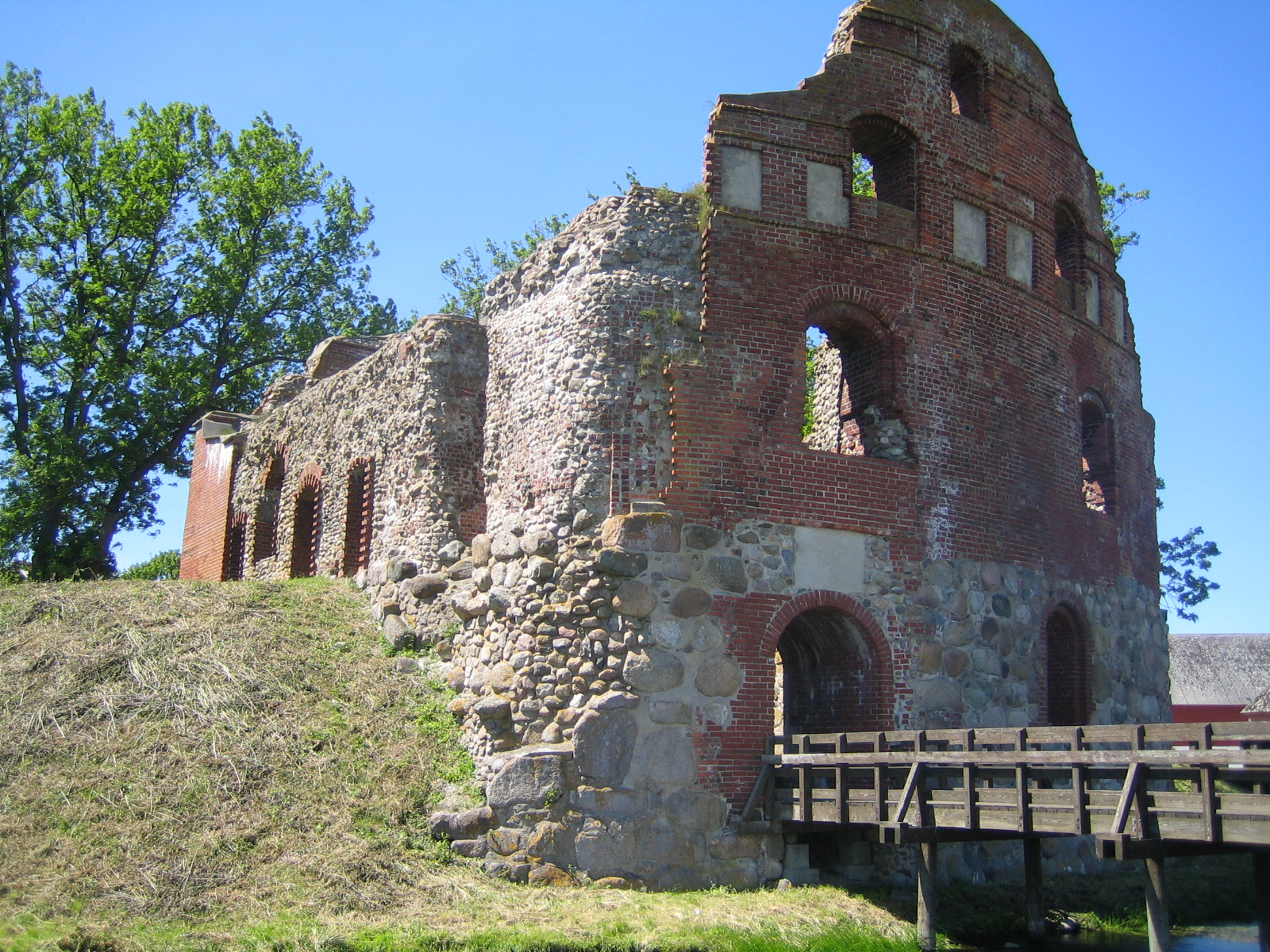
Henrich Krummedige died at Månstorps Gables

Krummedige died at Månstorps Gables in 1530 and is buried in Västra Ingelstad Church. His wife survived him by three years. With the death of his nephew, the male line of the Krummedige dynasty died out.
