= Knutstorp =

Knutstorp may refer to:

- Knutstorp Castle, a castle in southern Sweden
- Ring Knutstorp, a motor racing circuit in Sweden
