= Västra Ingelstad Church =

Coordinates: 55°29′25″N 13°07′01″E

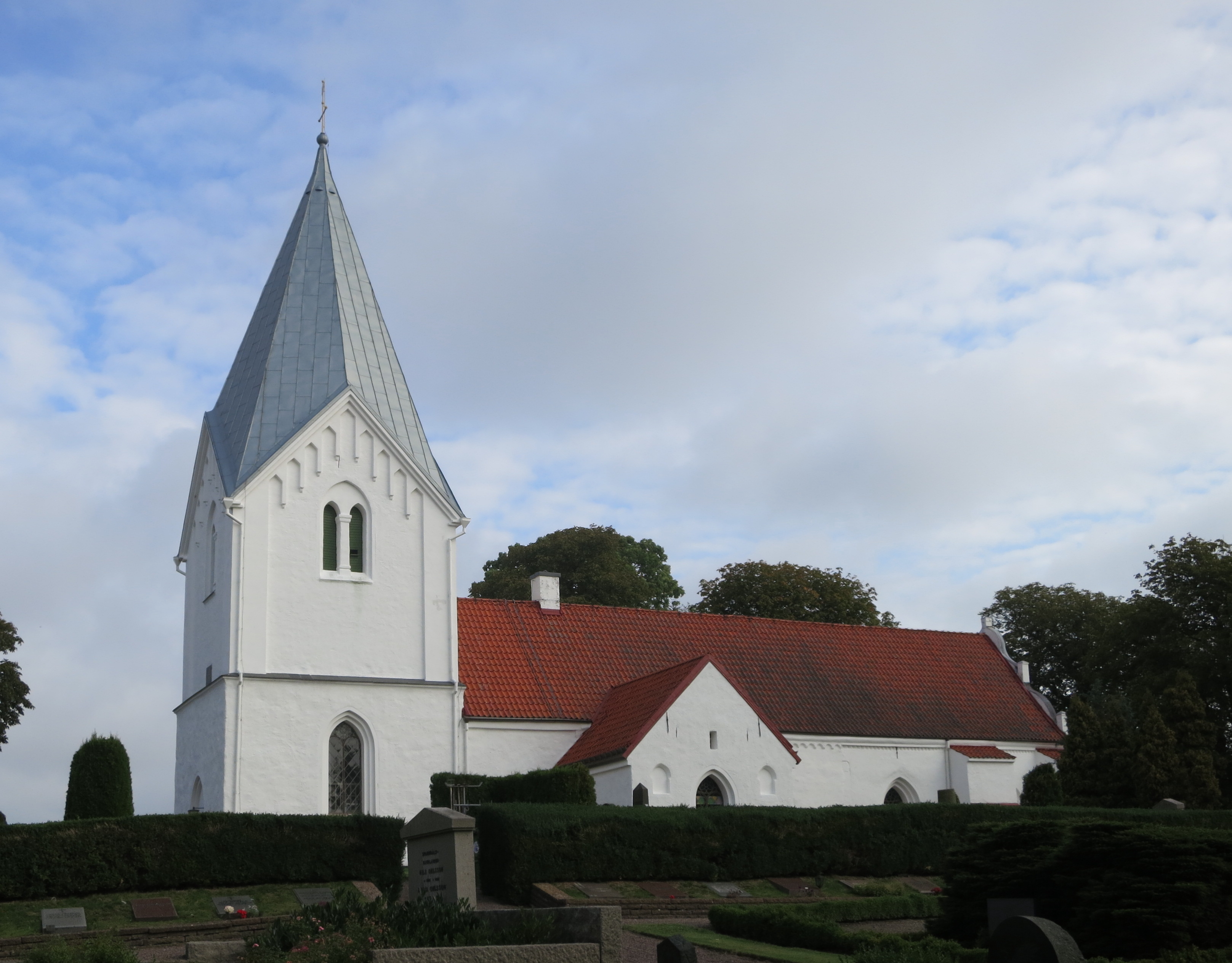
Västra Ingelstad Church, view of the exterior

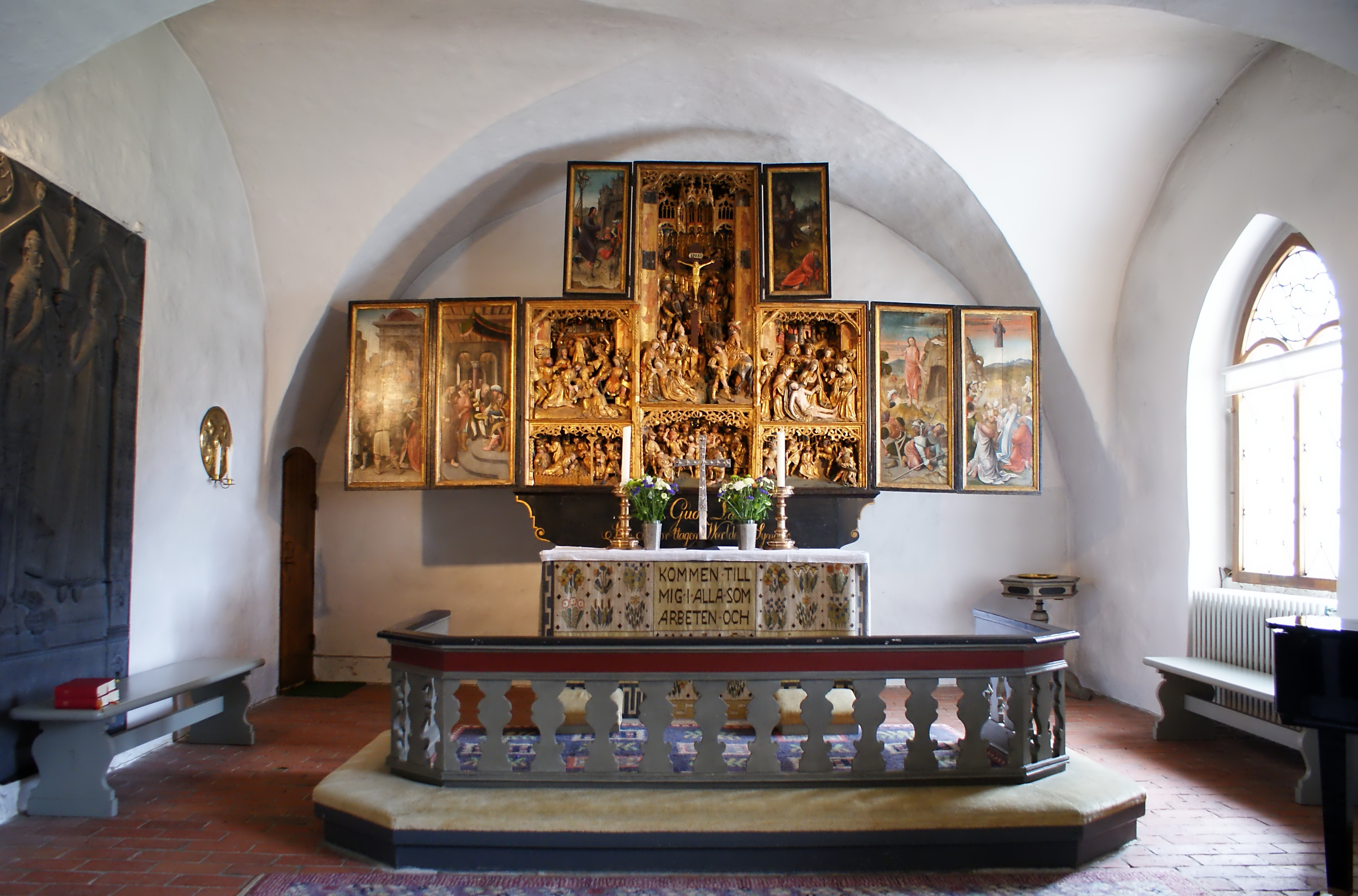
Interior view of the choir with the altarpiece

Västra Ingelstad Church (Swedish: Västra Ingelstads kyrka) is a medieval church in Västra Ingelstad, in the province of Skåne, Sweden. It is the burial place of Danish-Norwegian statesman Henrich Krummedige and contains a richly decorated altarpiece from Antwerp, unparalleled in the province of Skåne.

== History ==
The first church to be built where the presently visible church stands was probably a stave church. During the 12th century, it was replaced by the presently visible stone church. The church has been successively enlarged and rebuilt since then, and today only a single Romanesque window and parts of the northern wall of the nave remain from the earliest church. The church porch in front of the southern entrance was built during the 14th century, and the interior vaults date from 1450-1475. In the 1520s the church was enlarged towards the west. At the same time a burial chamber was installed for the Krummedige family, owner of nearby Månstorp Gables. The Danish-Norwegian statesman Henrich Krummedige is buried in the burial chamber. The Renaissance gable adorning the western facade of the church was constructed in 1593. The western entrance was made considerably later, in 1832, and the church tower added as late as 1855 and renovated already in 1894.

== Furnishings ==
The church contains a large and richly decorated altarpiece made in Antwerp c. 1520. There are no other similar pieces in the province of Skåne. The central part consists of deep sections with an abundance of sculpted scenes, depicting the suffering of Christ. The six wings have painted depictions of the Passion and six saints. It has been suggested that such a valuable altarpiece perhaps originally was made for a richer church in nearby Malmö, possibly Sankt Petri, but it is also possible that the altarpiece was made for Västra Ingelstad Church and installed in the church during the reconstruction of the church in the 1520s.

The other furnishings of the church are from after the Reformation. The pulpit was made in the 1620s and altered in 1742. The pews are from the 18th century, and the baptismal font was made in 1967.
