= December 1573 lunar eclipse =

Total lunar eclipse December 8, 1573

- Total eclipse
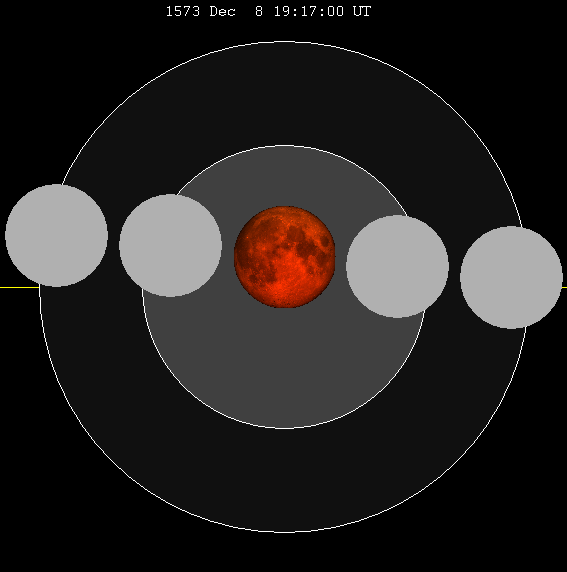
- Date: December 8, 1573
- Gamma: 0.1620
- Magnitude: 1.5597
- Saros cycle: 118 (27 of 73)
- Totality: 93 minutes, 31 seconds
- Partiality: 213 minutes, 17 seconds
- Penumbral: 330 minutes, 53 seconds
Contacts (UTC)
- P1: 16:28:39
- U1: 17:27:24
- U2: 18:27:17
- Greatest: 19:14:03
- U3: 20:00:48
- U4: 21:00:40
- P4: 21:59:32

A total lunar eclipse occurred at the Moon's ascending node of orbit on Tuesday, December 8, 1573, with an umbral magnitude of 1.5597. A lunar eclipse occurs when the Moon moves into the Earth's shadow, causing the Moon to be darkened. A total lunar eclipse occurs when the Moon's near side entirely passes into the Earth's umbral shadow. Unlike a total solar eclipse, which can only be viewed from a relatively small area of the world, a lunar eclipse may be viewed from anywhere on the night side of Earth. A total lunar eclipse can last up to nearly two hours, while a total solar eclipse lasts only a few minutes at any given place, because the Moon's shadow is smaller. Occurring about 2.4 days after perigee, the Moon's apparent diameter was larger than average.

== Visibility ==
The eclipse was visible across all of Africa, Europe, and Asia and most of Australia.

Eclipse visibility diagrams

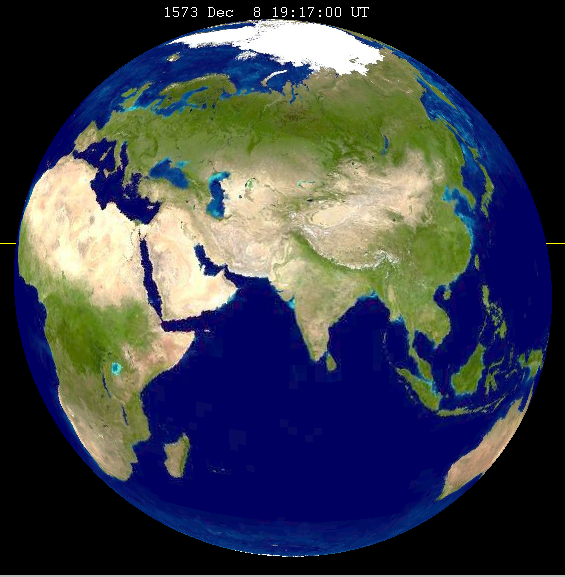
Simulated view of Earth from the Moon during the eclipse

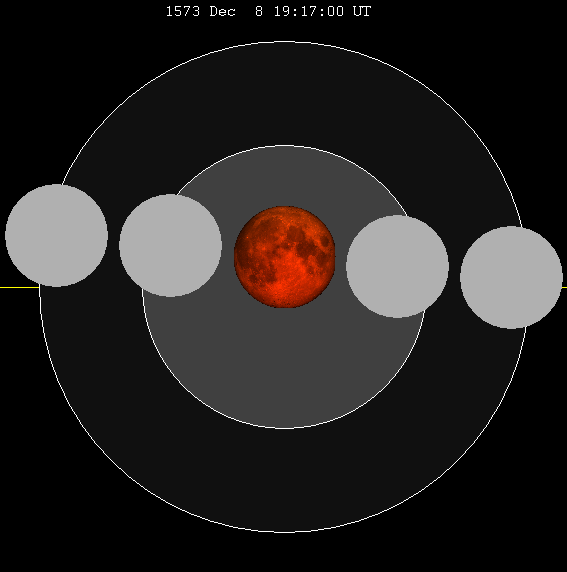
The Moon passed west to east through the center of the Earth's umbral shadow, causing a very dark red eclipse

== Observations ==
Tycho Brahe , alongside his sister, Sophia predicted the eclipse and viewed it from their family's Knutstorp Castle. Brahe said, "I cannot but be very surprised that even at this youthful age of 26 years, I was able to get such accurate results." During the eclipse, the Moon was in the constellation Gemini.

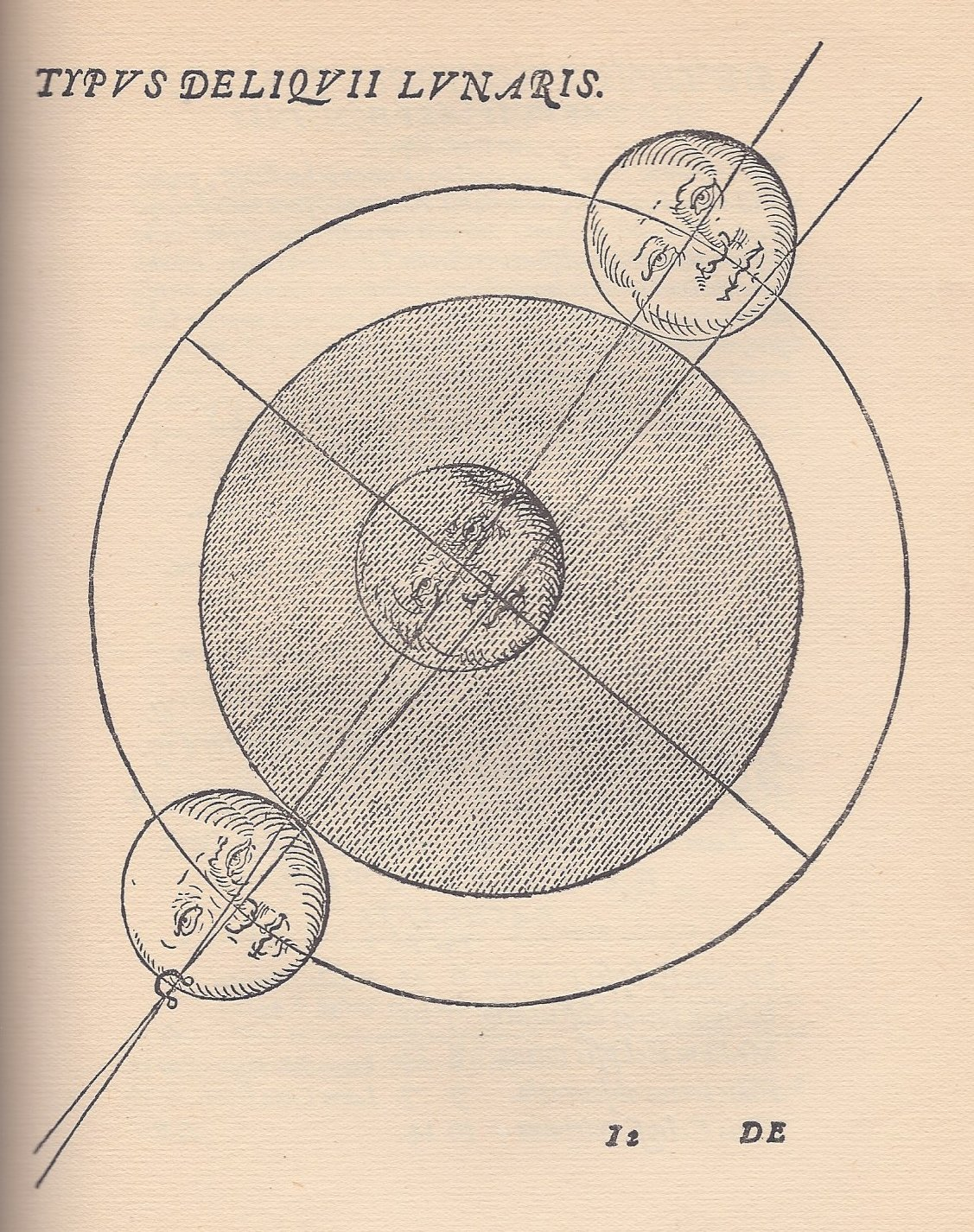
Diagram of the appearance of the eclipse from Tycho Brahe's De nova stella

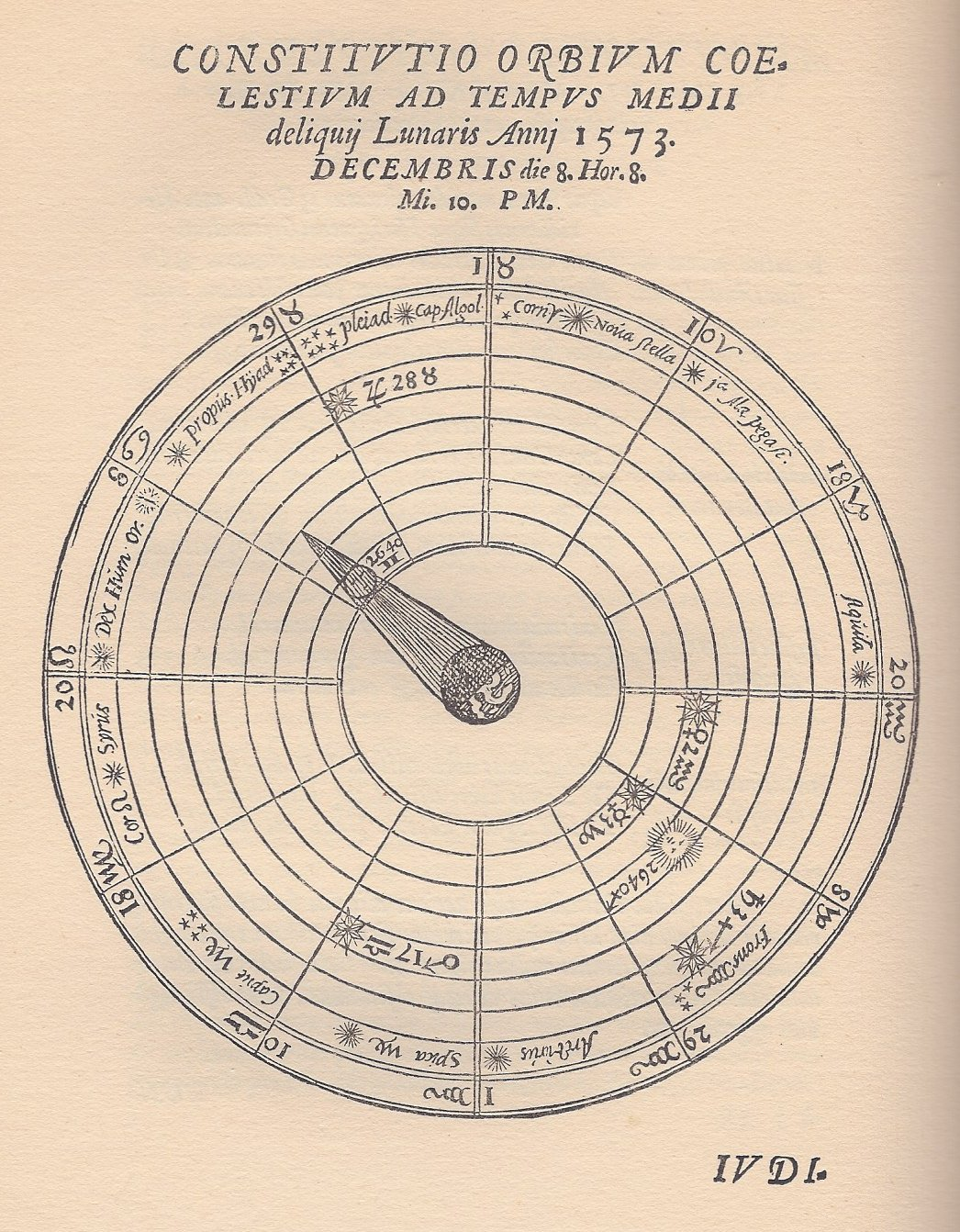
Diagram of the Solar System at the time of the eclipse from Tycho Brahe's De nova stella

== Eclipse details ==
Shown below is a table displaying details about this particular lunar eclipse. It describes various parameters pertaining to this eclipse.

December 8, 1573 Lunar Eclipse Parameters
| Parameter | Value |
|---|---|
| Penumbral Magnitude | 2.56170 |
| Umbral Magnitude | 1.55966 |
| Gamma | 0.16203 |
| Sun Right Ascension | 17h46m12.8s |
| Sun Declination | -23°27'24.2" |
| Sun Semi-Diameter | 16'16.0" |
| Sun Equatorial Horizontal Parallax | 08.9" |
| Moon Right Ascension | 05h46m07.6s |
| Moon Declination | +23°36'58.9" |
| Moon Semi-Diameter | 16'14.0" |
| Moon Equatorial Horizontal Parallax | 0°59'34.6" |
| ΔT | 132.3 s |

== See also ==
- List of 16th-century lunar eclipses
