= Claus Bille =

Danish statesman

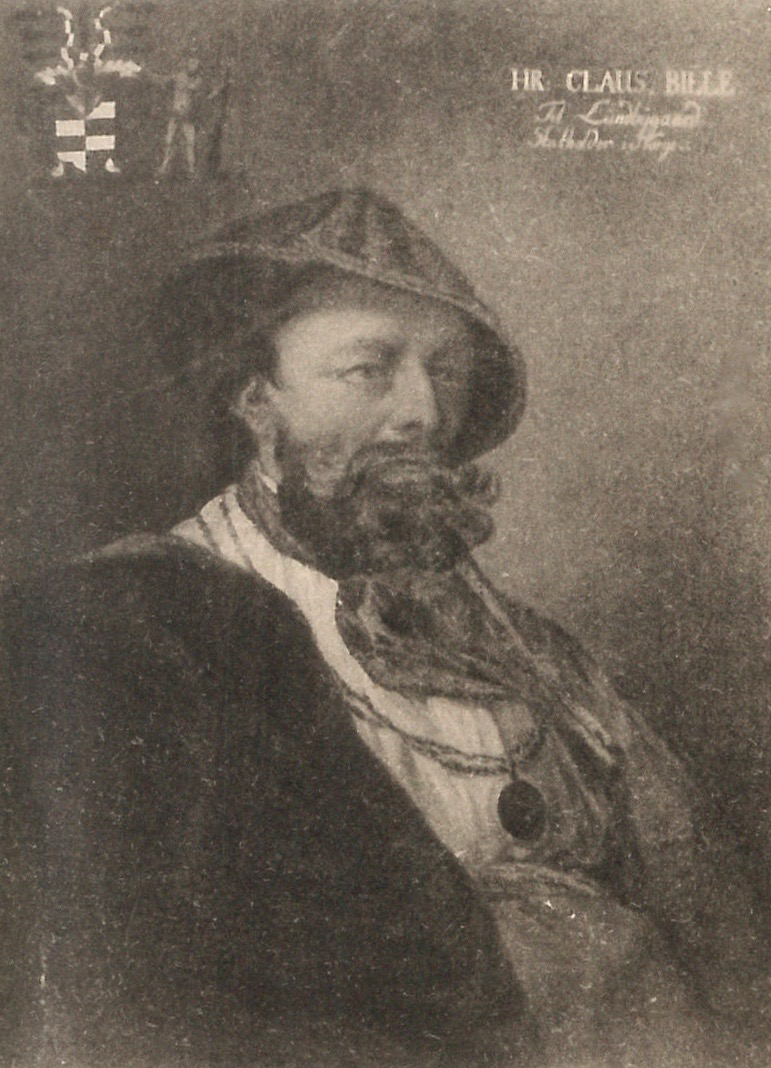
Claus Bille

Claus Bille (ca. 1490 – 4 January 1558 at Lyngsgård, Scania) was a Danish landlord and statesman.

== Early life ==
Claus was born in Allindemagle as the youngest son of a Danish nobleman, Steen Basse Torbensen Bille of Søholm (1446–1520) and his wife, Margrethe Rønnow (1450–1490).

== Biography ==
He was a major estate owner, knight (the highest rank of Danish nobility), fief lord of Båhus Castle and a member of both the Norwegian and the Danish Councils of the Realm. He was an important participant in the Stockholm Bloodbath, when he together with Søren Norby arrested the Swedish nobility. He was a first cousin of Eske Bille, and the Bille family became the most politically powerful noble family of Denmark during his lifetime.

== Personal life ==
Claus was married to Elisabeth Ulfstand (1502–1540), daughter of Knight and Admiral Jens Holgersen Ulfstand (1450–1523) and his first wife, Margrethe Arvidsdatter Trolle (1475–1523). Bille was the father of Beate Clausdatter Bille and thus the maternal grandfather of the astronomer Tycho Brahe. Direct notable descendants include British actress Judi Dench and French and Danish lawyer Steen Andersen Oluf Bille (b. 1964).
