= Jørgen Thygesen Brahe =

Danish noble (1515–1565)

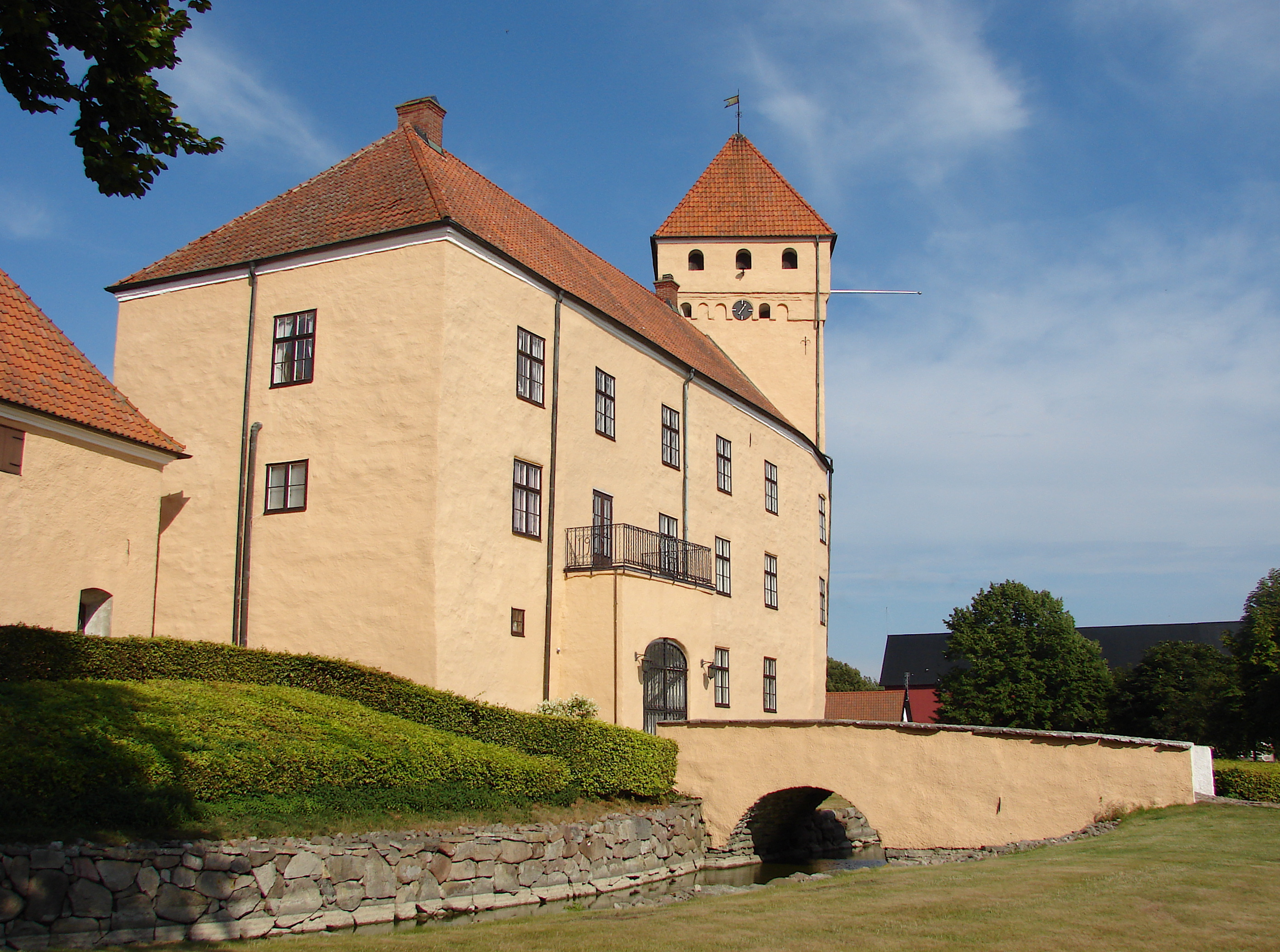
Tosterup Castle

Jørgen Thygesen Brahe (Jørgen Brahe til Tostrup i Skåne) (1515 – 21 June 1565) was a member of the Danish nobility.

== Biography ==
He was the son of Danish Councillor Thyge Axelsen Brahe til Tostrup (d. 1523) and brother of privy council (Rigsraad) member Otte Brahe (1518–1571). He was married to Inger Johansdatter Oxe, sister of Peder Oxe (1520–1575), Steward of the Realm. His marriage was childless. He and his wife adopted his nephew, astronomer Tycho Brahe (1546–1601), when Tycho was two. He raised Tycho and provided him with an education.

Jørgen inherited considerable wealth from his parents, which in terms of the social structure of the time made him eligible for a royal appointment as county sheriff. He was successively sheriff to Tranekjær (1542–49), Odensegaard (1549–52), Vordingborg Castle (1552–57), and finally (1555 until his death in 1565) to Queen Dorothea at Nykøbing Castle on Falster. By inheritance and purchase, he acquired substantial properties located principally in Skåne, Lolland and Fyn. His principal residence was at Tosterup Castle (Tosterups slott) in Scania.

During the Northern Seven Years' War, he distinguished himself in naval warfare. He was captured at the Battle of Öland (Slaget ved Øland) in 1564 in association with sinking of Makalös, the largest warship of the Baltic Sea . He later distinguished himself at the Battle of Rügen in June 1565. He died that same year from a disease he had contracted while rescuing King Frederick II of Denmark when his horse was thrown into the water at Højbro, the bridge leading over to Slotsholmen.
