= Otte Brahe =

Danish noble (1518–1571)

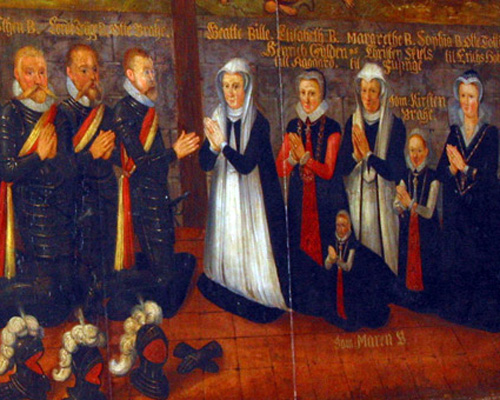
- The Brahe family
- Born: 2 October 1518; Tosterup, Denmark, Kalmar Union
- Died: 9 May 1571 (aged 52); Denmark, Denmark–Norway
- Spouse: Beate Clausdatter Bille (m. 1544)
- Children: 12; including Tycho and Sophia
- Parents: Tyge Brahe (father); Sophie Rud (mother)
- Relatives: Jørgen Thygesen Brahe (older brother); Anne Rud (maternal aunt)
- Family: Brahe

Otte Brahe (Danish: [ˈotsʰə ˈpʁɑːə]; 2 October 1518 – 9 May 1571) was a Danish (Scanian) nobleman and statesman, who served on the privy council (Rigsraad, "Council of the Realm"). He was married to Beate Clausdatter Bille and was the father of astronomers Tycho and Sophia Brahe.

== Life ==
=== Family life ===
Brahe was born in Tosterup to Tyge Brahe and Sophie Rud. He was nephew of Anne Rud and Henrich Krummedige. Brahe married Beate Clausdatter Bille in 1544. Both the Brahes and the Billes were among the most powerful noble families in Denmark during their lives. Both families owned farms, forests, and land as well as noble houses in several Danish cities including Copenhagen. They built a brick castle at Knudstrup completed in 1550. Their first child was a daughter, Lizbeth. This was followed by twin boys on 14 December 1546. However, one of the twins died before being baptized and named. The other was named Tyge (after Brahe's father).

It is for their son Tyge that Brahe is best known as he became a famous astronomer and took on the name Tycho Brahe as a teenager. Strangely, their son Tyge was kidnapped by Brahe's older brother, Jørgen, in 1548. Tycho later wrote: "without the knowledge of my parents [Jørgen took] me away with him while I was in my earliest youth. He supported me generously during his lifetime." While Jørgen took Tyge without their permission, it does not appear that Brahe and his wife strove to have him returned.

Together, they had twelve children, eight of whom survived childhood including a daughter Sophia Brahe. Brahe was not enthusiastic about any of his five sons learning Latin, the language of education at the time, considering it a waste of time. Instead, he arranged for them to become military leaders, brought up in courtly way, to horsemanship, and in sword fighting.

=== Political life ===
The Brahe family was powerful. At one point, in a bid to expand his estate at Knudstrup, he burned the crops of seven farmers and chased them into the forest. Brahe was a close ally of the Danish king. Later in Brahe's life he became governor of Helsingborg castle (probably due to the influence of Peder Oxe). From 1563 he was a member of the Rigsraad oligarchy (about 20 members) that ruled Denmark.

=== Death ===
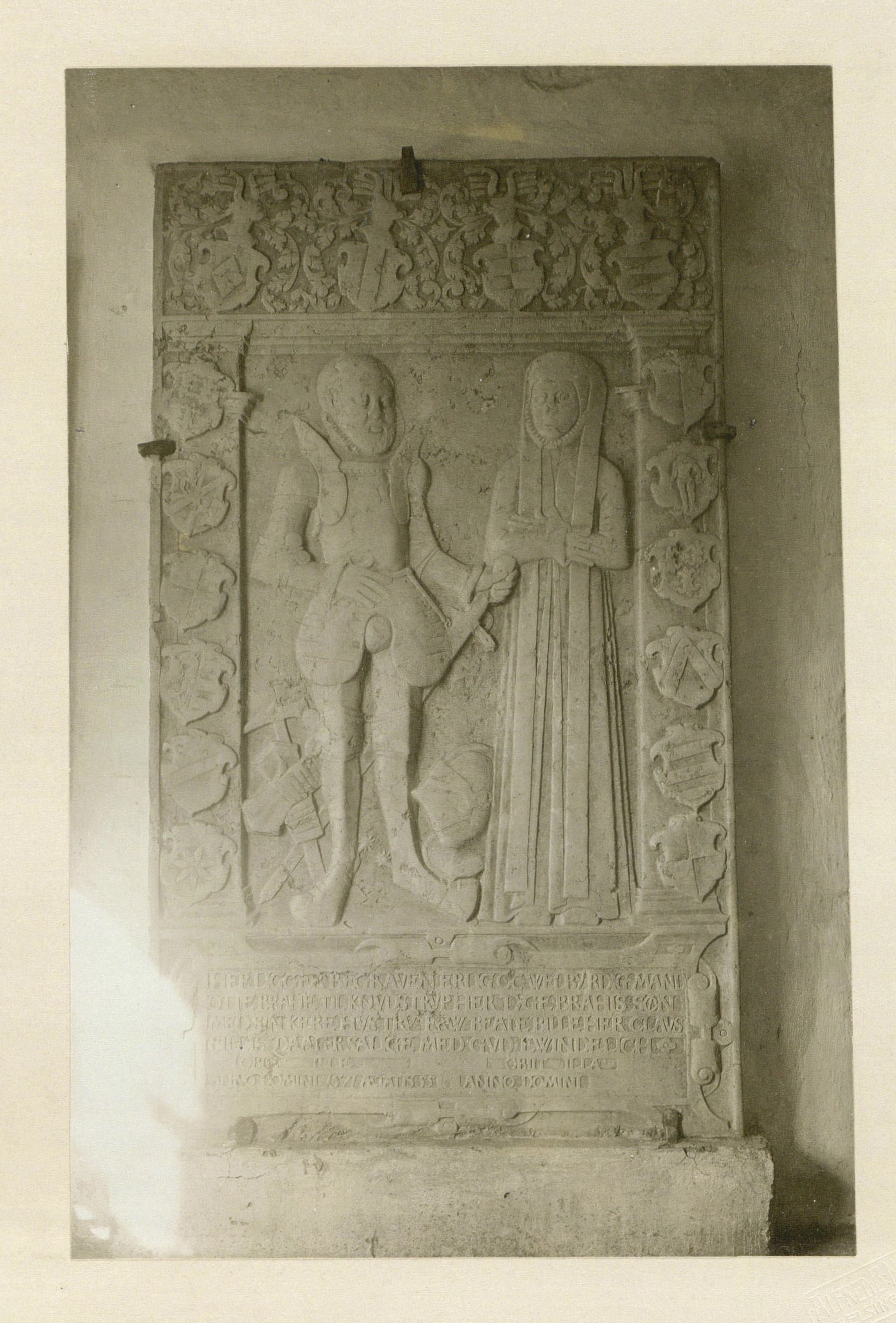
Otte Brahe's ledgerstone.

Brahe fell very ill in Denmark in late 1570, and died on 9 May 1571 leaving Bille a widow. Included in his estate were 500 farms, 60 cottages, 14 mills, Knutstrup Castle, manor houses in the country, and houses in Copenhagen. His estate was not fully settled until 1574.

== Book collector ==
In 2007 the young Mexican scholar Juan Pablo Ortiz-Hernández edited an unknown Spanish book of songs belonging to Otte Brahe. The publication of the collection of poems was prepared by Ortiz and the hispanist Kenneth Brown and Rachel Schmidt was quoted as saying it represented "a significant contribution to the study of 15th century Spanish 'cancionero' poetry".
