= Kågeröd Church =

- Kågeröds kyrka
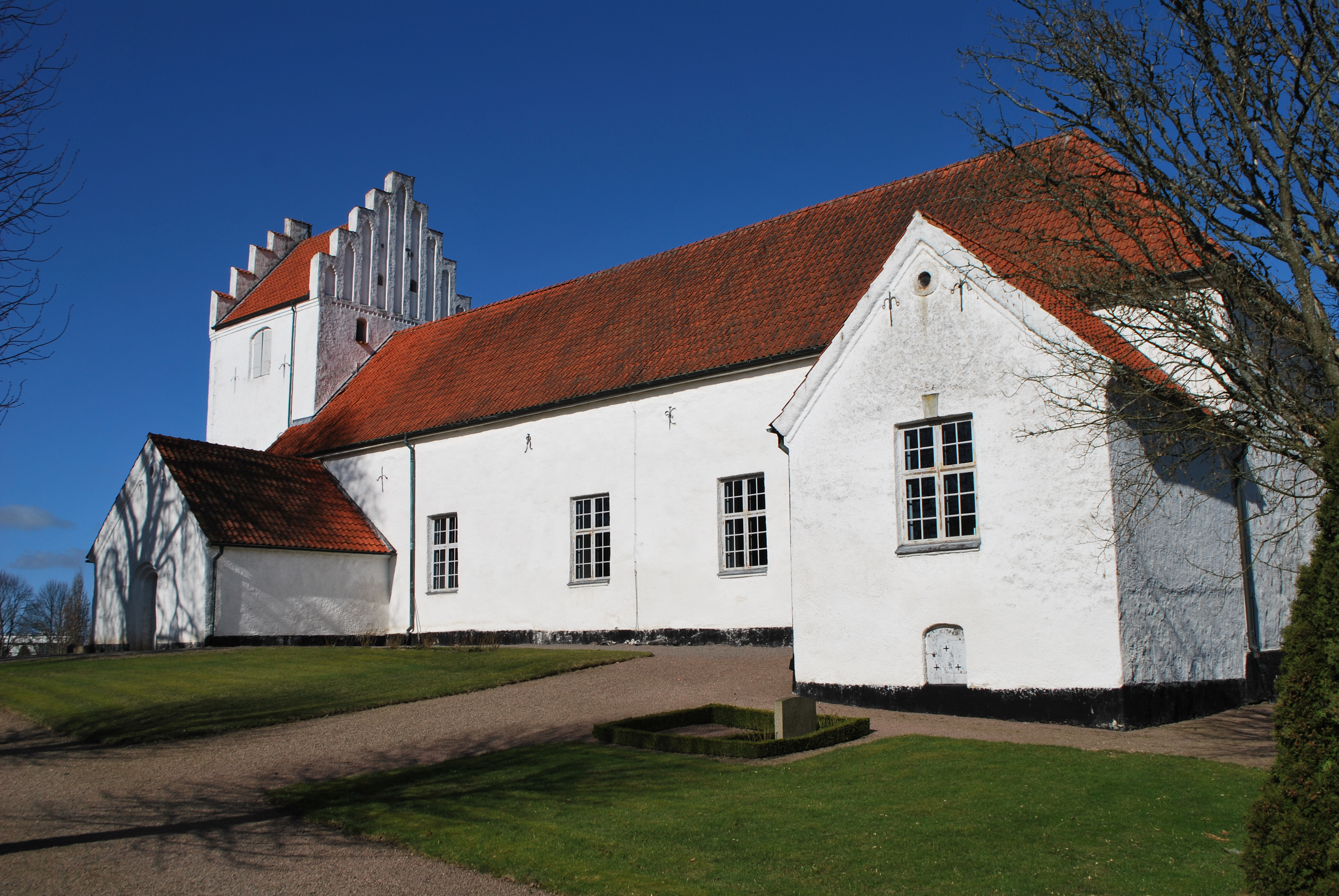
- Kågeröd Church

- Location within Skåne Location within Sweden Location within Europe
- 56°00′01″N 13°05′20″E
- Country: Sweden
- Denomination: Church of Sweden

Kågeröd Church (Swedish: Kågeröds kyrka) is a medieval church in Kågeröd (Svalöv Municipality) in the province of Scania, Sweden. It dates from the end of the 12th or early 13th century, and has been successively enlarged and rebuilt, not least by the local aristocratic families Brahe and Wachtmeister. The church contains several historic furnishings, and is richly decorated with 15th-century murals.

== History and architecture ==
The church was constructed at the end of the 12th or early 13th century. It originally consisted only of a nave, chancel and an apse. The southern church porch was probably added during the 14th century, the tower a century later. During the 15th century the interior of the church was also remade, with vaults built to support the ceiling. During the final years of the same century, the church was substantially enlarged towards the east. In the 1560s, a new chancel was constructed, as well as a burial chapel for the family Brahe, who had holdings in the area; it today serves as the sacristy.

The church was expanded by an addition to the north in 1780, and in 1797 the top of the tower was given its current appearance, with crow-stepped gables. These additions were financed by the Wachtmeister family, owners of nearby Knutstorp Castle.

== Murals and furnishings ==
The church is richly decorated with medieval murals. They date from the late 15th century and were made to decorate the new vaulted ceiling. They depict scenes from the Old and the New Testament.

Among the furnishings, the baptismal font is the oldest, dated to c. 1200 and made of sandstone. The church also contains an unusual, medieval iron chandelier. The wooden pulpit is richly decorated with scenes from the Old and New Testament, and sculptures depicting the Four Evangelists. It dates from 1696. The altarpiece is only slightly later, from 1703, and contains a depiction of Mary and John the Evangelist next to Christ on the cross.

== Gallery ==
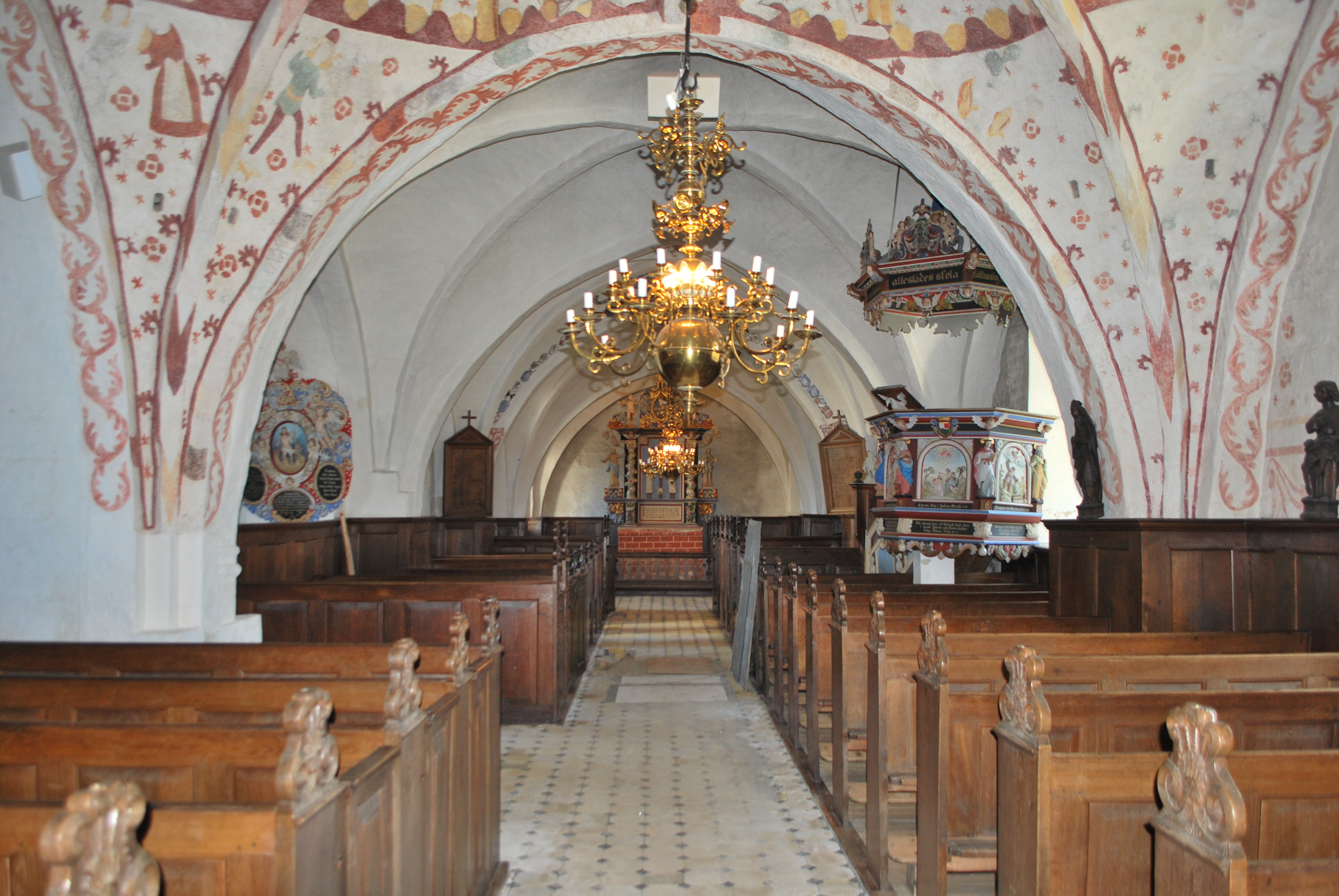
View of the interior towards the east

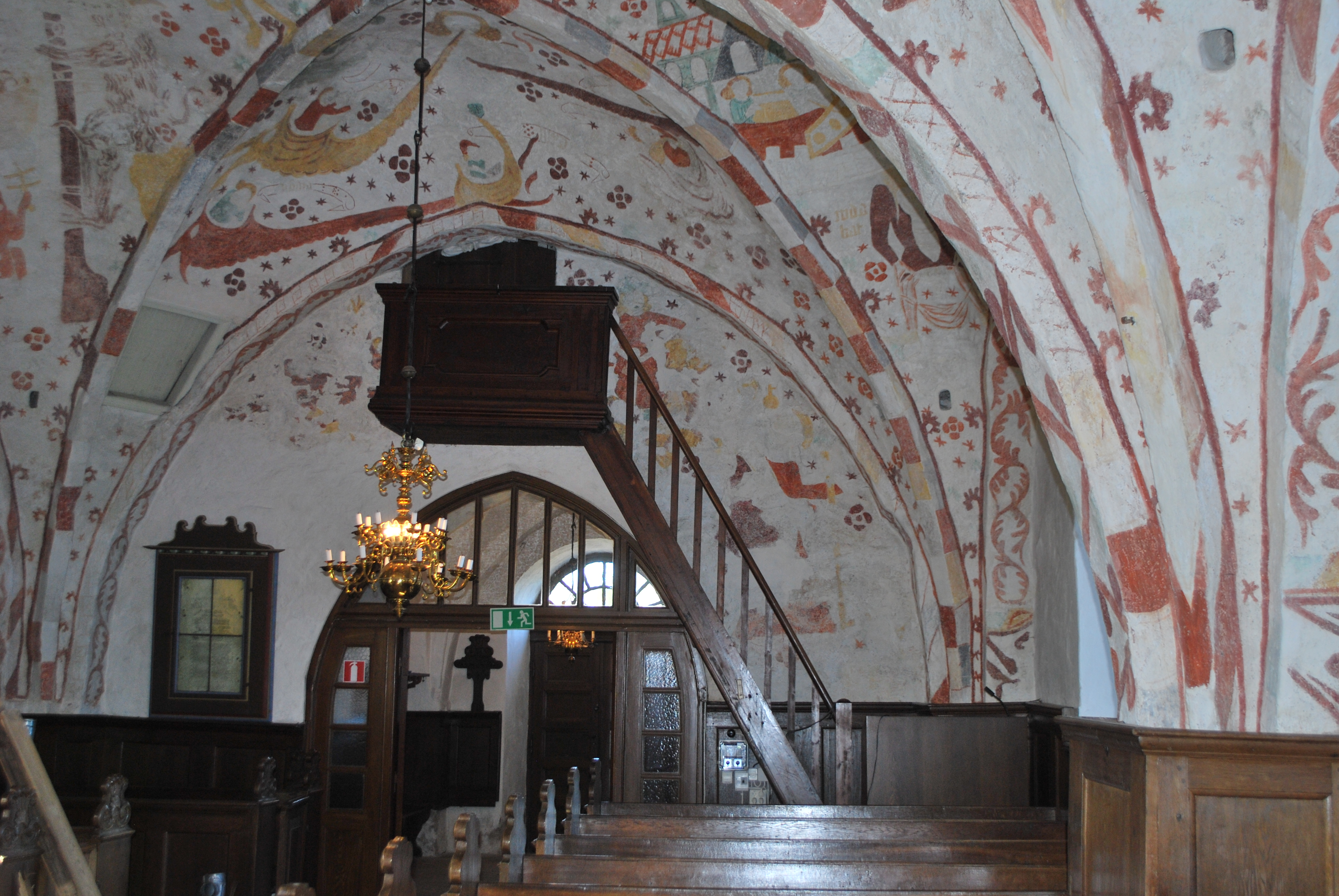
View of the interior towards the west

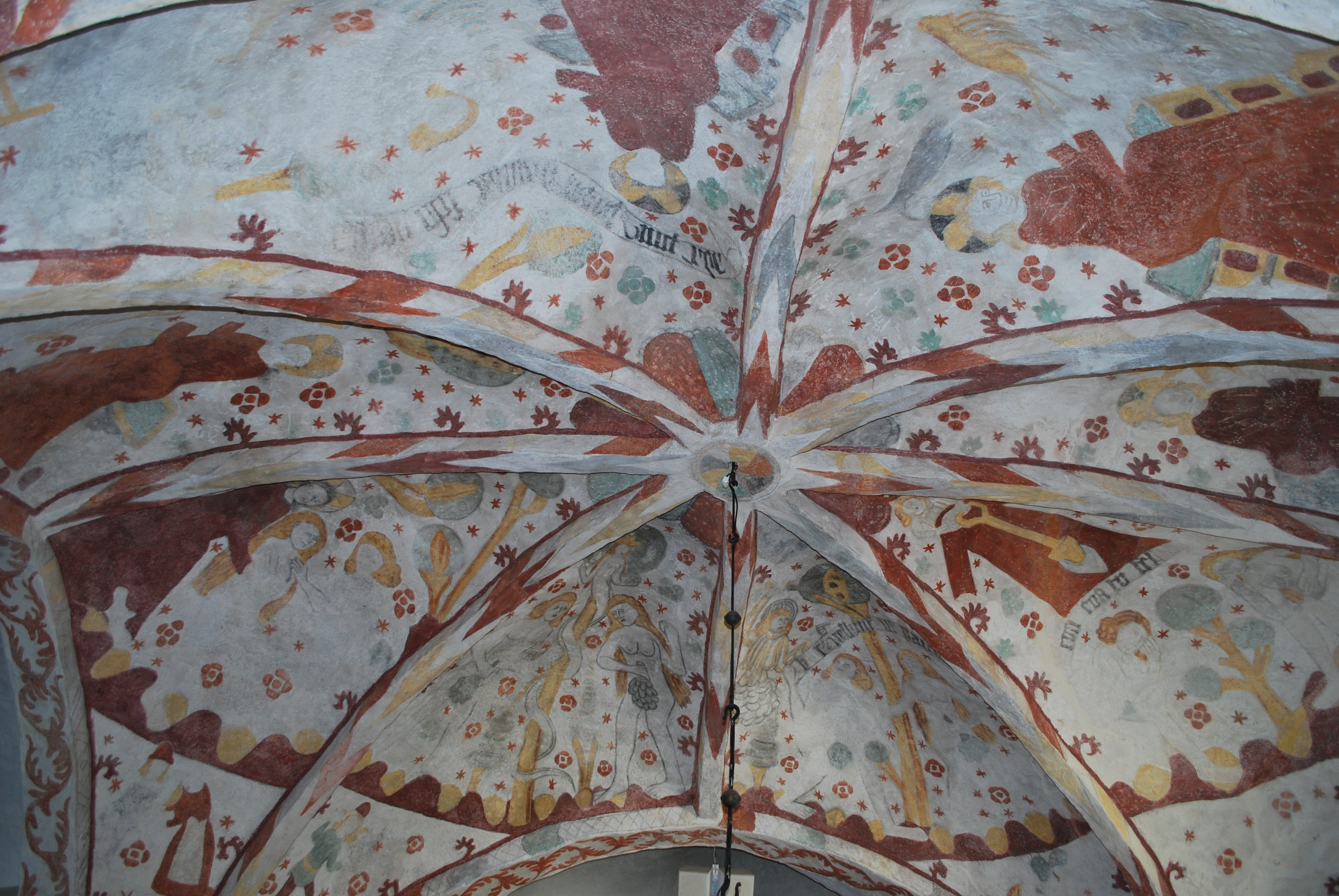
Detail of one of the vaults with murals

== See also ==
- Church murals in Sweden
- Church frescos in Denmark
