= Anne Rud =

Danish noble and landholder

- Born: Anne Jørgensdatter Rud
- Died: 1533
- Spouse: Henrich Krummedige
- Parent(s): Jørgen Mikkelsen Rud; Kirstine Eriksdatter Rosenkrantz
- Relatives: Otte Brahe (nephew); Tycho Brahe (grandnephew)

Anne Jørgensdatter Rud (died 1533), was a Danish noble and landholder. She was the daughter of Danish riksråd Jørgen Rud and Kirstine Rosenkrantz and married in 1493 to Danish-Norwegian Henrich Krummedige, commanding officer of the Bohus Fortress in Norway. During the war between her spouse and Knut Alvsson, she defended Bohus Fortress in the absence of Krummedige (1502).
