= Tosterup Castle =

Castle in Scania, Sweden

- Tosterups slott
- Tomelilla Municipality
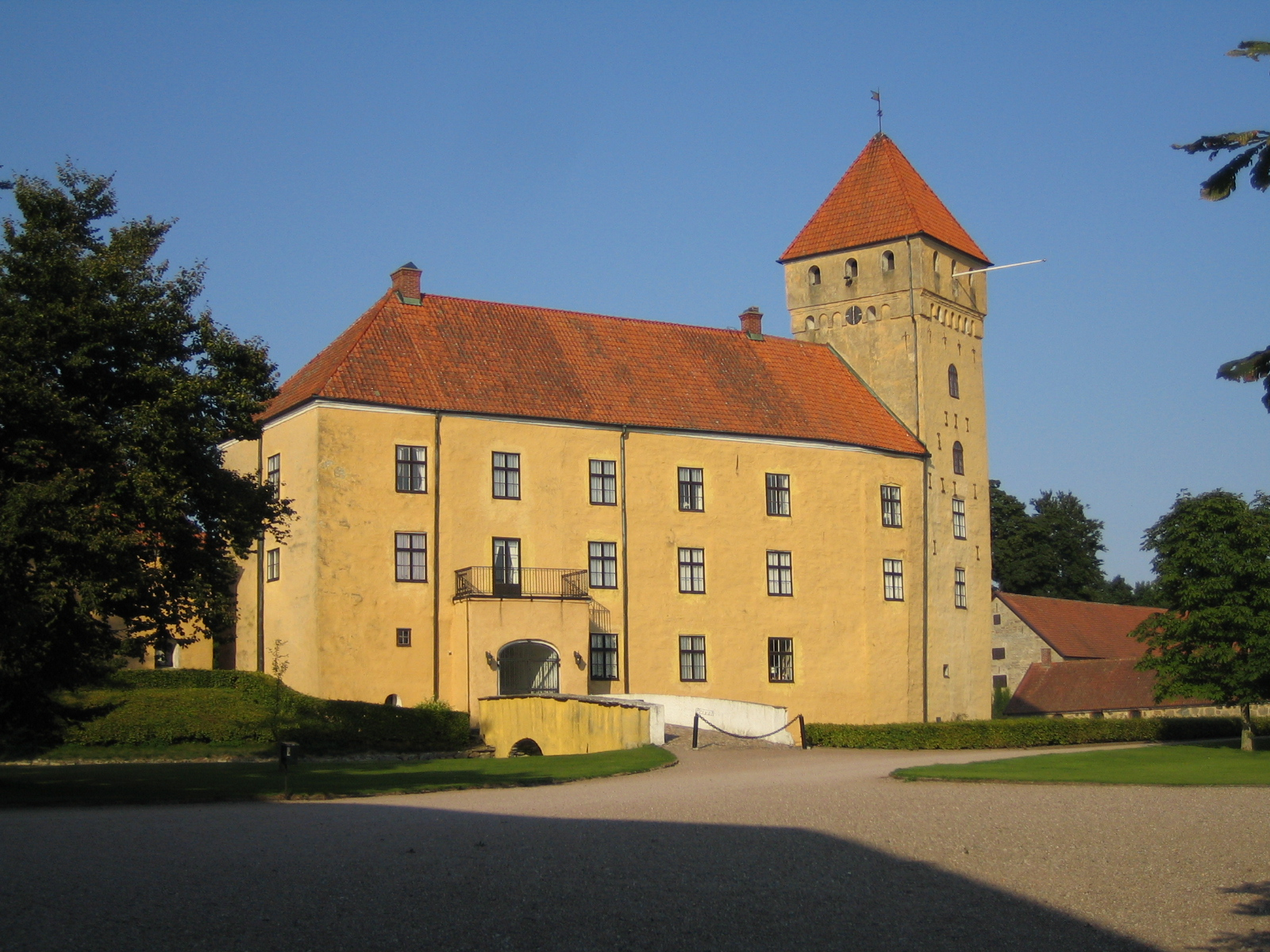
- Tosterup Castle

Site information
- Type: Castle
- Open to the public: No

Location
- Scania, Sweden
- Location within Skåne
- Coordinates: 55.48°N 13.986389°E

Site history
- Built: 15th century

Tosterup Castle (Swedish: Tosterups slott) is a castle in Tomelilla Municipality, Scania, in southern Sweden approximately 12 kilometres (7.5 mi) northeast of Ystad.

Owners have included Jörgen Tygesen Brahe, Otte Tygesen Brahe, Rutger von Ascheberg, Margareta von Ascheberg, Eric Ruuth, Johan Sparre af Söfdeborg, and Carl August Ehrensvärd.

== See also ==
- List of castles in Sweden
