= Sophia Brahe =

Danish horticulturalist

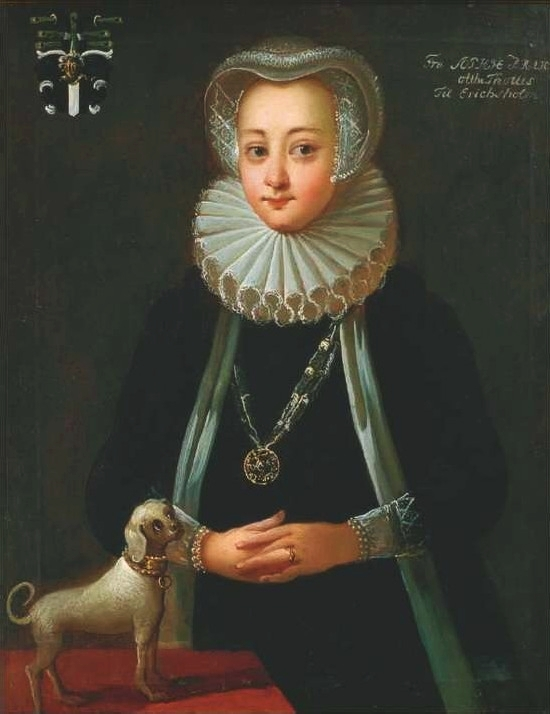
- Portrait from 1602
- Born: 24 August 1559 (or 22 September 1556); Knutstorp, Denmark–Norway
- Died: 1643 (aged 83–84); Helsingør, Denmark–Norway
- Known for: Working with her brother Tycho Brahe on making astronomical observations, creating exceptional gardens at Trolleholm Castle, genealogist of Danish noble families
- Spouses: Otto Thott (m. 1579; died 1588); Erik Lange (m. 1602; died 1613)
- Children: Tage Thott

Sophia (or Sophie) Thott Lange (née Brahe; 24 August 1559 or 22 September 1556 – 1643), known by her maiden name, was a Danish noblewoman and horticulturalist with knowledge of astronomy, chemistry, and medicine. She worked alongside her brother Tycho Brahe in making astronomical observations.

== Life ==
She was born in Knudstrup Castle, Denmark (Note: Scania, in which the castle is situated, became part of Sweden in 1658. Today the castle is known as Knutstorp.) as the youngest of ten children, to Otte Brahe, the rigsråd, or advisor, to the King of Denmark; and Beate Bille, leader of the royal household for Queen Sophie. Sophia's oldest brother was astronomer Tycho Brahe. Though he was both more than a decade her senior and raised in a separate household, the pair became quite close by the time Sophia was a teenager. The brother and sister were united by their work in science, and by their family's opposition to science as an appropriate activity for members of the aristocracy. They both desired a life filled with science and knowledge instead of the duties of a noble person.

She married Otto Thott in 1579, when he was 33 and she was at least twenty, though possibly older. They had one child before he died on 23 March 1588. Their son was Tage Thott, born in 1580. Upon her husband's death, Sophia Thott managed his property in Eriksholm (today Trolleholm Castle), running the estate to keep it profitable until her son came of age. During this time, she also became a horticulturalist, in addition to her studies in chemistry and medicine. The gardens she created in Eriksholm were said to be exceptional. Sophia was particularly interested in studying chemistry and medicine according to Paracelsus, in which small doses of poison might serve as strong medicines, and used her skills to treat the local poor. Sophie enjoyed the partial freedom she was allowed in the medical field. However, women were often not entitled to receive a college degree, the lack of which prevented her from practicing medicine as a legitimate physician. Similarly, she was devoted to the study of astrology and helped her brother with producing horoscopes.

On 21 July 1587, King Frederick II of Denmark signed a document transferring to Sophia Brahe the title of Årup farm in what is now Sweden.

Sophia continued to be a frequent visitor at Uraniborg where she met Erik Lange, a nobleman who studied alchemy and a friend of Tycho's. Erik Lange was a nobleman yet had little money to his name. His pursuit of alchemy left him financially unstable. He was especially fixated on producing gold, which led to his monetary problems. In 1590, Sophia took 13 visits to Uraniborg and became engaged to Lange. Since Lange used up most of his fortune with alchemy experiments, their marriage was delayed some years while he avoided his creditors and traveled to Germany to try to find patrons for his work. Tycho Brahe wrote the Latin epic poem "Urania Titani" during the couple's separation, expressed as a letter from his sister Sophia to her fiancé in 1594. Tycho casts Sophia as Urania, muse of astronomy, a further suggestion of his respect for her scientific endeavours.

In 1599, she visited Lange in Hamburg, but they did not marry until 1602 in Eckernförde. They lived in this town for a while in extreme poverty. Sophia wrote a long letter to her sister Margrethe Brahe, describing having to wear stockings with holes in them for her wedding. Lange's wedding clothes had to be returned to the pawn shop after the wedding, because the couple could not afford to keep them. She expressed anger with her family for not accepting her science studies, and for depriving her of money owed to her. By 1608, Erik Lange was living in Prague, and he died there in 1613 (Det Kongelige Bibliotek).

Sophia was often ridiculed and avoided due to her personal life and marriage. Many alienated her due to her marriage to Erik Lange which was opposed by all in her family except for her brother Tycho.

Sophia Brahe personally financed the restoration of the local church, Ivetofta Kyrka. She planned to be buried there, and the lid for her unused sarcophagus remains in the church's armory. But, by 1616 she had moved permanently to Zealand and settled in Helsingør. In Zealand, she lived specifically in Elsinore where she worked primarily on horticulture and healing plants. She spent her last years writing up the genealogy of Danish noble families, publishing the first major version in 1626 (there were later additions). Her work is still considered a major source for early history of Danish nobility (Det Kongelige Bibliotek). She died in Helsingør in the year 1643, and was buried in the Torrlösa old church in the village of Torrlösa, east of the town of Landskrona in what was then Denmark but now is southern Sweden. That church housed a burial chapel for the Thott family that remained for some time even after the church itself was pulled down in the mid-19th century (the new Torrlösa church was built nearby). Currently, a stone setting marks the outlines of the Thott chapel, while the tombstone for Sophie Brahe is still standing on the site.

== Career and research ==
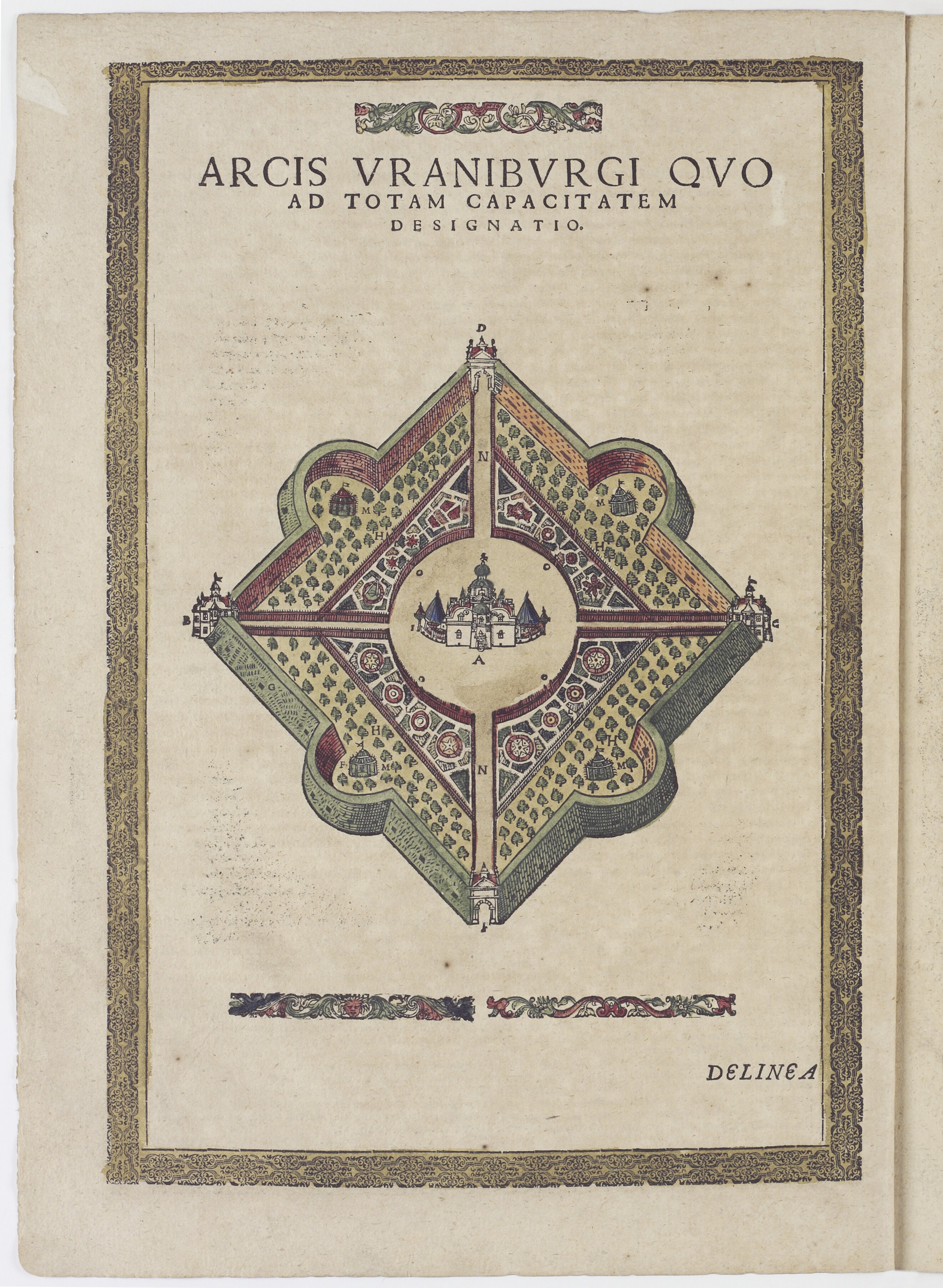
A woodcut image of Tycho Brahe's Uranienborg observatory

Tycho wrote that he had trained Sophia in horticulture and chemistry, but initially discouraged her from studying astronomy. Undeterred, Sophia learned astronomy on her own, studying books in German, and having Latin books translated with her own money so that she could read them as well. Much of Tycho's apprehension about Sophia's learning actually did not come from concerns about her ability to perform astronomical observations. Rather, he worried that she would not be able to achieve the level of understanding necessary to work in the field of astrology, which was inextricably linked to astronomy. As astrologers, the Brahes would have been expected to provide horoscopes, which would have been taken very seriously by their customers. Later in both of their careers, Tycho once again discouraged her from continuing her research into astronomy, which he believed to be too complex for the talents of a woman.

According to some references, Sophia was already working as an assistant to Tycho during the 1573 lunar eclipse. In the following years, Sophia frequently visited Uraniborg, Tycho's observatory on the then-Danish island of Hveen. While Tycho created many of the astronomical devices used to conduct the measurements, Sophia was among the assistants who actually made the measurements. Tycho did have other assistants, however, and while Sophia was present for each of these discoveries, the extent to which she contributed personally is unknown. Tycho did commend Sophia for her efforts, though, referring with admiration to Sophia's animus invictus, or "determined mind."After her series of contributions in the 1570s, Sophia achieved more autonomy with regards to her astronomical research than before. Despite the serious doubts Tycho had previously expressed about Sophia's ability to comprehend the nuances of horoscopes, when he was frequently away from Uranienborg between 1588 and 1597, Sophia took on much of Tycho's astrological responsibilities with their clients.

Sophia remarried in 1602 to the alchemist Erik Lange, who like many alchemists was striving to change different metals into gold. Meanwhile, Tycho and Sophie both rejected the idea of creating gold via alchemy. In the pursuit of this goal Lange, with the support of his wife, spent all of the money that the two had saved. They lived in extreme poverty until Erik Lange passed away. This allowed Brahe to move back to Denmark, where her son likely supported her financially. Then she continued her work in science, and wrote an early genealogy of Danish noble families still used today.

== Urania Titani ==
"Urania Titani" was a six-hundred-line poem written in February 1594 about a fictional love correspondence between Sophia and Erik. The poem was written in 1594 but was published in 1668 by Peder Resen. "Urania Titani" was written in an Ovidian heroid form. In an Ovidian heroid form, the poem reads as a series of letters from a female protagonist to her lover. The form's name, Ovidian heroid, comes from the Roman poet Ovid.

The poem "Urania Titani" has been contested on who wrote it: some say it was Sophia, while others believe it was her brother Tycho. Peder Resen, the publisher of "Urania Titani", thought that Sophia was the author due to her role as the narrator. However, Tycho wrote a letter to Thomas Craig on 26 July 1594, in which Tycho stated he was the author. Likewise, the Ovidian heroid form had never been used in Denmark, where Sophia was from. The first poem in that form from Denmark, which we know of, was written in 1775. That would have been approximately 200 years after "Urania Titani" was written. Therefore, the likelihood that Sophia knew of this type of poem is slim compared to her brother. There is no evidence that would prove Tycho's statement to Thomas Craig as incorrect. Meanwhile, some think that Sophia helped Tycho write "Urania Titani." This is because Tycho wrote the poem in Latin, a language Sophia was not fluent in. Yet the poem was very personal, so some people think that Tycho must have had help in creating "Urania Titani."

"Urania Titani" contains a love story and descriptions of Sophia, Tycho, and Erik's horoscopes, which helps historians narrow down their correct birthdates. In the poem, Tycho represents Sophia as Urania, the Muse of astronomy in Greek mythology, and Erik as a Titan, a son of Uranus (mythology). Sophia is depicted as longing for her husband while he was studying alchemy abroad. The poem contains personal and sensitive information. For example, the poem describes Sophia's desire to have a child with her second husband, Erik Lange. "Urania Titani" established the co-dependence that Sophia and Tycho maintained, including their similar beliefs. Lastly, the poem was a large indicator of Tycho publicizing his bond with his sister, establishing himself as a Renaissance man and unashamed of his work with his sister.

== Genealogy ==
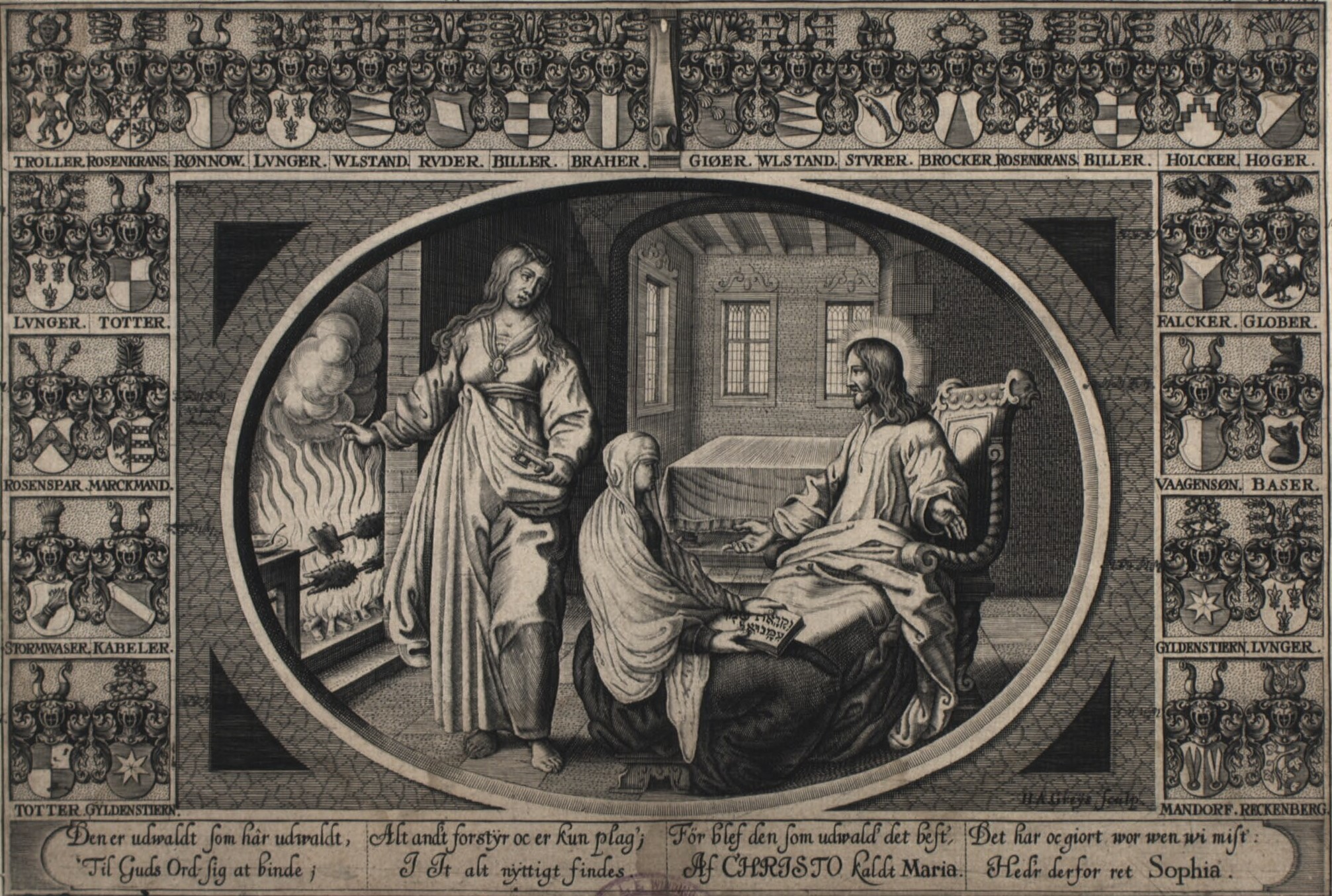
Sophie Brahe seen in a print from c. 1655.

Sophia is known for her work in genealogy. Sophia's first work was completed in 1600. During this time, genealogy was placed in documents called family books. These books contained many aspects of the family's life such as family members, traditions, and different family branches. In Sophia's renditions of her family book she included letters and correspondence with other women concerning their interwoven heritage and possible relatives. Sophia also included anecdotes from her family and rarely placed her own comments within her works. Sophia's work was common among women during her time, as women were valued for their penmanship and ability to maintain their households.

== Legacy ==
Sophia, along with her brother Tycho, have come to represent the flowering of letters and science during the Danish Renaissance. She worked closely with her brother in his scientific endeavors and is thought to have acted as his muse. The two were so close that poet Johan L. Heiberg admonished that "Denmark must never forget the noble woman who, in spirit much more than flesh and blood, was Tycho Brahe's sister; the shining star in our Danish heaven is indeed a double one." In 1626 Sophia had completed a 900-page manuscript on the genealogies of 60 Danish noble families, which is held by Lund University.

== See also ==
- Timeline of women in science
