= Rønnow =

Rønnow is a Danish surname. Notable people with the surname include:

- Anders Rønnow Klarlund (born 1971) Danish author, director, and screenwriter
- Frederik Rønnow (born 1992), Danish footballer
- Mikkel Rønnow (born 1974), Danish musician
