= Inger Oxe =

Danish noblewoman and court official

Inger Johansdatter Oxe (c. 1526 - 1591) was a Danish noblewoman and court official. She was Hofmesterinde to the Danish Queen Sophie of Mecklenburg-Güstrow between 1572 and 1584.

She was the sister to Peder Oxe Steward of the Realm, daughter of Johan Johansen Oxe and Mette Mogensdatter Gøye, and wife of Jørgen Tygesen Brahe. She was the foster mother of the Danish astronomer Tycho Brahe whom she raised as her own son.
