= Månstorp Gables =

Ruined building in Sweden

Coordinates: 55°28′42″N 13°08′13″E

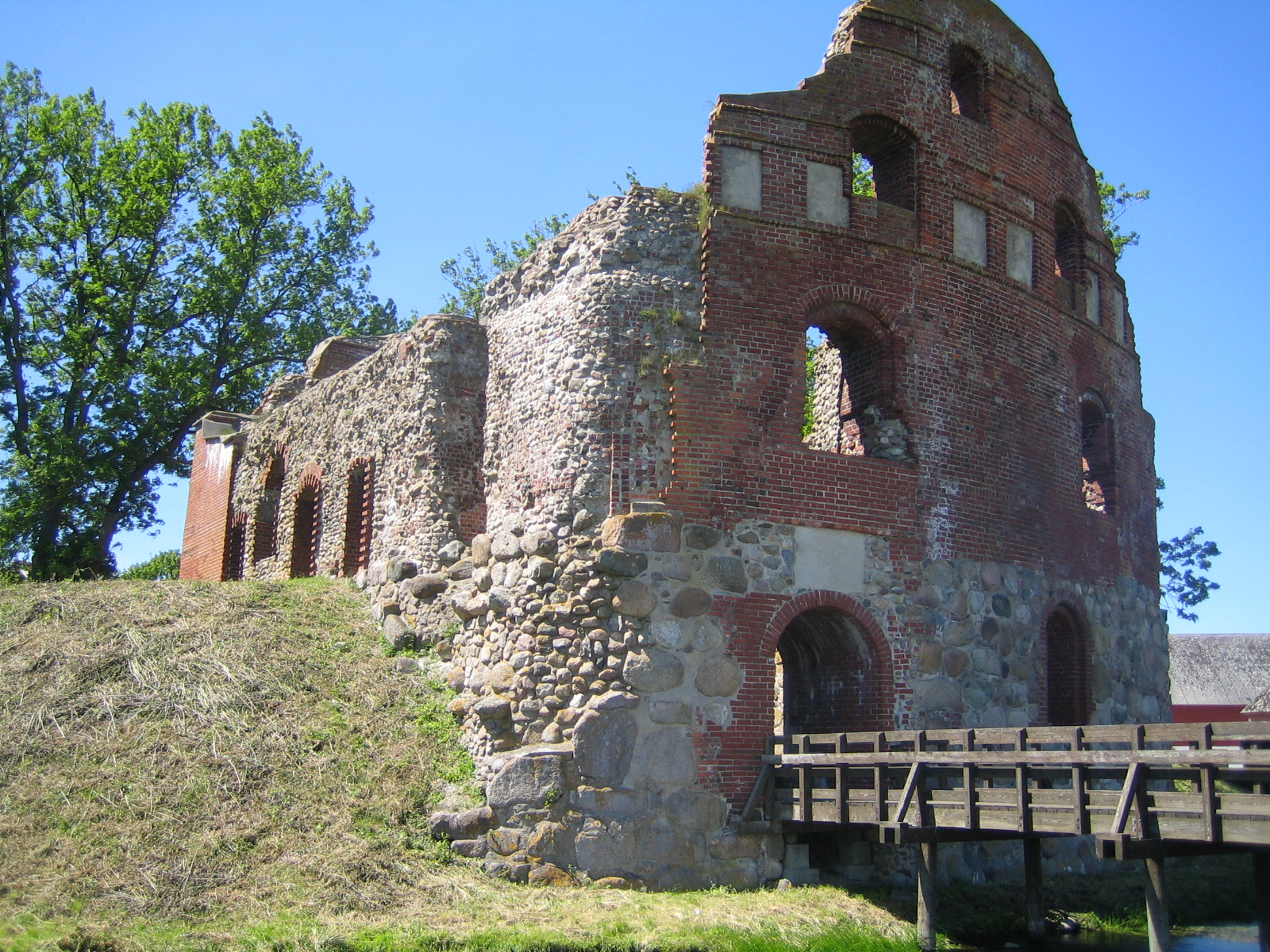
Månstorp Gables

The Månstorp Gables (Swedish: Månstorps gavlar) is a ruin in Vellinge Municipality in Skåne (the southernmost historical province of Sweden).

It is situated east of the Swedish county road 101, between Västra Ingelstad and Östra Grevie. The main building was surrounded by a circular wall and moat. During the Scanian War the castle was destroyed and is now a ruin.

== History ==
Månstorp was an old manor, Mogenstrup. Its first known owner belonged to the Danish family Hack. Later it was owned by the family Bille, notably Eske Bille who furnished Månstorp with all the luxury of the time. As part of the Scanian compensation estates for the island of Bornholm it passed from the Danish to the Swedish Crown. The castle was given to the Governor General of Scania, Lord High Admiral Gustav Otto Stenbock but later served as the colonel's residence. During the war from 1675-1679 the castle was occupied by the Swedes and destroyed in 1678. The castle was never reconstructed following its destruction, tumbling down even more to become the ruin it is today.
