= Västra Ingelstad =

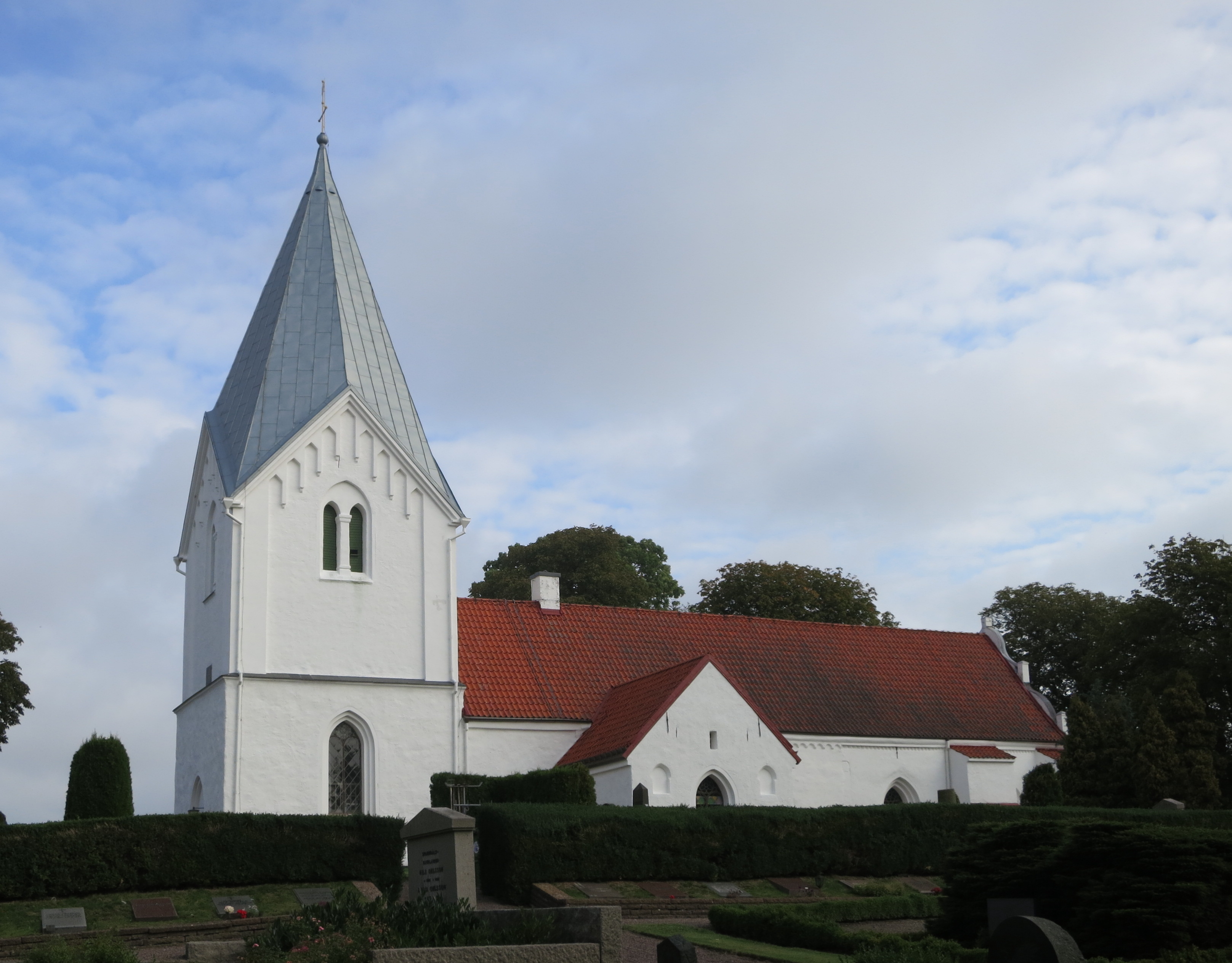
- Västra Ingelstad Church

- Location within Skåne Location within Sweden
- Coordinates: 55°29′N 13°07′E
- Country: Sweden
- Province: Skåne
- County: Skåne County
- Municipality: Vellinge Municipality

Area
  - Total: 0.57 km^{2} (0.22 sq mi)

Population (31 December 2010)
  - Total: 721
  - Density: 1,258/km^{2} (3,260/sq mi)
- Time zone: UTC+1 (CET)
  - Summer (DST): UTC+2 (CEST)

Västra Ingelstad is a locality situated in Vellinge Municipality, Skåne County, Sweden with 721 inhabitants in 2010.

Västra Ingelstad Church is a medieval church with a richly decorated altarpiece, unparalleled in the province of Skåne.
