= Knutstorp Castle =

Building in Svalöv Municipality, Sweden

- Knutstorps slott
- Svalöv Municipality
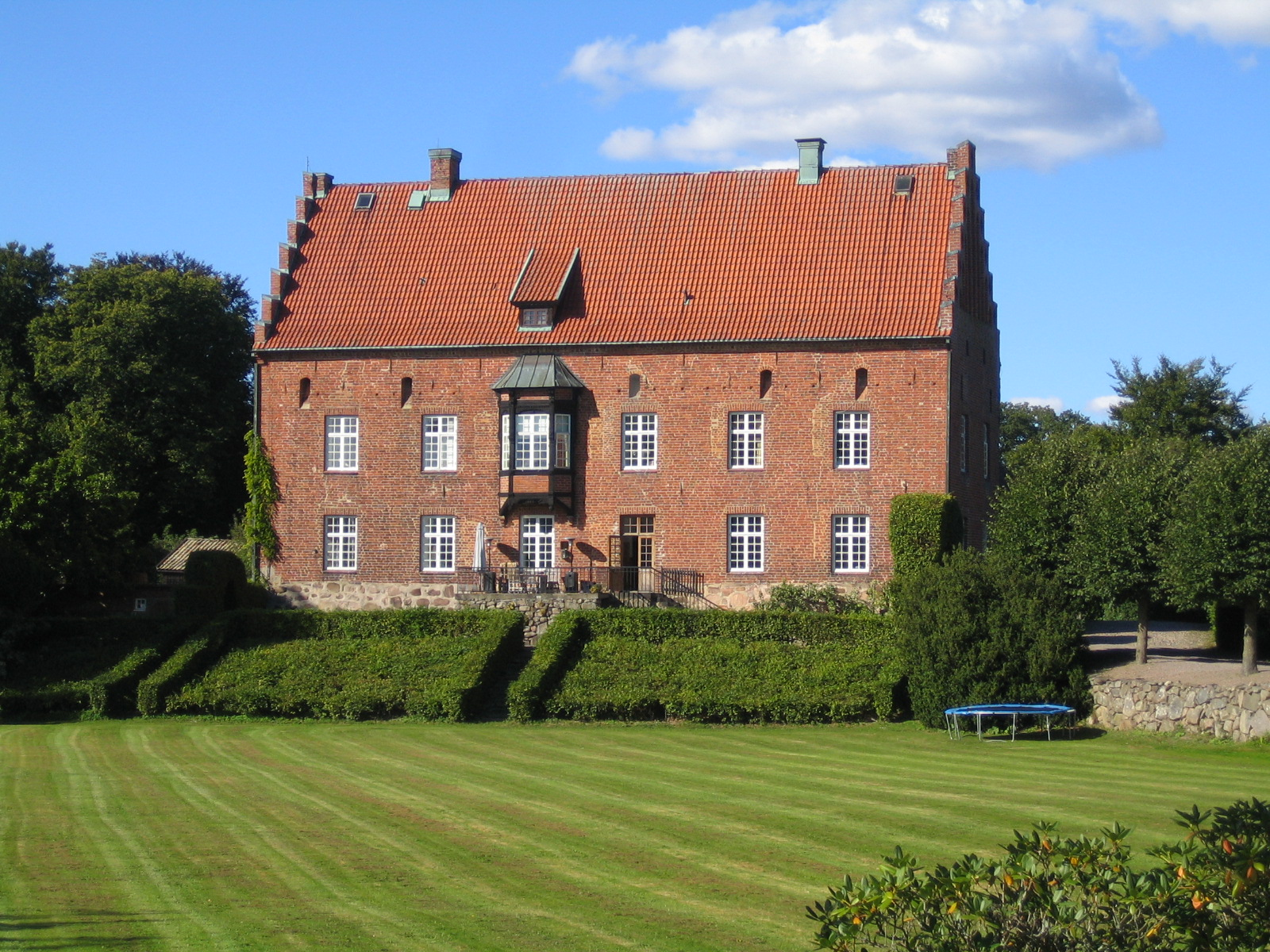
- Knutstorp Castle

Site information
- Type: manor house
- Open to the public: Guided tours

Location
- Scania, Sweden
- Location within Skåne Location within Sweden
- Coordinates: 55.9794°N 13.1347°E

Site history
- Built: 16th century

Knutstorp Castle (Swedish: Knutstorps Borg) is a manor house situated in the Svalöv Municipality of Scania, Sweden.

== History ==
A manor already in the middle of the 14th century, it was owned by the Danish Brahe noble family from the end of the Middle Ages until 1663, after Scania was ceded to Sweden in the treaty of Roskilde. The main building was completed in 1551 by the Danish Royal Privy Councilor Otte Brahe (1518–1571) and his wife Beate Clausdatter Bille (1526–1605). The estate was the birthplace of their children; the famous astronomer Tycho Brahe (1546–1601) and his astronomer sister Sophia Brahe (1556–1643).

The estate was sold in 1771 to the Swedish Count Fredrik Georg Hans Carl Wachtmeister af Johannishus (1720–1792), and has since belonged to members of his family.

The Ring Knutstorp racetrack is named after the castle.

== See also ==
- List of castles in Sweden
