= Edele =

Edele is both a surname and a female given name. People with the name include:

Surname:

- Mark Edele, Australian historian

Given name:

- Edele Jernskjæg (died 1512), Danish noble
- Edele Kruchow (1915–1989), Danish headmistress and politician
- Edele Lynch (born 1979), Irish singer, songwriter, and television personality
