= War of Deposition against King Hans =

- Part of the Dano-Swedish War (1501–1512)
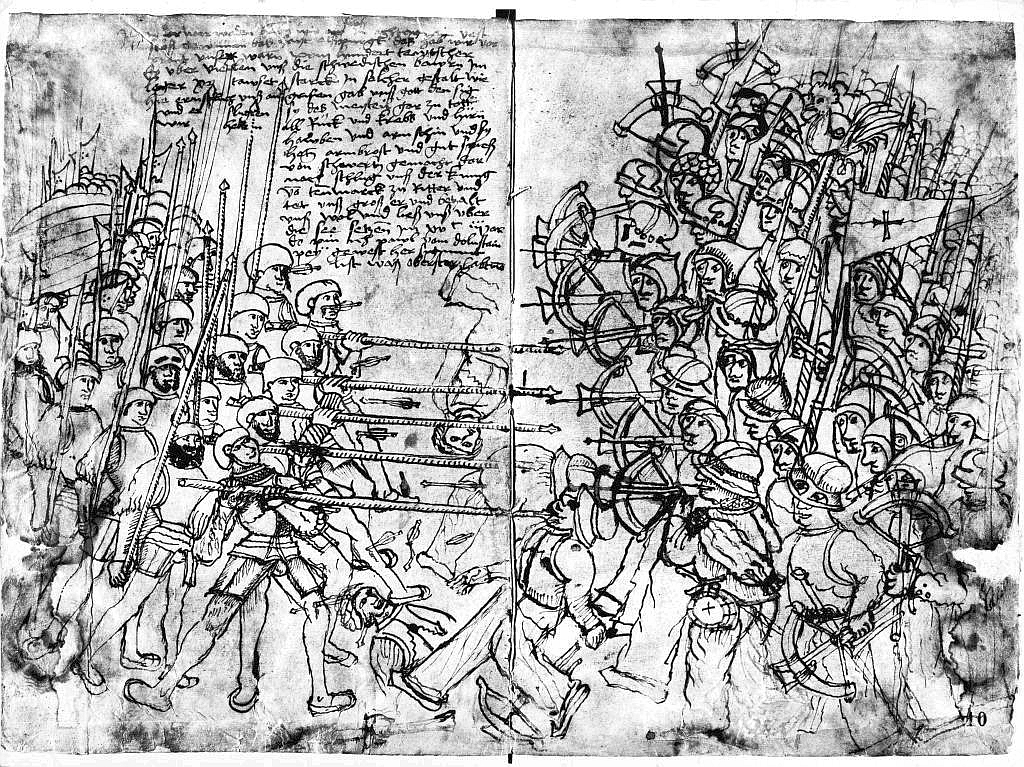
- German mercenary engineer Paul Dolnstein's drawing of a Swedish peasant host fighting German mercenaries in 1501
Date	1501–1503
Location	Sweden
Result	Separatist victory
Territorial changes	Kalmar Union de facto dissolved

Belligerents
Swedish separatists	Denmark

Commanders and leaders
Sten Sture the Elder	John (Hans) of Denmark

The War of Deposition against King Hans (Swedish: Avsättningskriget mot kung Hans) was a conflict in which Swedish separatists under the leadership of the Swedish regent Sten Sture the Elder rebelled against the newly elected king of the Kalmar Union, King Hans.

On 1 January 1501, an assembly of Swedish nobles declared the deposition of the king of the Kalmar Union, Hans, from the Swedish throne. King Hans had been elected King of Sweden four years prior, but there was great dislike of his rule and the Danish officials placed to rule in the king's stead. When the Swedish rebel army took Örebro in August 1501, the king left for Denmark to gather troops and left his queen, Christina of Saxony, in possession of Stockholm. The king was declared deposed and Sten Sture the Elder proclaimed regent. In October, Stockholm was taken, and in May 1502, Queen Christina surrendered Stockholm Castle. In the summer of 1502, the rebels took Finland, and in the spring of 1503, Kalmar was taken.

The conflict resulted in the deposition of Hans as King of Sweden, and was a part of the bigger Dano-Swedish War (1501–1512).
