= Brother Jacob =

Brother Jacob may refer to:

- Jacob the Dacian (c. 1484 – 1566), Danish Franciscan friar
- "Brother Jacob", a short story by George Eliot
