= Treaty of Malmö (1512) =

The Treaty of Malmö (Swedish: Freden i Malmö), actually consisted of two and a quarter peace treaties that were all signed on 23 April 1512, bringing an end to the second Dano-Swedish War.

The first treaty included the King of Denmark, John (Danish: Hans) and Sweden. The other treaty dictated peace terms between the same king and the Free City of Lübeck. The rest was a formal demand to King Louis XII of France to settle his disputes with Pope Julius II.

The original peace treaties are preserved in entirety at the Danish National Archives in Copenhagen and at the Public Library of Lübeck. The French envoy Pierre Cordier's original report documenting his visit can be found in Malmö and at the public library in Besançon.

== The peace agreements ==
=== Denmark-Lübeck/The Hansa ===
The agreement between Denmark and Lübeck/The Hansa are written in Low German. It contains 17 points, the most important ones are listed here:

- The damages suffered by both parties shall be deemed equal and all prisoners shall be released,
- "vagabonds" shall no longer be kept at sea, meaning all privateering and hijackings shall cease,
- confiscated property shall be released by both parties,
- tolls in Öresund shall be paid for by the Hansa according to the rules established by previous monarchs,
- all in the kingdom (Denmark) and in the Wendish cities (the Hansa) shall have the right to free travel between each other, just like in old times,
- citizens of [the] realm and cities shall have the right to freely maintain merchandise and trade wherever they travel, shall not be forced to sell or buy a certain good; they shall also have the right to carry their own goods on their person and travel wherever they wish; additionally, no new tolls or other charges shall be introduced.
- Hostilities between the Wendish cities and the Dutch shall not lead to combat at sea ("the seas under Skåne and Blekinge" and the Baltic Sea are mentioned), nor shall any hostilities endanger a monarch,
- (The trading tax that apply to Hanseatic merchants in Stockholm shall be lowered from ten percent to five percent),
- his Majesty and his dear son (referring to the Danish monarch and prince) in their realms and countries shall defend and protect "us and other Wendic cities",
- earlier privileges shall be confirmed (by the king) and wishes of new privileges shall be presented "in a safe and comfortable location in Denmark",
- no business (with the King) shall take place unless the Hansa approves of it,
- the monarch shall not allow persons who rebel against us in their realms,
- if a conflict were to ensue between the kingdom and the Wendic cities, both sides are to name four men each who shall together work out a peaceful solution.

Swedish envoys, representatives from the Papacy and an envoy sent by James V of Scotland among others, were present at the signing of the treaty.

In addition to the peace document, a letter which seems to have been kept secret was signed in Malmö. Its contents instructs the lone city of Lübeck to pay 30 000 Rhenish ducats to Denmark during a period of 12 years (2500 ducats per year).

=== Denmark-Sweden ===
The Dano-Swedish peace agreement is written in Danish and is not as detailed as the Dano-Lübeckian. The list of both sides' and foreign representatives along with their intents, is longer than in the Dano-Lübeckian, but the agreement addresses a meeting which is planned for the 24 June 1513 where 12 men from Denmark and Norway, and 12 men from Sweden shall decide whether or not Sweden will accept King John or his heir Christian as the true lord and King of the Swedish realm. If Sweden were not to accept, they should give King John "a sizable sum of money". How large this sum should be would be decided by the 24 men. If they would be unable to come to a unanimous decision, the Hansa would be tasked with acting as mediators.

== Sources ==
The original documents can be found in Copenhagen, Lübeck and in Besançon.

- The documents detailing the peace agreement between Sweden and Denmark, as well as the Hansa and Denmark can be found at the Danish National Archives.
- The German copies of the Dano-German peace treaty ("AHL, Urkunden Externa, Danica 266") can be found at the Lübeck City Library. The documents had been evacuated during World War II, but were recovered in East Germany in 1987.
- Pierre Cordier's handwritten report to Louis XII is known locally as "Processus verbalis...". It can be found at Bibliothèque municipale d'étude et de conservation in Besançon, France. A PDF file of Processus verbalis is available at the Malmö City Library.
