= Hans, King of Denmark =

Scandinavian king under the Kalmar Union (1455–1513)

Hans
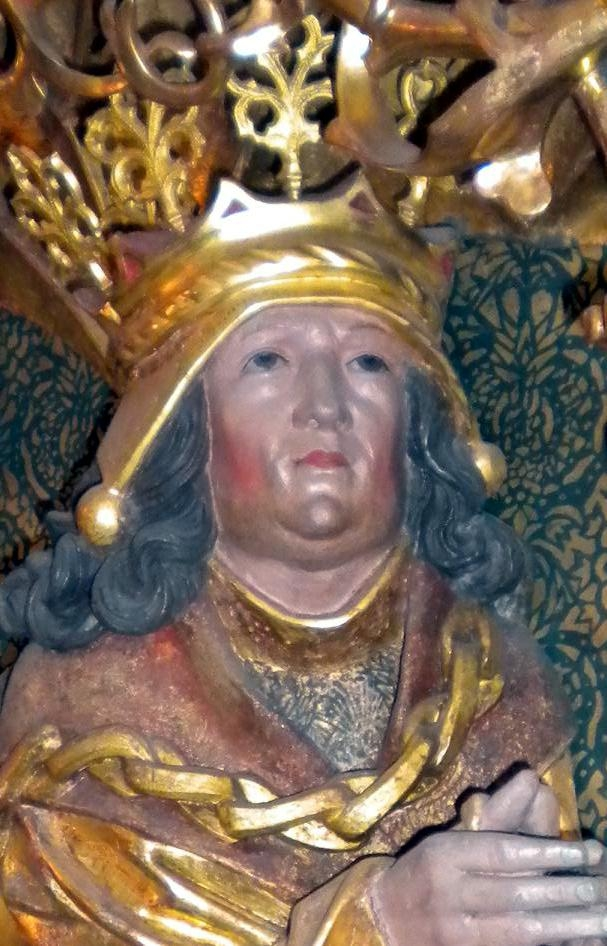
- Sculpture from altarpiece by Claus Berg (c. 1530), St. Canute's Cathedral, Odense

King of Denmark
- Reign: 1482 – 20 February 1513
- Coronation: 18 May 1483; Church of Our Lady, Copenhagen
- Predecessor: Christian I
- Successor: Christian II

King of Norway
- Reign: 1483 – 20 February 1513
- Coronation: 20 July 1483; Nidaros Cathedral
- Predecessor: Christian I
- Successor: Christian II

King of Sweden
- Reign: 6 October 1497 – August 1501
- Coronation: 26 November 1497, Stockholm
- Predecessor: Karl Knutsson
- Successor: Christian II
- Born: 2 February 1455; Aalborghus Castle, Aalborg, Denmark
- Died: 20 February 1513 (aged 58); Aalborghus Castle, Aalborg, Denmark
- Burial: St. Canute's Cathedral, Odense (from 1807)
- Spouse: Christina of Saxony (m. 1478)
- Issue among others...: Christian II; Elizabeth, Electress of Brandenburg; Jacob the Dacian (probably)
- House: Oldenburg
- Father: Christian I of Denmark
- Mother: Dorothea of Brandenburg
- Religion: Roman Catholic

Hans, or sometimes called John (also Johannes; 2 February 1455 – 20 February 1513), was a Scandinavian monarch who ruled under the Kalmar Union. He was King of Denmark from 1482 to 1513, King of Norway from 1483 to 1513, and King of Sweden (where he has also been called Johan II) from 1497 to 1501. Additionally, from 1482 to 1513, he held the titles of Duke of Schleswig and Holstein, which he governed jointly with his brother, Frederick.

The three most important political goals of King Hans were the restoration of the Kalmar Union, reduction of the dominance of the Hanseatic League, and the building of a strong Danish royal power.

== Early life and accession ==
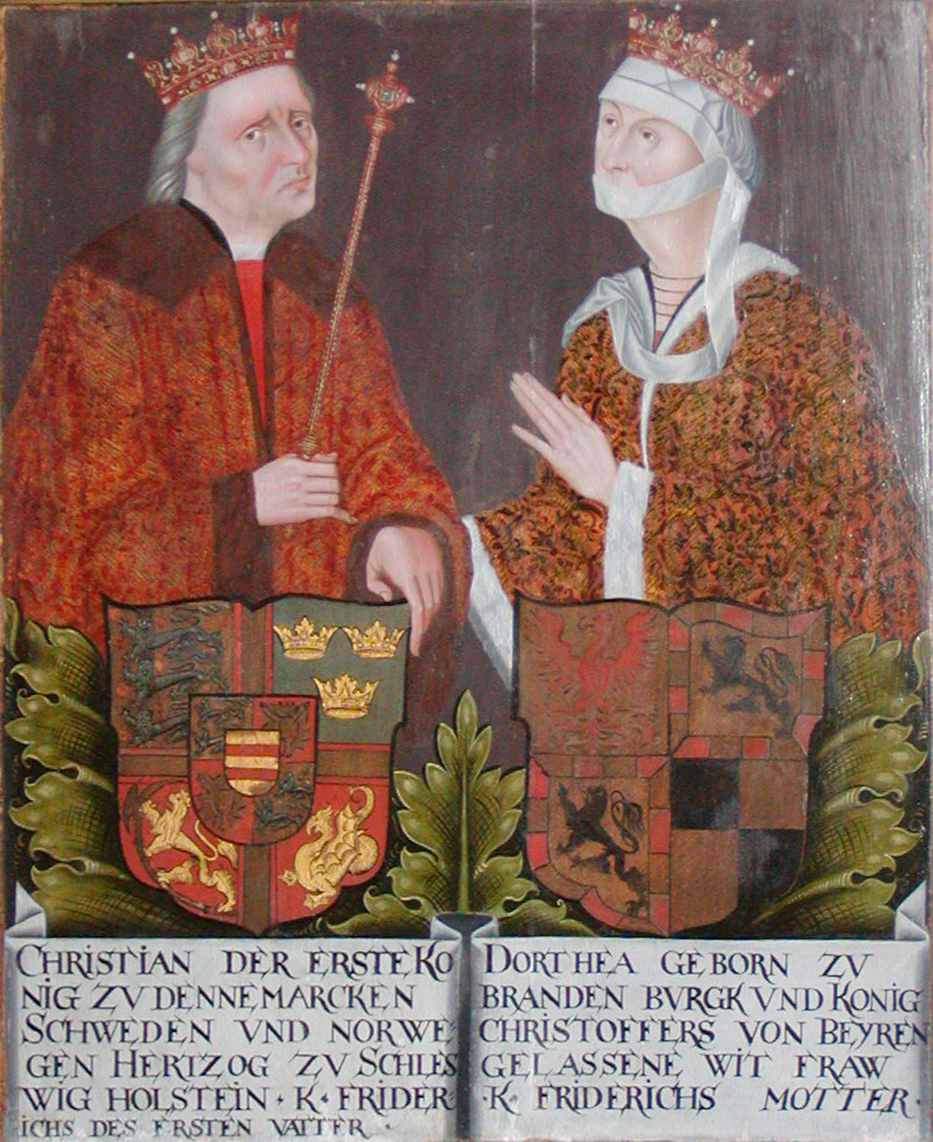
Hans's parents, King Christian and Queen Dorothea

Hans was born on 2 February 1455, probably at Aalborg in Northern Jutland. He was the third son of King Christian I of Denmark and Dorothea of Brandenburg, but the eldest to survive infancy. Dorothea was the daughter of Margrave John of Brandenburg.

=== Negotiations on the union ===
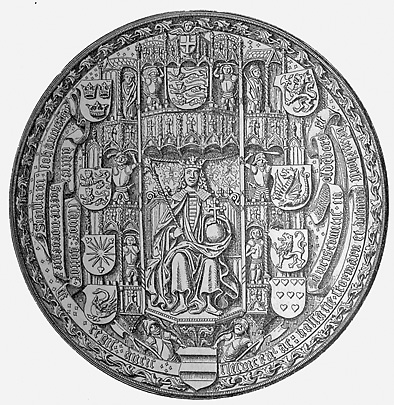
Seal of King Hans of Denmark, Norway and Sweden

Christian had his son Hans proclaimed as future ruler in the three kingdoms of Denmark, Norway, and Sweden. However, a rebellion in 1464 forced Christian to relinquish the Swedish crown. Christian attempted to retake Sweden in 1470, but his forces were defeated by Sten Sture the Elder at the Battle of Brunkeberg in October 1471.

Upon King Christian's death in May 1481, there was no dispute over the order of succession in the kingdoms, but the accession nevertheless proved difficult. Negotiations on the terms of Hans's accession started between the councils of the realms and an interregnum ensued. The Oldenburgs and the Danish council wanted to reintegrate Sweden into the union but ultimately had to settle for a limited union between Denmark and Norway.

In Denmark, Hans was unchallenged, but the Norwegian council, dissatisfied with King Christian's previous policies, sought stronger guarantees before accepting Hans's rule. Union-critical factions within Norway also reached out to Sweden, and on 1 February 1482, the two kingdoms concluded a treaty in Oslo, agreeing not to proceed with the forthcoming royal election without consulting the other. In response, the Danish leadership tried to undermine this alliance by initiating separate negotiations with each kingdom. In Denmark, Hans was acclaimed in the spring of 1482.

A meeting between the councils of Denmark, Sweden and Norway was appointed for 13 January 1483 at Halmstad to work out Hans's håndfæstning, or coronation charter. When the Swedish Council failed to turn up at the meeting, the Norwegian and Danish councils proceeded to issue a joint declaration known as the Halmstad Recess. This document outlined the conditions for Hans's rule, strengthening the authority of the councils and affirming that the union was a personal union of three independent kingdoms. It was hoped that Sweden would later accept the same terms and thereby acknowledge Hans as king. Hans was crowned King of Denmark in Copenhagen on 18 May 1483, and King of Norway in Trondheim on 20 July.

As negotiations with the Swedish Council continued, a separate agreement known as the Kalmar Recess was drafted on 9 September 1483. Intended to complement the Halmstad Recess, it included additional guarantees aimed at limiting royal authority and safeguarding the privileges of the Swedish Council of the Realm. Among the Swedish demands was the restoration of Gotland, a condition that proved unacceptable to King Hans. The negotiations ultimately broke down in 1484 over the Gotland question, and Hans was not crowned king of Sweden until 1497. During this period, Sweden was ruled by Regent Sten Sture and the Council of the Realm.

=== Duchies of Schleswig and Holstein ===
Hans had also been proclaimed the future ruler of the duchies of Schleswig and Holstein during Christian I's reign. However, following the birth of his younger brother Frederick in 1471, the terms of the Privilege of Ribe allowed the duchies to elect a duke from among the sons of the late duke. Many nobles in Schleswig and Holstein favored Frederick, but Hans successfully argued that both royal brothers should be elected as co-dukes. Although they were initially meant to govern jointly, the duchies were divided between them in 1490 when Frederick came of age. Feeling disadvantaged with regard to the royal inheritance, Frederick later asserted claims to a share in the kingdoms as well. In response, the Diet at Kalundborg in 1494 rejected Frederick's demands and declared Denmark to be an indivisible elective monarchy.

== Policies ==
Hans's domestic policies were marked by economic support of the Danish merchants and by the widespread use of commoners as officials or even as councillors, something which angered the nobility. The most important of his initiatives was perhaps establishing a permanent Danish navy, one which came to play a role during his later years.

In the meantime, Hans had initially approved to join a crusade plan as presented in Rome on 25 March 1490, in which Nordic soldiers would be part of a coalition of armies fighting the Turks of the Ottoman Empire; however, he sent a legate with a letter to Julius II to explain that he had many conflicts at home, which would prevent him from implementing such endeavor.

The Hanseatic cities were also troubled by a secret war by Danish privateers. In 1494, Ivan had imprisoned all Hanseatic merchants trading in Novgorod. At that time the position of the Hansabund was slowly but steadily declining because of changes in trade routes and the growing opposition against the Hanseatic League in the Northern European naval states.

== Restoration of the Kalmar Union ==
As King Hans sought to assert his authority over Sweden and restore the Kalmar Union, he entered into an alliance with Grand Prince Ivan III of Moscow, aiming to pressure Sweden from the east. The Finnish colonization had expanded in Savo and northern Ostrobothnia over the old borders and Erik Axelsson Tott had founded the Olavinlinna Castle on the Russian side of the border in 1475. Hans promised Ivan that he would restore the Russo-Swedish border to the line stipulated by the 1323 Treaty of Nöteborg. At the same time, tensions between Sten and the Swedish Council of the Realm intensified, particularly over his increasingly autocratic style and conflicts with the church hierarchy. These internal divisions created an opening for Hans.

In 1494, the Swedish and Danish councils met in Nya Lödöse and agreed to implement the 1483 Kalmar Recess. Although Sten Sture resisted, he was pressured into ratifying the agreement. A union summit was subsequently planned for Kalmar in 1495, and King Hans of Denmark arrived in person, expecting to meet with the Swedish Council alongside the Danish and Norwegian councils. On his way from Copenhagen to Kalmar in June 1495, Hans's premier vessel and flagship, the artillery-carrying carvel Gribshunden, exploded and sank at anchor near Ronneby. Hans himself had left the ship prior to the accident, and so was uninjured and able to continue to Kalmar by other means of conveyance. However, Sten repeatedly delayed his appearance by over a month, effectively sabotaging the negotiations. After weeks of fruitless waiting, Hans abandoned the summit in August and returned to Copenhagen.

In 1495, Russian forces attacked Viborg Castle, triggering the Russo-Swedish War of 1495–1497 and diverting Sten Sture's attention to Finland. Under pressure, he led a delayed and indecisive campaign, hampered by winter conditions and internal disputes. Although the immediate threat to Viborg was repelled before his arrival, Sten's cautious strategy and refusal to compensate departing nobles provoked criticism from powerful figures, including Archbishop Jakob Ulvsson. By early 1497, political support for Sten had eroded sharply, and upon returning to Stockholm, he was deposed by the council.

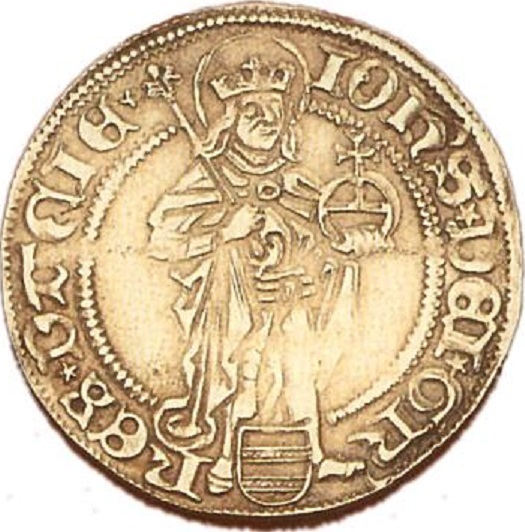
King Hans's gold coin minted in Stockholm in 1497

However, Sten Sture refused to accept the council's decision and hand over his castles. He travelled to Dalarna to rally support. King Hans declared war against him on March 13, and marched on Kalmar, which capitulated without resistance. He then advanced toward Stockholm. On 28 September 1497, Hans's army decisively defeated Sten's peasant levy from Dalarna at the Battle of Rotebro, north of Stockholm. Sten, now isolated and politically outmaneuvered, initiated negotiations. On 6 October, a settlement was reached in Klara Priory, and Sten formally recognized Hans as king and relinquished his regency. Hans entered Stockholm five days later and was crowned King of Sweden. Hans appointed Sten Sture as the seneschal of the realm (rikets hovmästare), and Svante Nilsson as marshal, and confirmed the Kalmar Recess.

A six-year truce between Sweden and Russia had been agreed upon in March 1497 but the border remained disputed. With the Swedish crown now secured, Hans's interest in pursuing the earlier agreement with Ivan diminished. In the spring of 1498, Ivan's envoys arrived in Stockholm to remind Hans of the agreement and request a formal border demarcation, but he responded evasively. Negotiations continued in 1499 and 1500. In a letter to Ivan III, King Hans stated that, according to the Swedish Privy Council, the territories claimed by Russia belonged to Sweden and could not be ceded.

The settlement between Hans and Sten reflected a shared interest in avoiding a drawn-out conflict. While Sten was forced to surrender Västerås Castle and Dalarna, he retained strategically important holdings such as Nyköping, Rekarne, and Svartsjö. In Finland, he was granted the entire Diocese of Turku along with Norrbotten as a lifetime fief, while his wife, Ingeborg Tott, was promised Häme Castle after his death. These favorable terms highlighted Hans's tactical pragmatism: Sten Sture continued to serve as a counterweight to the influence of the high council, while the king avoided placing Finland under direct royal control, instead entrusting the militarily precarious eastern frontier to Sture. The arrangement was also shaped by long-term considerations: Sten Sture, now elderly and without heirs, posed little dynastic threat. The agreement disappointed some of the Swedish council nobility, especially those aligned with Archbishop Jakob Ulvsson, who had hoped for a stricter settlement and a more assertive Danish presence.

== Defeat in Dithmarschen ==
In 1500, King Hans and Duke Frederick launched an attempt to conquer Dithmarschen, a marchland region in what is now Schleswig-Holstein. Although Danish and Holstein rulers had long regarded Dithmarschen as part of their rightful domain, it functioned in practice as an autonomous peasant republic under the nominal overlordship of the Prince-Archbishopric of Bremen. In 1499, the peasants of Dithmarschen refused to accept Danish conditions in a dispute over fishing rights around the island of Heligoland, and King Hans and Duke Frederick decided to use this opportunity to definitively resolve the Dithmarschen question in their favor.

Hans mobilized the nobility from Schleswig and Holstein and hired the so-called "Black Guard", a Landsknecht formation composed largely of ruthless Dutch and East Frisian mercenaries, to support his campaign. Altogether, the army numbered around 12,000 men: approximately 4,000 mercenaries, 2,000 cavalry, 1,000 artillerymen with 4 heavy and at least 23 field guns, and 5,000 foot soldiers. The Dithmarschen forces numbered perhaps 6,000 to 7,000 armed men. They were not professional soldiers but the region had a strong tradition of collective self-defense, and all men were required to perform military service from age 14 until elderly age. Wendish Hanseatic towns supplied Dithmarschen with money, gunpowder, and a small number of mercenaries.

The Danish-led force entered Dithmarschen on February 11, 1500. They captured the lightly defended town of Meldorf without serious resistance. The Black Guard committed atrocities against civilians, which solidified the Dithmarschers' resolve to fight. From Meldorf, King Hans ordered his forces to advance toward Heide along the main road between Hemmingstedt and Wöhrden on February 17. He ignored the advice of his commanders, who warned of poor weather and the risk posed by the marshy terrain. The concerns of the noble cavalry about deep, softened paths and deep side ditches hindering their mobility were disregarded. On the narrow road, the royal army made its way through the marsh towards Hemmingstedt in a 10 km long line.

During the night before the Battle of Hemmingstedt, a small force of Dithmarschen men under the command of Wulf Isebrand constructed a defensive earthwork at Hemmingstedt and opened the coastal dykes, flooding the surrounding marshland. The Dithmarschers' strategy was to refuse battle on the dry and wide areas of the fore-geest and instead fight the enemy in the wet, deep marsh to hinder its speed and deployment capabilities. When the Black Guard attempted to force a passage, they were trapped by the rising waters and overwhelmed by a series of counterattacks by the lightly armed but mobile defenders. The result was a catastrophic defeat for the Danish-led army, which suffered heavy losses and was forced to retreat. In total, the princely army suffered 3,500 to 4,000 dead, while the Dithmarschers' losses were in the hundreds.

The defeat by a peasant republic not only humiliated the Danish monarchy and the allied North German nobility but also exposed the limits of Hans's authority and military judgment. Immediately after the battle, the Dithmarschers widely publicized their victory through Latin and German songs and sayings, which were disseminated by printers in Lübeck, Hamburg, and Cologne. Lübeck was particularly prominent due to its close economic ties with Dithmarschen.

== Rebellion in Sweden and Norway ==
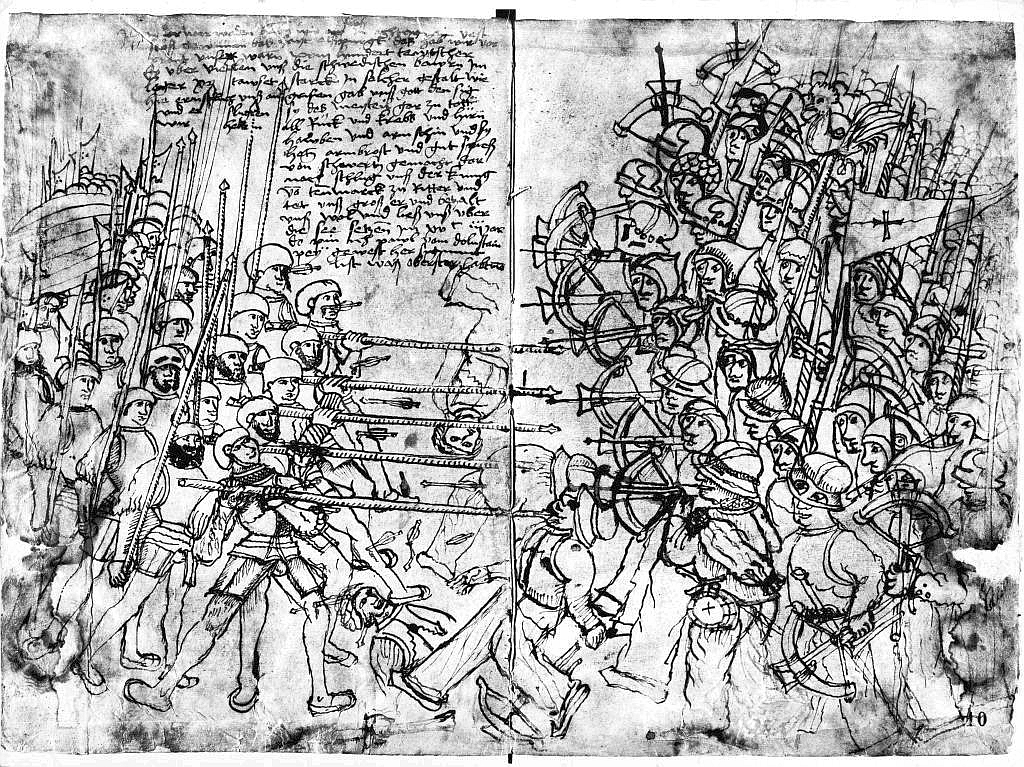
Drawing of a Swedish peasant host fighting German mercenaries

After his initial success in Sweden, Hans felt confident enough to try and strip the Swedish magnates of their power. In June 1499, he deprived Sten Sture the castles of Åbo (Turku) and Viborg (Viipuri), and instead gave him Gästrikland, Tuna in Småland and Vadsbo in Västergötland as fiefs. Similarly, Svante Nilsson had to exchange Örebro Castle to less important Stegeborg, and his requests for compensation for expenses in the Russian war were denied. Hans appointed Danish bailiffs to the castles owned by the crown. These developments led to a cautious rapprochement between Sten Sture and Svante Nilsson in the autumn of 1499. This alliance gained momentum in 1500 after the Danish defeat in the Battle of Hemmingstedt and when Hemming Gadh returned from Rome and began to organize resistance against Hans.

When Hans returned to Sweden in early 1501 after an eighteen-month absence, the Swedish council submitted a protest complaining about use of foreign bailiffs and illegal taxation. Meanwhile, Ivan III had become impatient with the border negotiations with Hans and decided to make their agreement public. Russian envoys arrived with letters providing evidence that Hans had promised to cede parts of eastern Finland to Moscow, and that the Russo-Swedish War of 1495 had been conducted in collusion with him. In August, Sten Sture, Hemming Gadh, and several other members of the Swedish council renounced their allegiance to Hans. He then sailed for Denmark, leaving Queen Christina at Stockholm Castle. The castle was soon besieged by Sten Sture's forces in a siege that lasted for nine months. Suffering from famine and bombardment, the defenders were reduced to just 70 survivors out of an initial garrison of 1,000. Queen Christina surrendered on 5 May 1502 and remained in captivity in Stockholm for eighteen months before being released. The increasingly more bitter war against the Swedes caused friction with both the Danish nobility and the Hanseatic cities, especially Lübeck.

Sten Sture the Elder served as a regent from November 1502 until his death in 1503. In 1504 he was succeeded by Svante Nilsson, whose authority was restricted by the council, which he was required to consult on all major matters. The council decided to send a delegation to Copenhagen, and a meeting was scheduled for Kalmar in 1505. King Hans arrived there with the Norwegian and Danish councils, but the Swedish council failed to appear in time. Rather than wait, Hans had the Norwegian and Danish councils to form a court that awarded him the Swedish crown and convicted the late Sten Sture, Svante Nilsson, and several other Swedish nobles of high treason. In the war that followed, the Swedish rebels were initially successful, capturing the city of Kalmar in 1506. However, in 1507, Hans persuaded the Hanseatic cities to suspend trade with Sweden, forcing the Swedish council to seek a settlement.

After a series of negotiations between 1507 and 1509, Swedish envoys, under pressure from a trade blockade, accepted Hans's harsh terms. According to the treaty, Sweden was to pay an annual tribute of 12,000 marks to Hans, and 1,000 marks to Queen Christina until either Hans or his son, Prince Christian (later King Christian II), was accepted as King of Sweden. However, the treaty was never implemented, and Hans was never allowed into Stockholm as long as he lived. Lübeck soon turned against Denmark, allied with Sweden, and helped break the blockade.

Meanwhile, resistance in Norway was effectively suppressed by Prince Christian, who was the viceroy of Norway from 1506 until he became king in 1513. Between 1510 and 1512, the king waged a final war with both Sweden and Lübeck in which Denmark was at first very pressed but, with the help of the Scottish Barton brothers, partly turned the tables with a naval offensive. The conflict ended with a peace that dealt Lübeck both political and economic setbacks. In early 1513, a summit was scheduled to take place in Copenhagen, where Sweden would have been forced to choose between accepting Hans or his son Christian as king, or agreeing to pay annual tribute. However, Hans died before the meeting could occur.

== Death and legacy ==
Face detail on a wall monument by Claus Berg near King Hans's grave

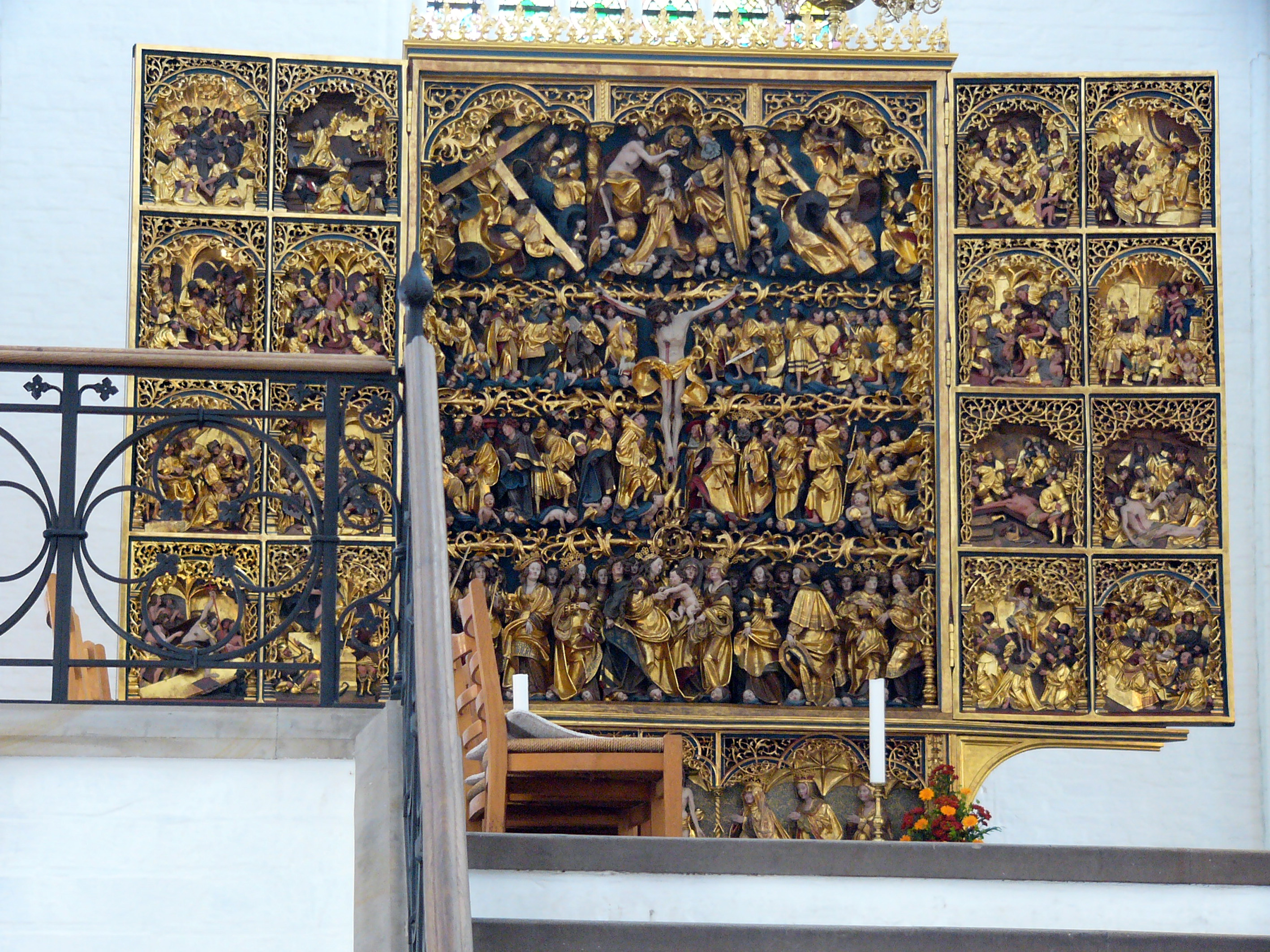
Altarpiece by Claus Berg, now in St. Canute's Cathedral.

In 1513, King Hans died at Aalborghus Castle a short time after being thrown from his horse. He was buried in the church of the Franciscan friary in Odense. Queen Christina, who lived the latter part of her life in a nunnery in Odense, commissioned the famous German sculptor Claus Berg to create a magnificent burial chapel, where both she and her husband were laid to rest after her death in 1521. The late Gothic altarpiece carved by Berg between 1515 and 1525 is one of Denmark's national treasures. Each of the three sections is intricately carved and gilded. It survived the iconoclastic fervour of the Protestant Reformation perhaps because of its connection with the royal burials. The son of King Hans and Queen Christina, King Christian II, with his wife Isabella of Austria, was also interred in the royal family chapel. In 1807, the former Franciscan church was demolished, and Berg's altarpiece and six royal bodies were transferred to St. Canute's Cathedral, also in Odense.

The 32-year-old heir, Christian II of Denmark assumed the throne but was deposed in 1523. Hans's bloodline eventually returned to the Danish and Norwegian thrones in the person of Christian IV of Denmark, the great-great-grandson of his daughter, Electress Elisabeth.

In his own age, and partly to posterity, Hans has often appeared a "commoner's king", a jolly and plain man with a folksy manner. Behind the surface, however, he seems to have been a hard realist and a zealous political calculator. In many ways he is a Scandinavian parallel of Louis XI of France and Henry VII of England.

== Full title ==
Hans's full title as King of Denmark, Sweden, and Norway was: King of Denmark, Sweden, Norway, the Wends and the Goths, Duke of Schleswig, Holstein, Stormarn and Dithmarschen, Count of Oldenburg and Delmenhorst

== Issue ==
In 1478, Hans married Christina of Saxony, daughter of Elector Ernst of Saxony and Elisabeth of Bavaria. During the last decade of Hans's life, he had a relationship with Edele Jernskjæg (died 1512). After Christina was released from the Swedish captivity in 1503, she undertook a pilgrimage and then settled permanently at Næsbyhoved Castle near Odense, living separately from Hans. Christina died in 1521.

The Danish genealogical tradition mentions five children of Hans and Christina:

Name	Birth	Death	Notes
Hans	1479	1480	died as a child
Ernst	1480	1480	died as a child
Christian II	1 July 1481	25 January 1559	King of Denmark, Norway and Sweden. Had issue.
Elizabeth	24 June 1485	10 June 1555	Married Joachim I Nestor, Elector of Brandenburg in 1502. Had issue.
Francis	15 July 1497	1 April 1511	

The Oldenburgisch Chronicon from 1599 cites sources that mention an additional son named Jacob. Jørgen Nybo Rasmussen has argued that he was Jacobus de Dacia (1484–1566), a Franciscan friar who served as a missionary in Mexico.

== See also ==
- List of Danish monarchs
- List of Norwegian monarchs
- List of Swedish monarchs
- Danish monarch's family tree

== Bibliography ==
- Heise, Arnold (1892). "Hans". Dansk biografisk Lexikon. Vol. 6 (1st ed.) – via Project Runeberg.
- Møller Jensen, Janus (2007). Denmark and the Crusades, 1400-1650. BRILL. ISBN 9789047419846.
- Scocozza, Benito (1997). "Hans". Politikens bog om danske monarker [Politiken's book about Danish monarchs] (in Danish). Copenhagen: Politikens Forlag. pp. 99–101. ISBN 87-567-5772-7.
- Helle, Knut, ed. (2003-09-04). The Cambridge History of Scandinavia. Cambridge, UK; New York: Cambridge University Press. ISBN 978-0-521-47299-9.
- Allmand, Christopher, ed. (2015-05-21). The New Cambridge Medieval History: Volume 7, c.1415-c.1500. Cambridge: Cambridge University Press. pp. 693–702. ISBN 978-1-107-46076-8.

Hans, King of Denmark House of Oldenburg Born: 2 February 1455 Died: 22 July 1513
Regnal titles
Preceded by Christian I	Duke of Holstein and Schleswig; 1482–1513 with Frederick I (1482–1513)	Succeeded by Frederick I and Christian II
Preceded by Christian I	King of Denmark; 1481–1513	Succeeded by Christian II
Vacant Title last held by Christian I	King of Norway; 1483–1513	Succeeded by Christian II
Vacant Title last held by Charles VIII	King of Sweden; 1497–1501	Vacant Title next held by Christian II
