= Dano-Swedish War (1501–1512) =

Military conflict

Danish–Swedish–Hanseatic War
- Part of a series of Dano-Swedish Wars and the Danish-Hanseatic Rivalry
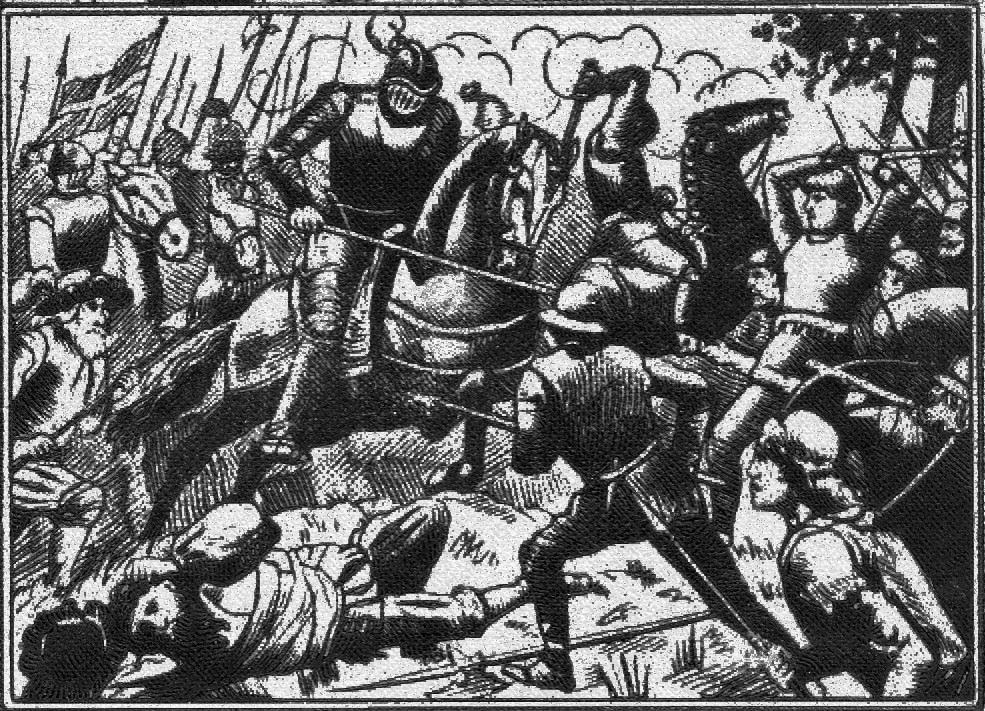
- Svante Sture's War with Denmark (Swedish imagination of 1888)
Date	1501–1512
Location	Scandinavia
Result	Treaty of Malmö
Territorial changes	Status quo ante bellum

Belligerents
Sweden; Norwegian rebels (1501–1504); Free City of Lübeck (1509–12)	Kalmar Union; Denmark; Norway

Commanders and leaders
Sten Sture # Svante Sture; Hemming Gadh; Knut Alvsson X Nils Ravaldsson (WIA)	King Hans; Queen Christina; Prince Christian; Søren Norby; Henrich Krummedige; Earl of Arran

The Dano-Swedish War from 1501 to 1512 was a military conflict between Denmark and Sweden within the Kalmar Union.

The war began with a Swedish and a Norwegian revolt against King Hans and the siege of Queen Christina in her castle in Danish-held Stockholm.

== 1501 to 1504 ==
On 1 January 1501, Swedish Regent Sten Sture the Elder and the Swedish National Council met in Vadstena Castle, at which the council approved the revolt against King Hans, and declared the deposition of the king. Norwegian nobel Knut Alvsson was also there and directed harsh accusations against King Hans' control in Norway and was provided Swedish support for his return to Norway. Sten Sture besieged Tre Kronor Castle in Stockholm from September 1501 until 6 May 1502. The kings wife, Queen Christina was the commander of the castle. This was one of the hardest sieges known during the Kalmar Union, during which a garrison of 1000 men was reduced to 70 out of plague and starvation. In August 1501 a Swedish army took Örebro.

Knut Alvsson led at the same time Swedish forces in an attack on Båhus Fortress on the Swedish-Norwegian border. The fort was commanded by Henrich Krummedige. Krummedige was able to hold Båhus, but Alvsson captured Akershus Fortress and Tønsberg Fortress in March 1502.

King Hans dispatched his son Christian (later crowned King Christian II of Denmark and Norway) at the head of Danish forces; they relieved the siege of Båhus Fortress, and also captured Älvsborg Fortress across the river from Båhus Fortress. Krummedige then led forces north to finish off the rebellion by recapturing Tønsberg Fortress and investing Akershus Fortress, which Alvsson was defending.

When it became clear that the rebellion was stalemated, Alvsson came on board one of Krummedige's ships under a safe conduct. Krummedige's men killed Alvsson on 18 August 1502, either by treachery or, as alleged by Krummedige's men, in response to Alvsson's own violence. Breaking the rules of safe conduct was considered a grave treachery after the old Norse laws, which were still used in Norway at the time. However, the court in Oslo deemed Krummedige to have acted justly. The conditions for this judgement have been discussed by historians for years. Sten Sture invaded Norway in 1503, but failed to accomplish anything of importance. Nils Ravaldsson became the new leader of the rebellion, but it was crushed in December 1504, at Olsborg Castle.

== 1504 to 1509 ==
14 December 1503, Sten Sture died, and in 1504, Svante Nilsson became the new Regent of Sweden. The war continued, and the Danes and Swedes fought over the Danish-held city of Kalmar. It was also fighting in the border areas of Skåne, Halland and Blekinge. In 1507, King Hans of Denmark ordered his navy to attack Swedish coastal areas. In July 1507, the Danish-Norwegian navy under the command of Søren Norby attacked Kastelholm Castle at Åland and burned it down. Later the same year, Dano-Norwegian military forces under the command of Henrich Krummedige attacked Nya Lödöse and burned the city down. In February 1508, Swedish military forces attacked the Danish town Væ and burned it down. In 1509, Sweden agreed to a declaration which recognised Hans as king of Sweden in principle, but he was never allowed into Stockholm as long as he lived, nor crowned king of Sweden anew, and the war renewed shortly after.

== 1509 to 1512 ==
Fighting intensified in 1509 and 1510 when the German city of Lübeck and the Hanseatic League helped Sweden to conquer Danish-held Kalmar and Borgholm. The recently established Danish-Norwegian Navy fought joint Hanseatic-Swedish naval forces at Nakskov and Bornholm in 1510 and 1511. In April 1512, a peace agreement was signed in Malmö.

=== Sack of Turku ===
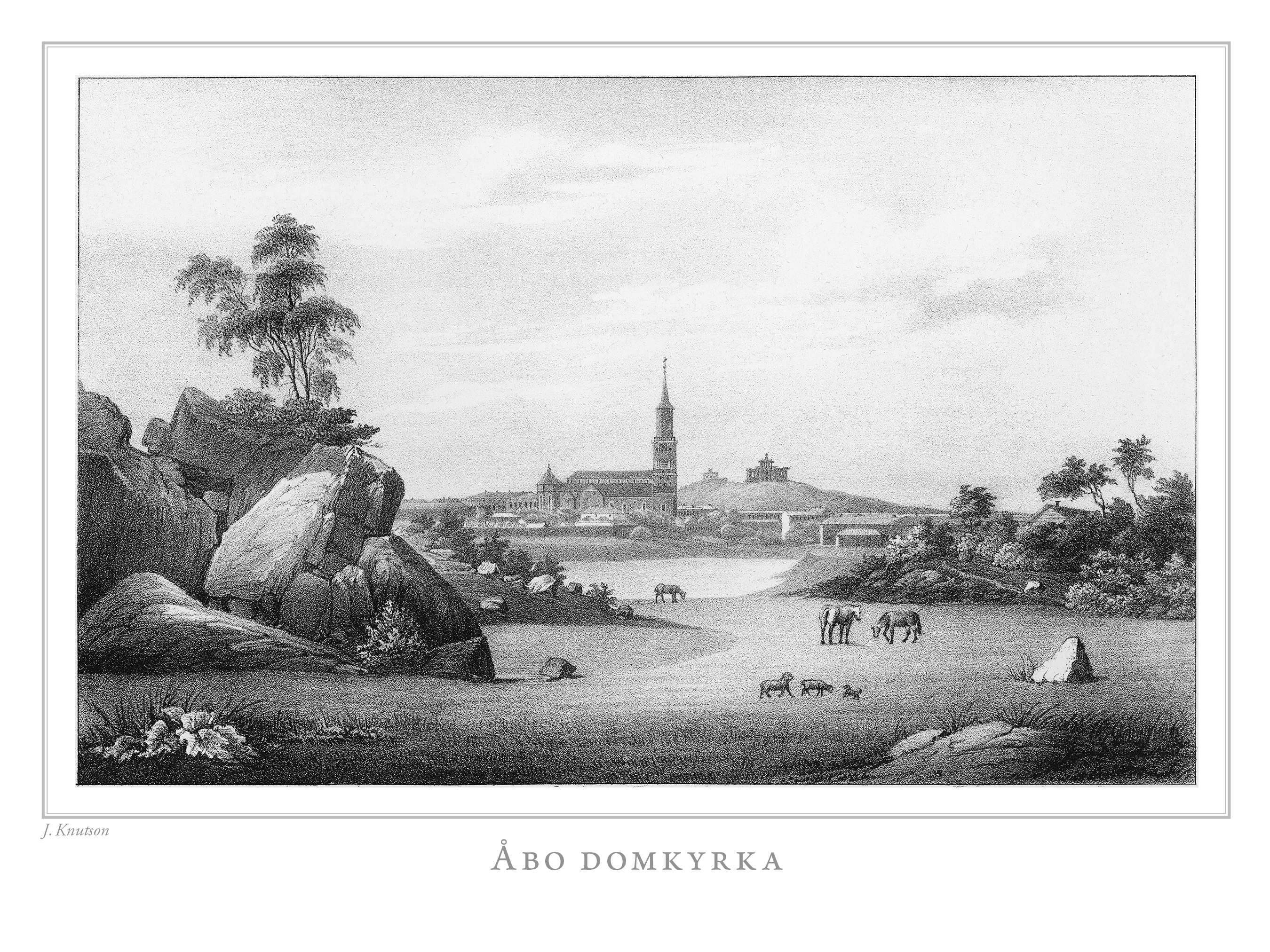
Lithography of Turku Cathedral by Johan Knutson

The Sack of Turku occurred from 2–7 August 1509. A Danish force under the command of Otto Ruud snuck past Åbo's (Turku's) defenses at night, after which the Danes landed on the shore and spread out into the city. They would kill anyone they encountered, also plundering the cathedral, taking many valuables after which they departed on 7 August. In his report to Sten Sture the Younger on 16 August, Bishop Johannes Olavi writes about how the Danes caused "immense and irreparable damage" during their attack on the cathedral.

On 2–3 August, the Danish forces under the command of Otto Ruud (spelled Otto Ruuth in the chronicle) snuck past the castle guards unnoticed while everyone else was asleep and sailed up the Aura River, eventually reaching Åbo. They spread out through the city, and eventually with a "horrible noise and with a terrible sound of drums and piercing trumpets" woke everyone up, in order to induce panic according to Bishop Juusten's chronicle. Once inside, they plundered the town, and killed the people inside and anyone who resisted, along with the more important people there. They most likely attacked the town's cathedral first, stealing the bishop's mitre, crosier, as well as books, copper, tin, iron, and items of all kinds. It is also probable that Ruud, along with elite troops, took the task of taking the richest treasure chamber. The Danes also kidnapped several of the residents, taking them back to Copenhagen. Otto Ruud would also stay in Åbo until Tuesday, taking more of the town's goods and putting them on his ships. The ornaments on the cathedral were also taken. Despite the chronicle's young age in comparison to the event, the main details have been confirmed by contemporary sources.

In a letter to regent Sten Sture the Younger on 16 August of the same year, Johannes Olavi spoke of the Danes' actions in the cathedral. He claimed that they had done "immense and irreparable damage" by stealing chalices holy images, his staff, along with other church possessions.

== Aftermath ==
The war did not end the fighting between the kingdoms of the Kalmar Union, the result concerning Sweden was status quo, and a new war between the Kalmar Union and Sweden erupted in 1517, but Lübeck suffered a real political and economic setback by the peace. Norwegian attempts at opposition against Denmark were strangled by King Hans's son Prince Christian (afterward King Christian II), who was the viceroy of Norway from 1506 until he became king of Denmark and Norway in 1513.

== Literature ==
- George Childs Kohn (Hrsg.): Dictionary of Wars, page 142f. Routledge 2013
- Hanno Brand (ed.): Trade, Diplomacy and Cultural Exchange – Continuity and Change in the North Sea Area and the Baltic 1350–1750, page 115ff. Uitgeverij Verloren, Hilversum 2005
- Franklin Daniel Scott: Sweden, the Nation's History, page 99ff. SIU Press, 1988

== Bibliography ==
- Rinne, Juhani [in Finnish] (1976). Turun Tuomiokirkon 'Ejbyn Kalkki' ja Sen Henkilöhistoriallinen Probleema [The 'Ejbyn Chalice' of Turku Cathedral and Its Biographical Problem] (PDF) (in Finnish). Turun Historiallinen Yhdistys.
- Lamberg, Marko (2023). "The Sack of Turku in 1509: Recovering from a Catastrophe" (PDF). Zapiski Historyczne (2). Towarzystwo Naukowe w Toruniu: 97. doi:10.15762/ZH.2023.14. ISSN 0044-1791.
- Sundberg, Ulf (2010). Sveriges krig 1448-1630 [Sweden's wars 1448-1630] (in Swedish). Svenskt militärhistoriskt bibliotek. ISBN 9789185789627.
