= Christina of Saxony =

Queen of Denmark, Norway, and Sweden (1461–1521)

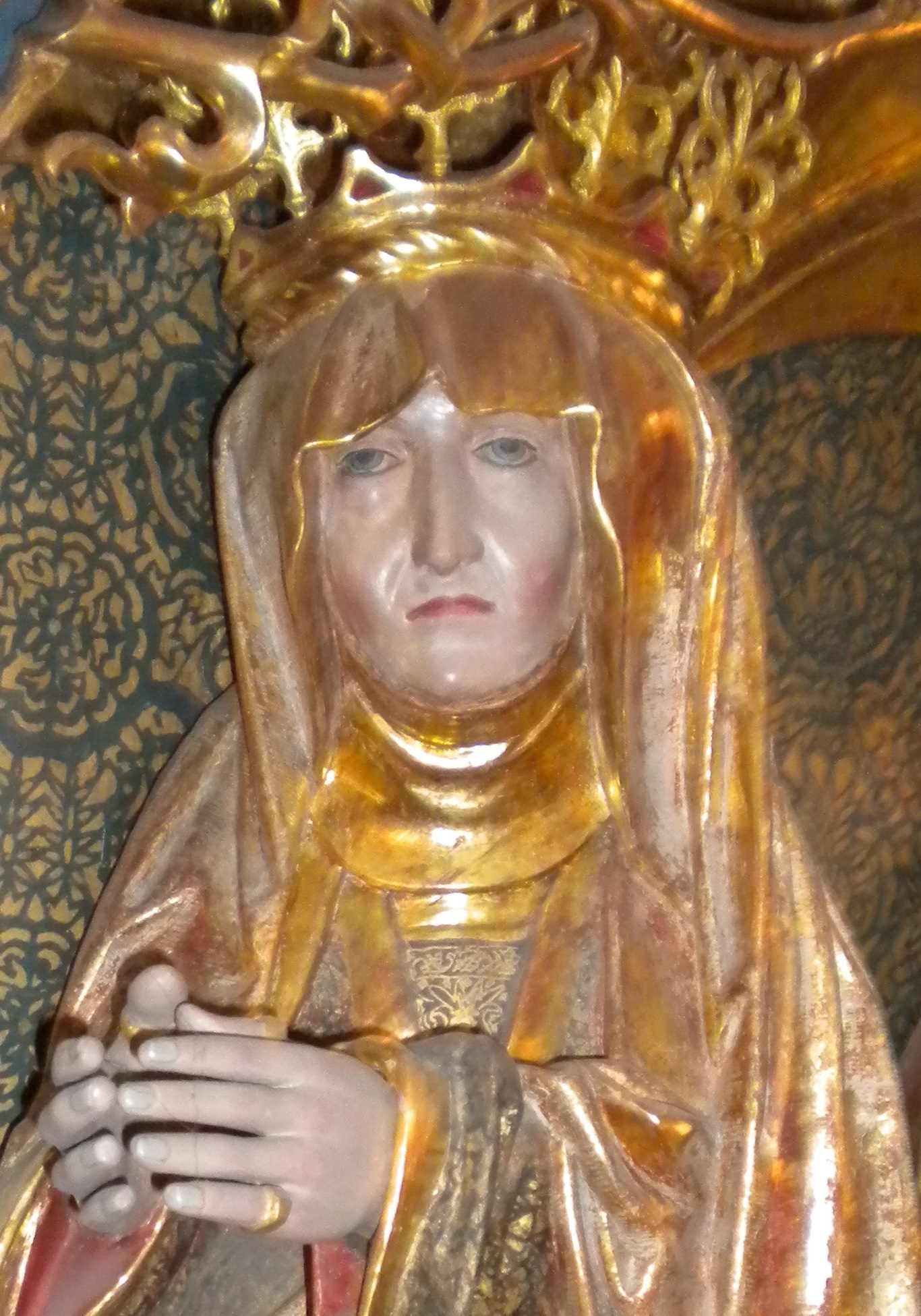
- Sculpture of Christina from the altarpiece by Claus Berg in St. Canute's Cathedral, c. 1530

Queen consort of Denmark
- Tenure: 21 May 1481 – 20 February 1513
- Coronation: 18 May 1483; Copenhagen Cathedral

Queen consort of Norway
- Tenure: 1483 – 20 February 1513

Queen consort of Sweden
- Tenure: 6 October 1497 – August 1501
- Coronation: 4 February 1499
- Born: 25 December 1461; Torgau, Saxony
- Died: 8 December 1521 (aged 59); Odense, Denmark
- Burial: St. Canute's Cathedral, Odense (from 1807)
- Spouse: John, King of Denmark (m. 1478; died 1513)
- Issue among others: Christian II, King of Denmark; Elizabeth, Electress of Brandenburg; Francis
- House: Wettin
- Father: Ernst, Elector of Saxony
- Mother: Elisabeth of Bavaria

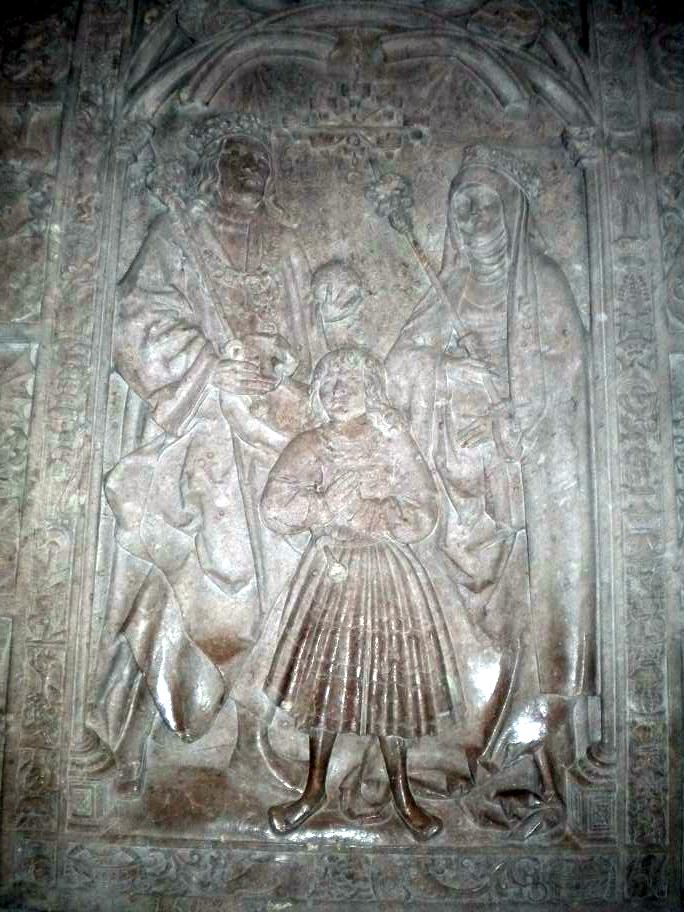
Wall sculpture depicting Queen Christina together with her husband King John II and their son Francis

Christina of Saxony (25 December 1461 – 8 December 1521) was Queen of Denmark, Norway and Sweden as the wife of King John.

== Life ==
=== Early life ===
Christina was engaged to John, King of Denmark, Norway and Sweden, in 1477. The year after, she traveled from Saxony to Warnemunde, where she was met by a Danish retinue who brought her Copenhagen Castle, where she was married to John on 6 September 1478. The wedding is described as magnificent, with possessions of a knights and the bride, dressed in gold embroidered red, travelling in a carriage of gold.

In 1481, she became queen of Denmark. She was however not crowned until 1483, when John had become king of Norway also. On 18 May 1483, she and John were crowned king and queen of Denmark in the Frue Kirke in Copenhagen.

During the first twenty years of her marriage, there is not much information about Christina, and she seems to have lived a life devoted to her family. She was the mother of Christian II, Franciscus, Knud and Elizabeth, who later married Joachim I Nestor, Elector of Brandenburg, and (probably) also of Jacob the Dacian. The royal couple did not live much in Copenhagen, but preferred to travel between the royal castles in Funen, as Nykobing Castle was reportedly the favorite residence of Christina. There is nothing to indicate that she ever involved herself in politics during her life in Denmark as its queen.

Christina is described as pious, and was said to weep every time she was unable to attend mass. In 1497, she and John founded the St. Clare's Monastery, Copenhagen.

=== Sweden ===
In 1497, John was elected king of Sweden. Two years later, Christina followed him to Sweden, and on 4 February 1499, they were crowned king and queen of Sweden in Uppsala. She accompanied John on his second visit to Sweden in 1500, and his third in January 1501. During the 1501 visit, John entered into his love affair with one of her ladies-in-waiting, Edel Jernskjæg, which attracted a scandal and caused a de facto termination of her marriage.

The stay in the Swedish capital was dominated by the king's suspicions toward the Swedes, who were known to be hostile to the Kalmar Union; when the queen announced that she intended to attend mass at the Storkyrkan in the city, the king refused to allow her until she begged him crying, and when the queen and her ladies-in-waiting were observed to return with a crowd of Swedes, the king's guards aimed fire at them in the belief that they had taken the queen hostage, when in fact they had just wished to escort her back to the castle as a way of honoring her.

When the War of Deposition against King Hans and Dano-Swedish War (1501–1512) took place later that same year, John left Sweden for Denmark in August 1501 in the company of Edel Jernskjæg. He left Christina, who was at that time too ill to travel, in charge of the garrison of the Castle of Tre Kronor in Stockholm as regent and as moral support for his followers.

From September 1501 until 6 May 1502, Queen Christina was besieged by the Swedish rebels. This was one of the hardest sieges known during the Kalmar Union, during which a garrison of 1,000 men was reduced to 70 out of plague and starvation.

On 9 May 1502, Queen Christina surrendered to the Swedish regent Sten Sture the Elder. According to the peace settlement, was to be kept at a convent in Stockholm until she could travel back to Denmark. When she surrendered her position, she turned herself over to lady Ingeborg Tott, who met her at the castle and followed her to a convent.

She was kept first at the Dominican friary (Blackfriars) in Stockholm and then at the Franciscan friary (Greyfriars), also in Stockholm. However, the treaty was broken by Sten Sture: when John had a ship sent to Stockholm to collect her, the regent had her taken from Stockholm to Vadstena Abbey in a form of captivity. In October 1503, she was finally released and escorted to the Danish border by Sten Sture, where she was met by her son Christian in Halmstad.

=== Later life ===
In 1504, she made a pilgrimage to Wilsnack and Sternberg in Brandenburg, where she also met her daughter Elizabeth. Upon her return to Denmark, she founded convents for Poor Clares in Copenhagen and Odense.

From her return to Denmark after her release onward, Queen Christina lived the rest of her life separated from King John. She had her own separate court, headed by Anne Meinstrup, and resided on her dower lands at Næsbyhoved Slot and in Odense with her son Frans. She hosted a grand court with many guests, but the visits from the king was almost non-existent.

Christina was interested in art and music and acted as the benefactor of musicians, writers and painters. She commissioned the famous altar piece of Claus Berg, who depicted the royal Danish family and was placed in the Odense cathedral, as well as the literary work of the priest Michael of Odense. She was a critical Catholic, who wished for a reformation of the Catholic church, and the benefactor of the order of Saint Clare and Saint Francis, and supported Laurids Brandsen, who worked to reform the discipline of the Danish convents. She was also known for her philanthropy.

In 1513, she was widowed.

Christina of Saxony died on 8 December 1521, aged 59.

== Issue ==
Christina and John had five or six children:

Name	Birth	Death	Notes
Hans	1479	1480	died as a child
Ernst	1480	1480	died as a child
Christian II	1 July 1481	25 January 1559	King of Denmark, Norway and Sweden. Had issue.
Jacob	1484	1566	Disputed; Possibly identical to Jacob the Dacian
Elizabeth	24 June 1485	10 June 1555	Married Joachim I Nestor, Elector of Brandenburg in 1502. Had issue.
Francis	15 July 1497	1 April 1511	

Christina of Saxony House of Wettin Born: 25 December 1461 Died: 8 December 1521
Royal titles
Preceded by Dorothea of Brandenburg	Queen consort of Denmark; 1481–1513	Vacant Title next held by Isabella of Austria
Vacant Title last held by Dorothea of Brandenburg	Queen consort of Norway; 1483–1513	Vacant Title next held by Isabella of Austria
Vacant Title last held by Christina Abrahamsdotter	Queen consort of Sweden; 1497–1501	Vacant Title next held by Isabella of Austria
