= Claus Berg =

German sculptor and painter (c. 1470 – c. 1532)

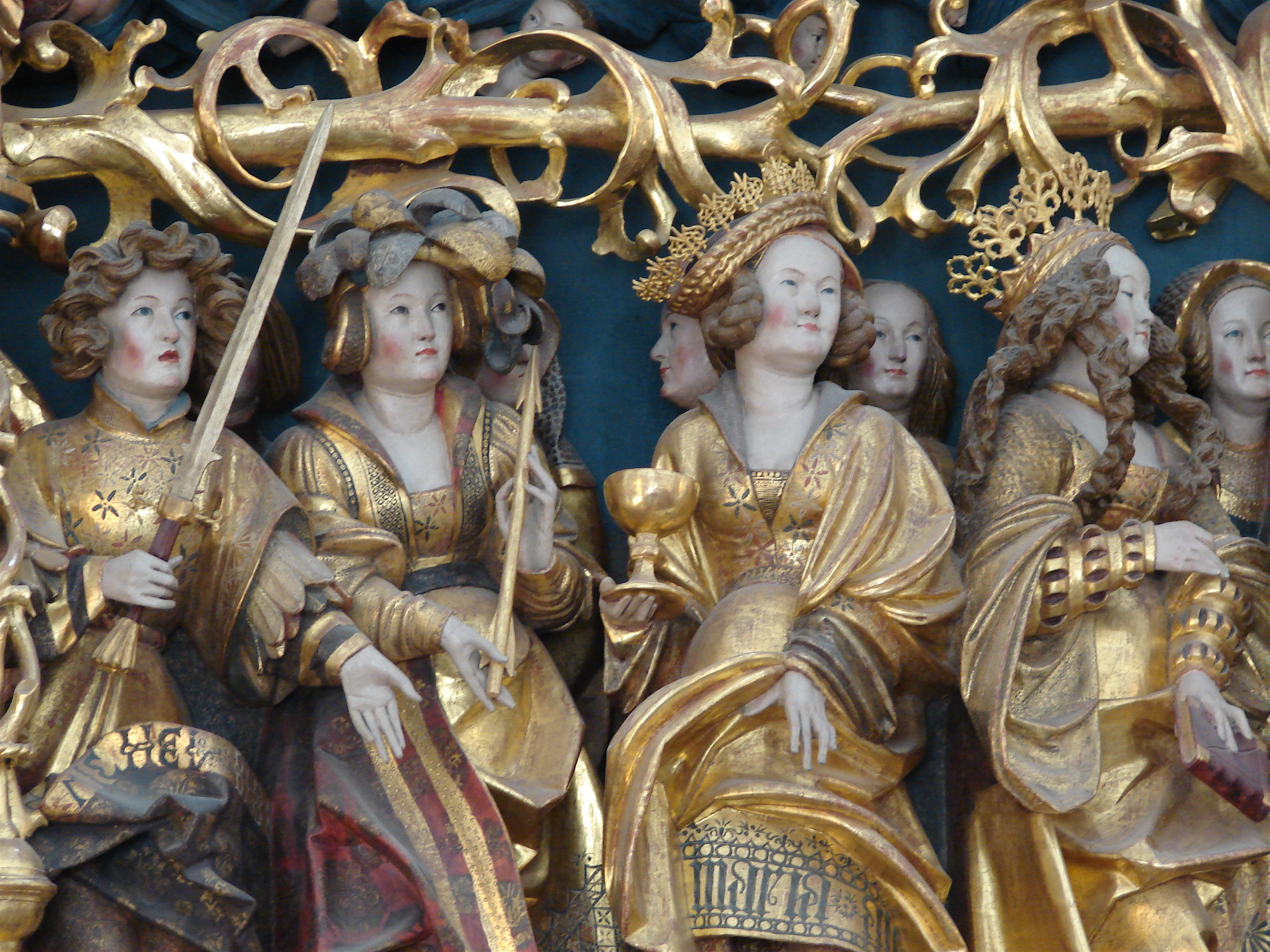
Claus Berg: Altarpiece in Odense Cathedral (detail)

Claus Berg (c. 1470 – c. 1532) was a German sculptor and painter who is remembered for his workshop in Odense and his decorative work in Danish churches, especially altarpieces and crucifixes. His finest work, the altarpiece which now stands in Odense Cathedral, was designed at the request of Queen Christine for the Franciscan abbey church of Gråbrødre (Gråbrødre Klosterkirke) which she had chosen as the burial site for her husband King Hans and herself.

== Biography ==
Born in Lübeck in the north of Germany, Berg possibly first worked as a sculptor in Veit Stoss's workshop in Nuremberg. He was invited to Denmark by Queen Christine, arriving in about 1504 to head the workshop in Odense, one of the most important in Europe at the time, where he coordinated the work of his 12 assistants until 1532. The queen took great care of him, giving him Apostelgården, a nearby farm, as a home and, by some accounts, providing him with the company of one of her maids as a wife. In 1507, he is mentioned as a citizen of Odense and in 1508 and 1510 as a painter in the queen's accounts. The decorated choir in Odense's Gråbrødre Church, especially the altarpiece which can now be seen in Odense Cathedral, is the only work which can be directly attributed to Berg. It appears to have been undertaken at the request of the queen who wished to prepare the Gråbrødre Church, which has since been demolished, as the burial site for her husband and herself. Other works have been ascribed to him on the basis of their style, for example the altarpiece in Sanderum.

Berg's son, Frants Berg (1504–1591), whose godmother was Queen Christine, became a priest at St. Nikolaj Church in Copenhagen and later Bishop of Oslo.

== Works ==
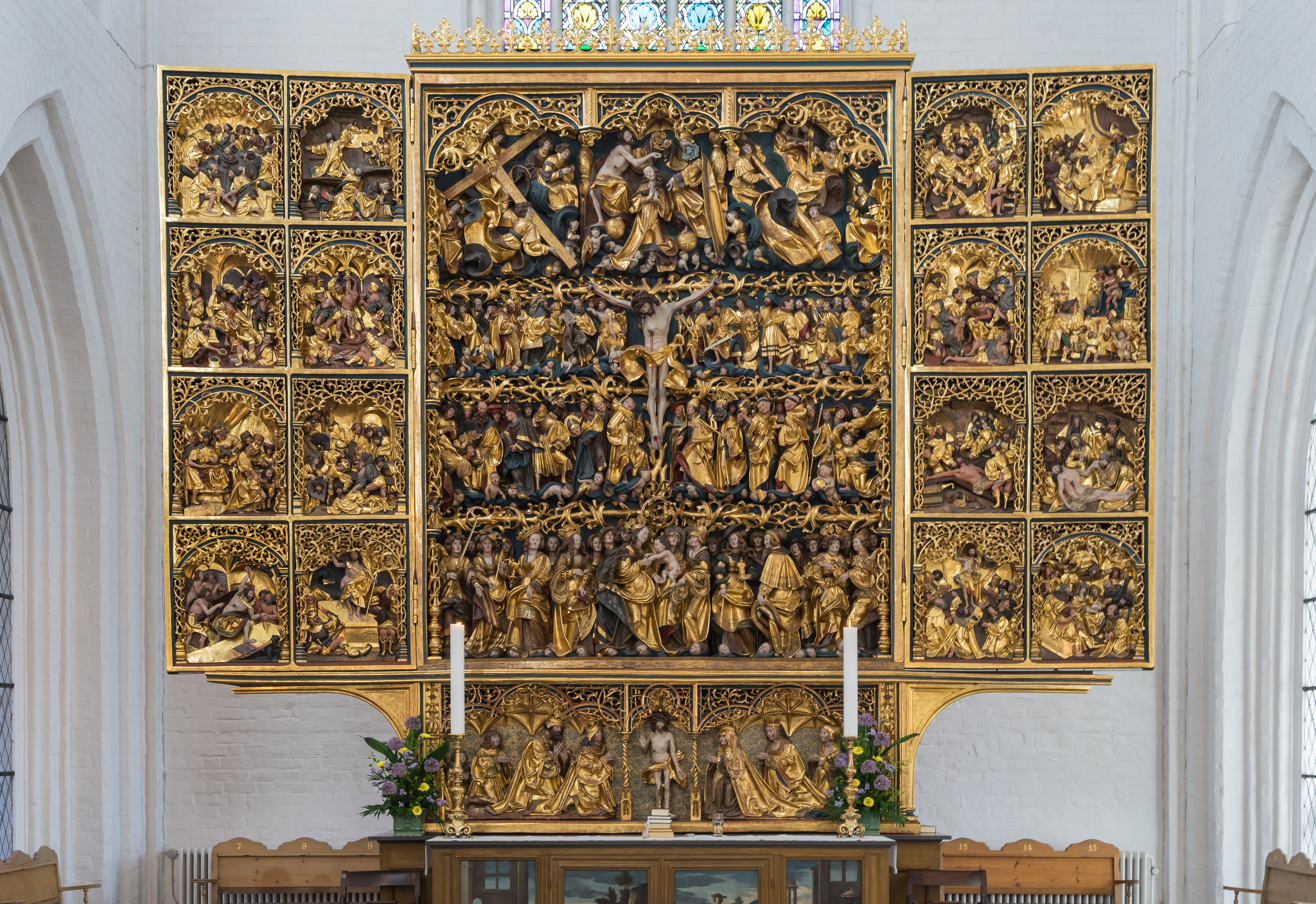
Claus Berg: Altarpiece in Odense Cathedral

The altarpiece from Gråbrødre Church, now in Odense Cathedral, was probably completed after the death of Queen Catherine in 1521. Standing 3.75 metres high, the carved oak triptych depicts the traditional, if unusually interconnected, themes of the crucifixion, the passion and the crowning of Mary. The central section shows the crucified Jesus on the tree of life surrounded by apostles, Biblical and historical figures, with Francis of Assisi at his feet. Above, Mary is crowned queen of heaven surrounded by sparkling angels. Below, Saint Anne is shown with the infant Jesus and his mother Mary. The side wings present the Passion, from the Last Supper to the Ascension with the apostles at Pentecost at the bottom right. The base shows members of the royal family including King Christian II, King Hans and his wife Queen Christine, now dressed as a widow. The style indicates connections with southern German art, characterized by the realistic, plastic look of the figures, probably inspired by Albrecht Dürer from Nuremberg. Restoration work in 1973-86 showed how the altarpiece consisted of a basic carved skeleton which was then gilded and painted. Some 90 per cent of the original work was preserved under several layers of subsequent coating.

Other works ascribed to Berg include the altarpieces in Bregninge Church on Ærø, in Sanderum Church near Odense and in the Church of Our Lady in Aarhus and crucifixes in Asperup Church and Vindinge Church on Funen and in Sorø Church (1527). Berg's workshop also produced limestone reliefs as well as tombstones for King Hans in Odense Cathedral (originally in Gråbrødre Church) and for Bishop Ivan Munk in Ribe Cathedral.

In Germany, works ascribed to Berg include the Madonna (1500) in Lübeck's St. Annen Museum and the apostle figures in Güstrow Cathedral (ca. 1530).

== Gallery with the famous Apostle figures of the Güstrow Cathedral ==
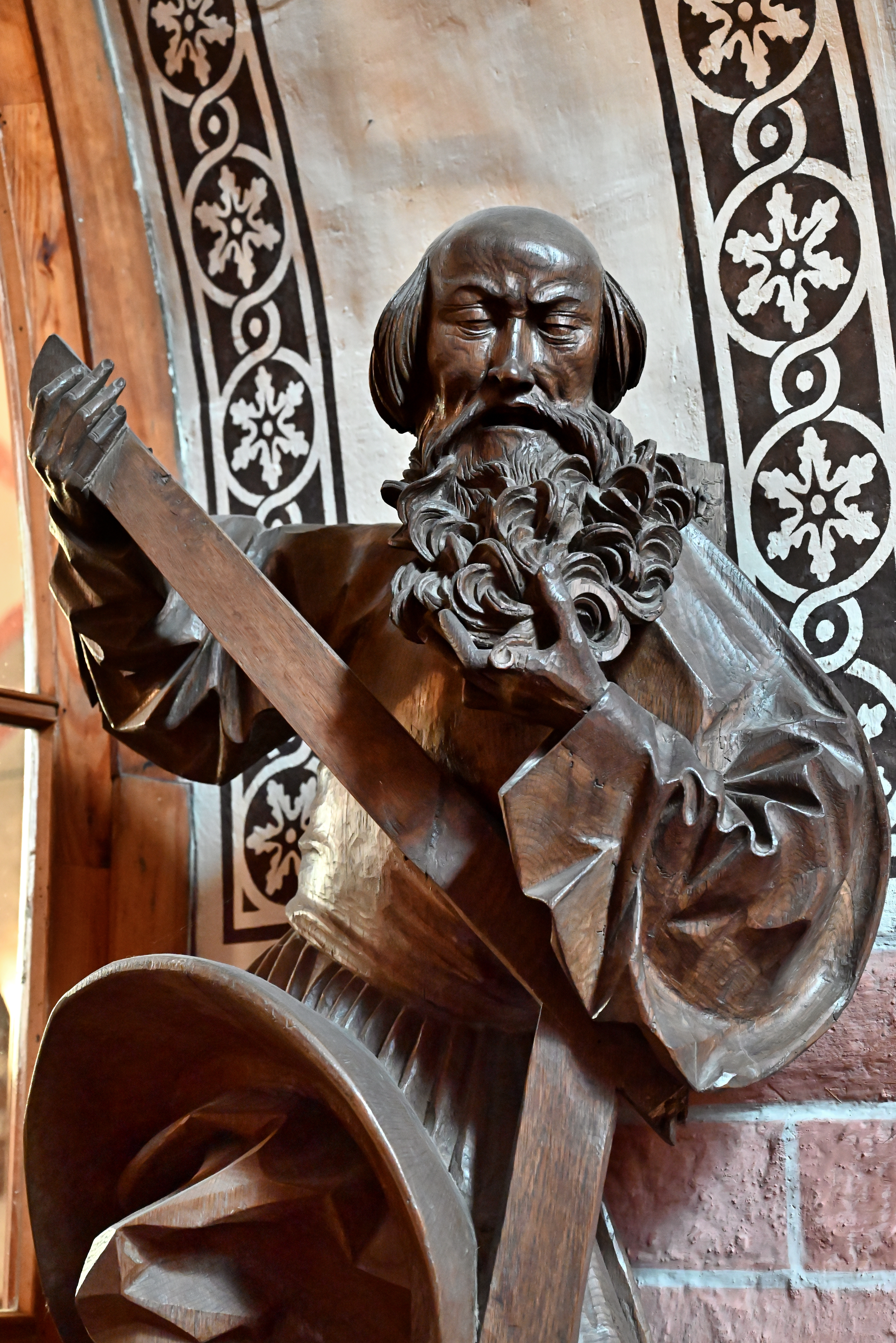
Andreas with the cross

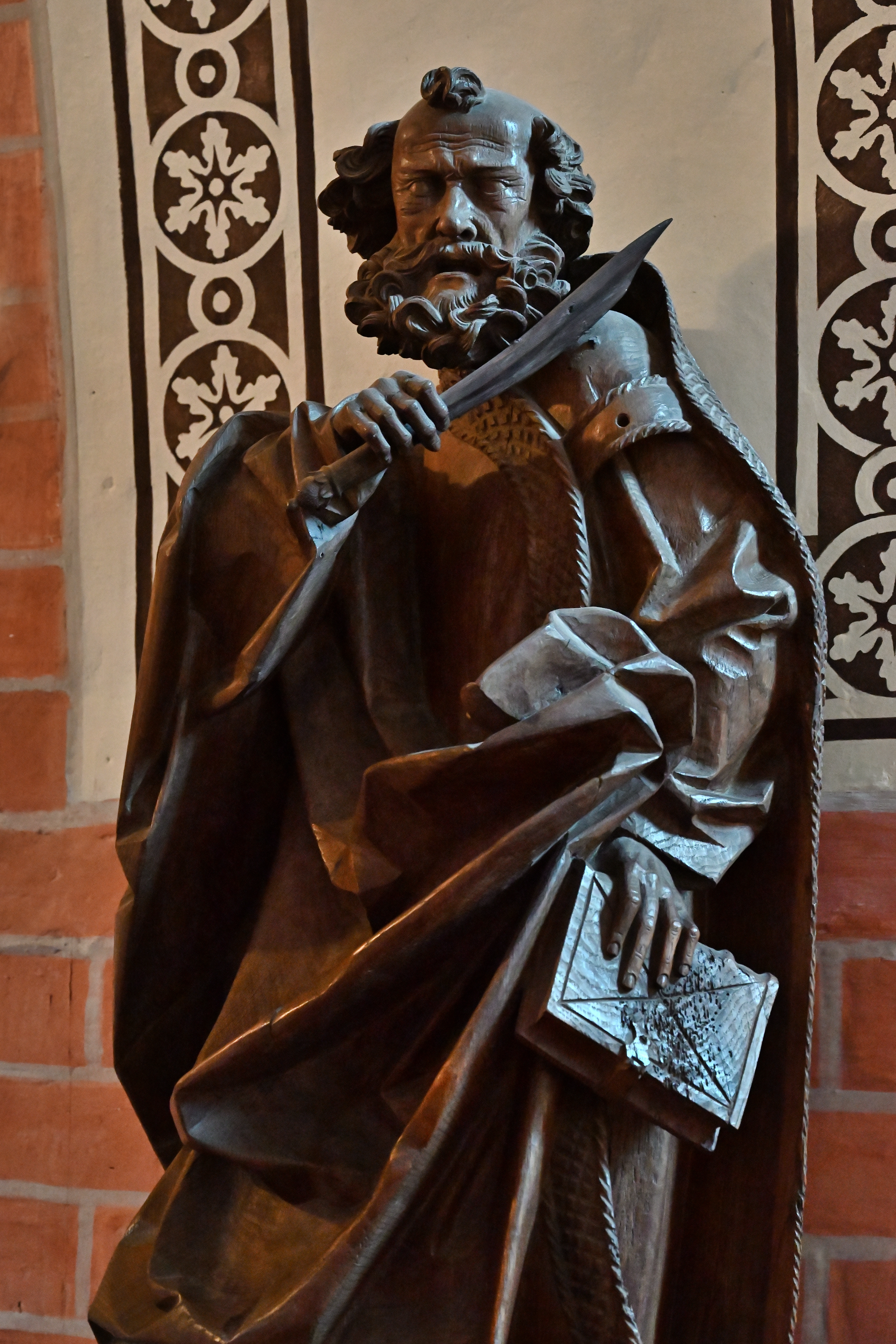
Bartholomäus with the knife

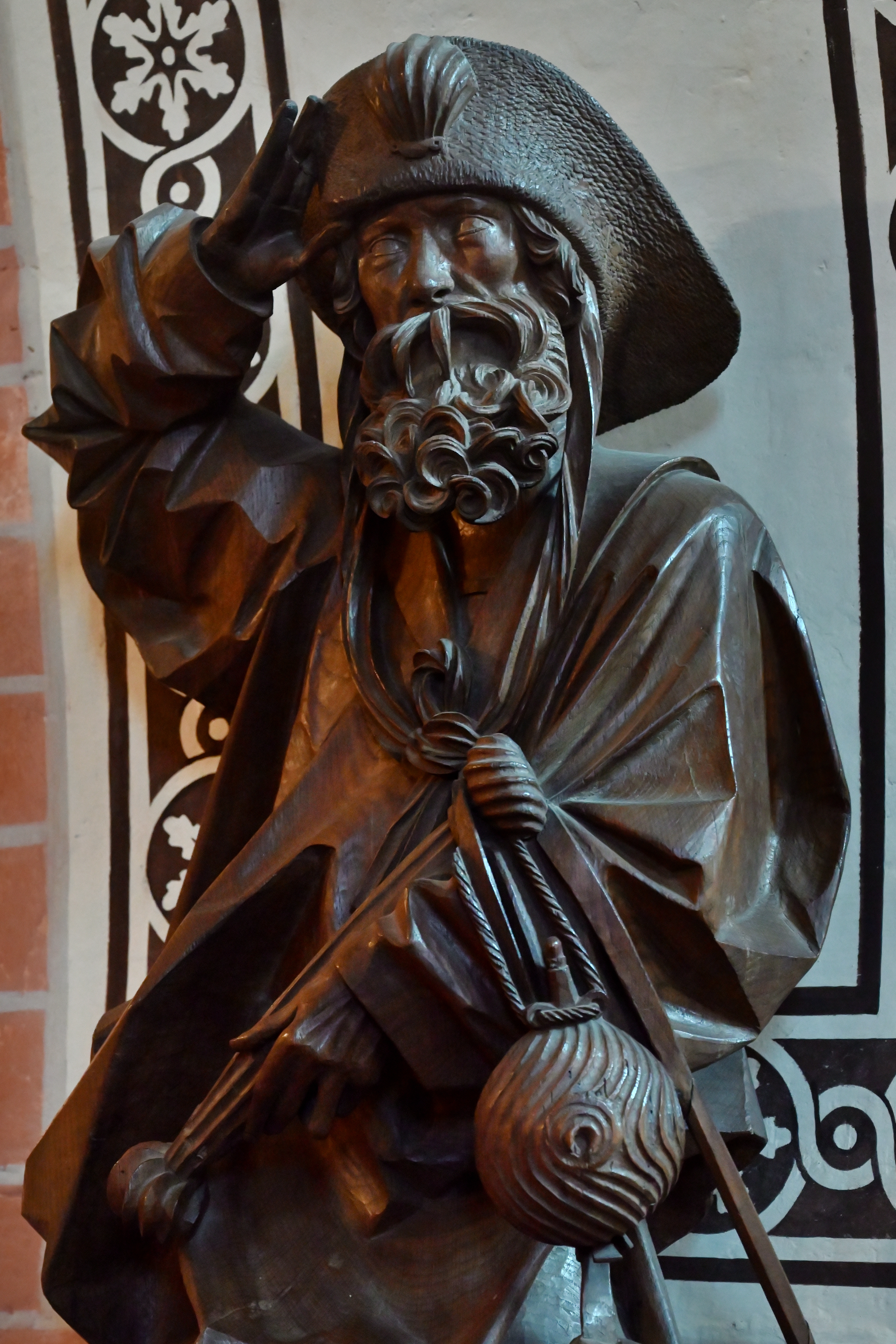
Jakobus the older one with the pilgrim's hat

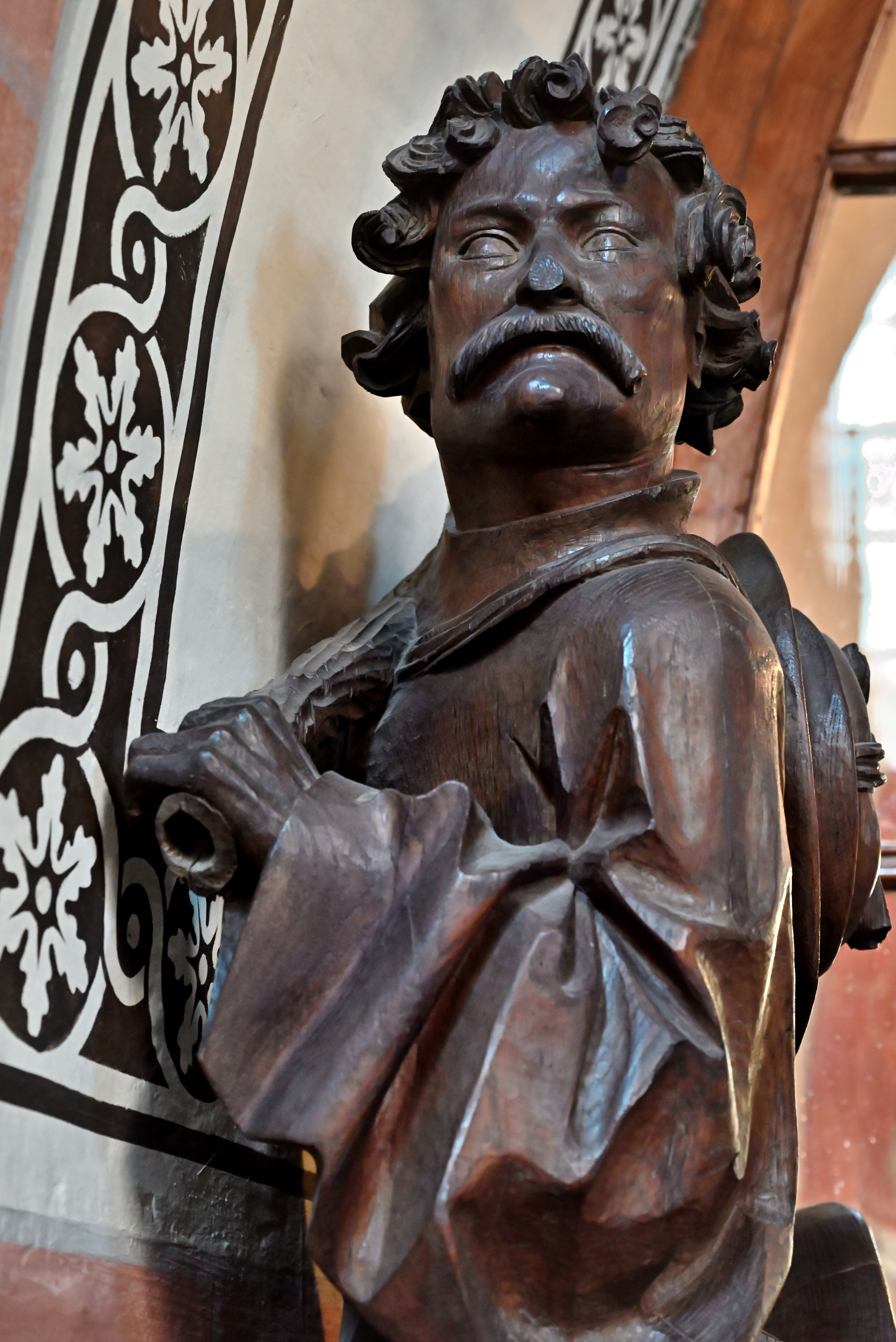
Jakobus the younger one with the walker

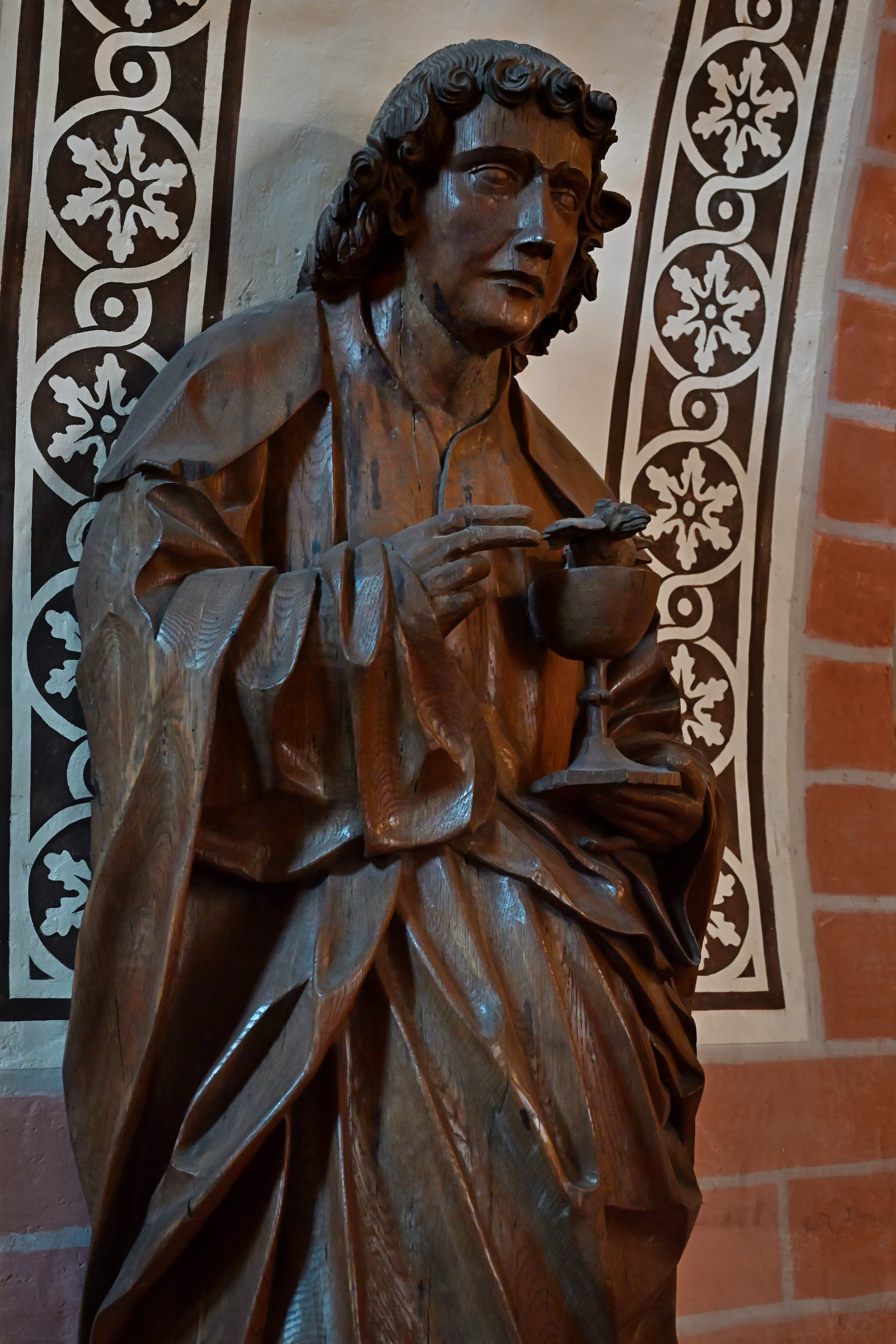
Johannes with the poison chalice

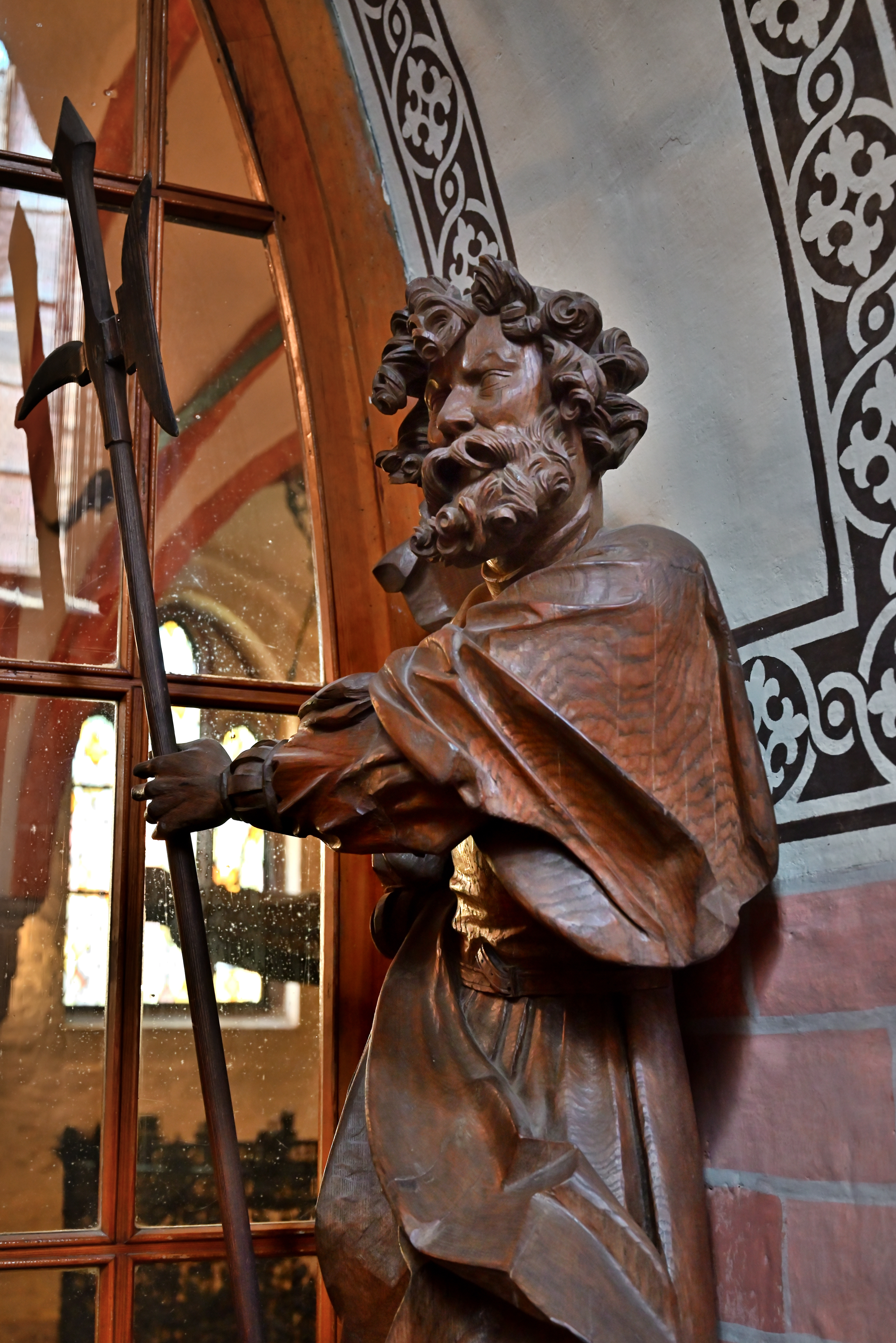
Judas Thaddäus with the halberd

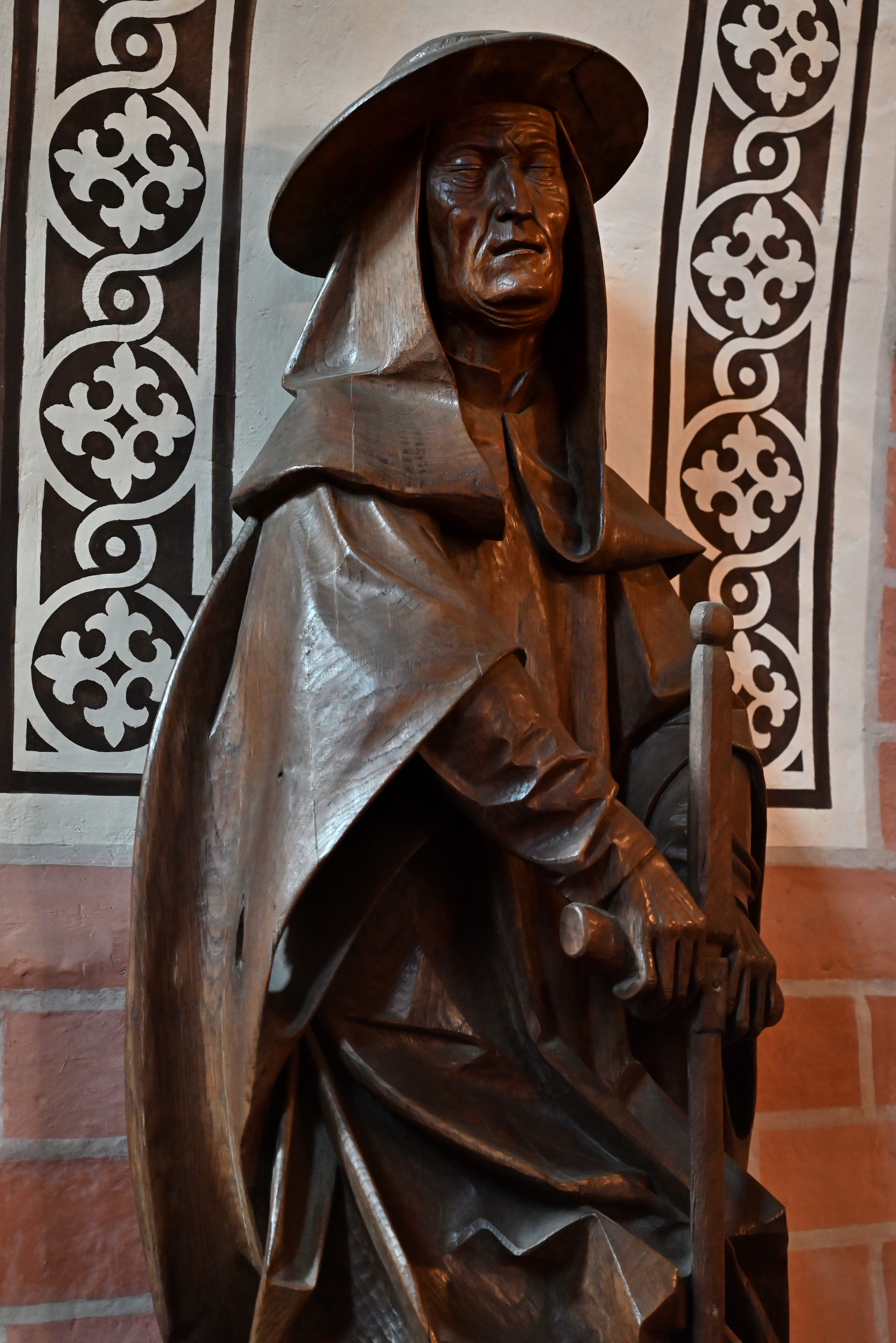
Matthäus with the dipstick

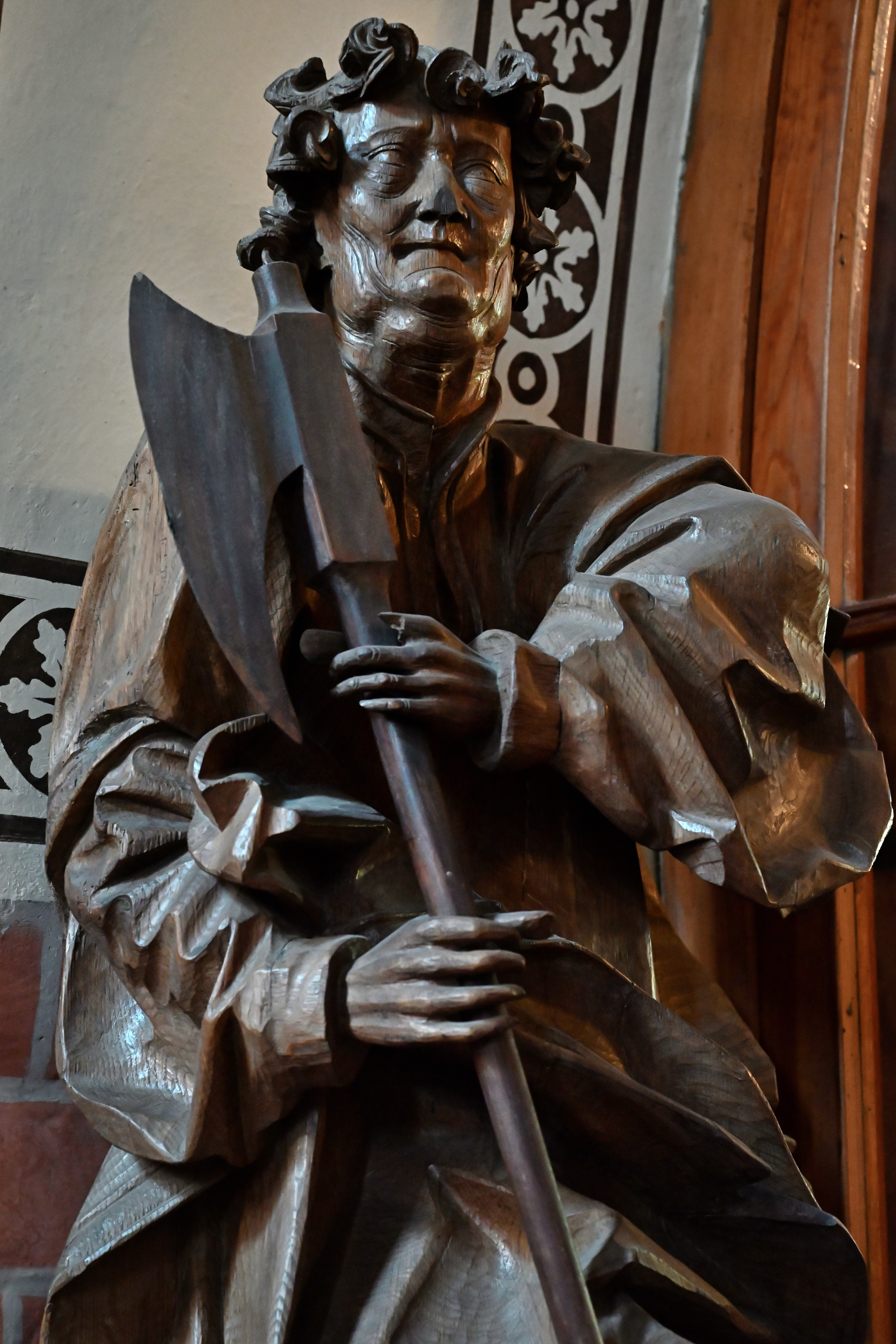
Matthias with the hatchet

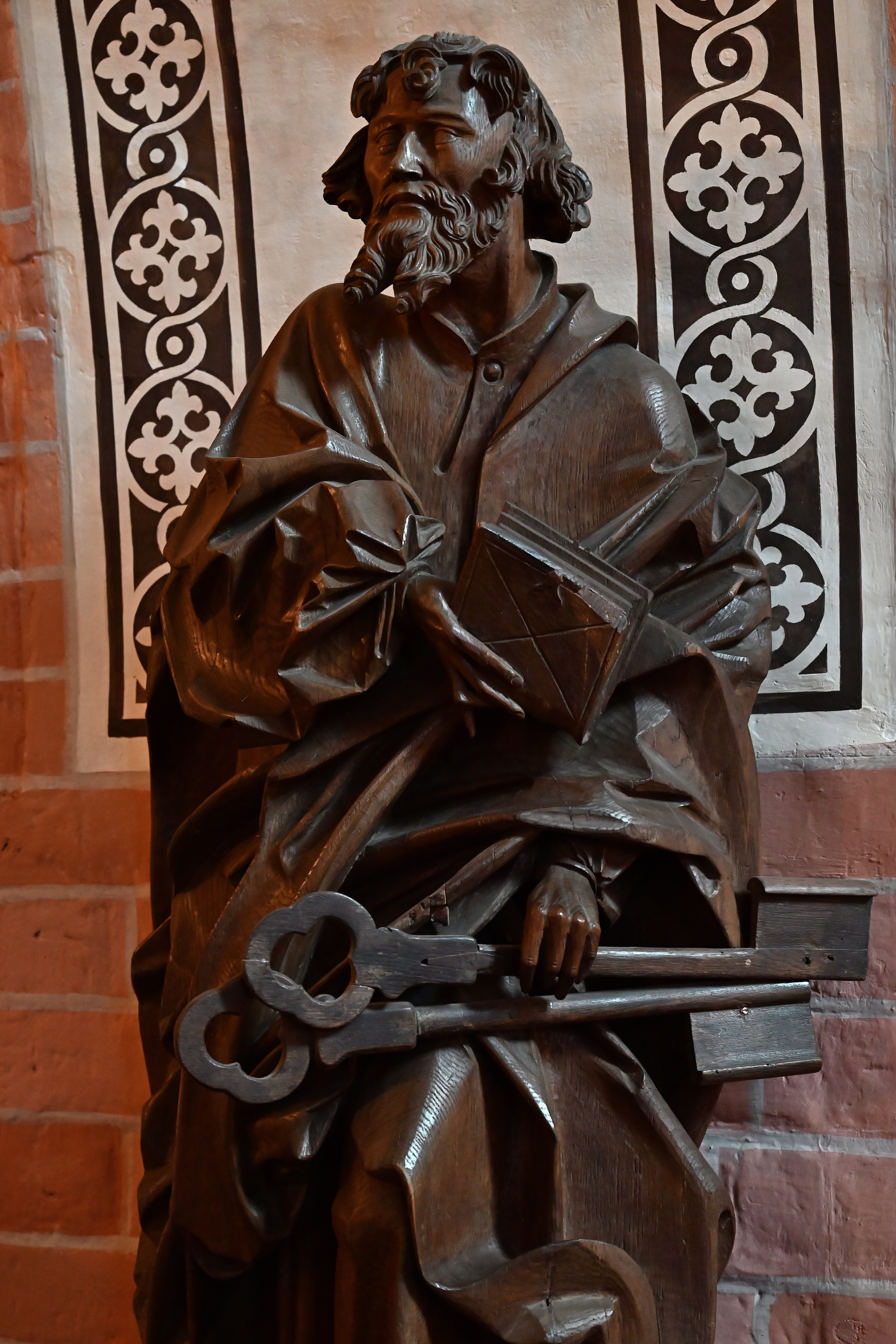
Petrus with the keys

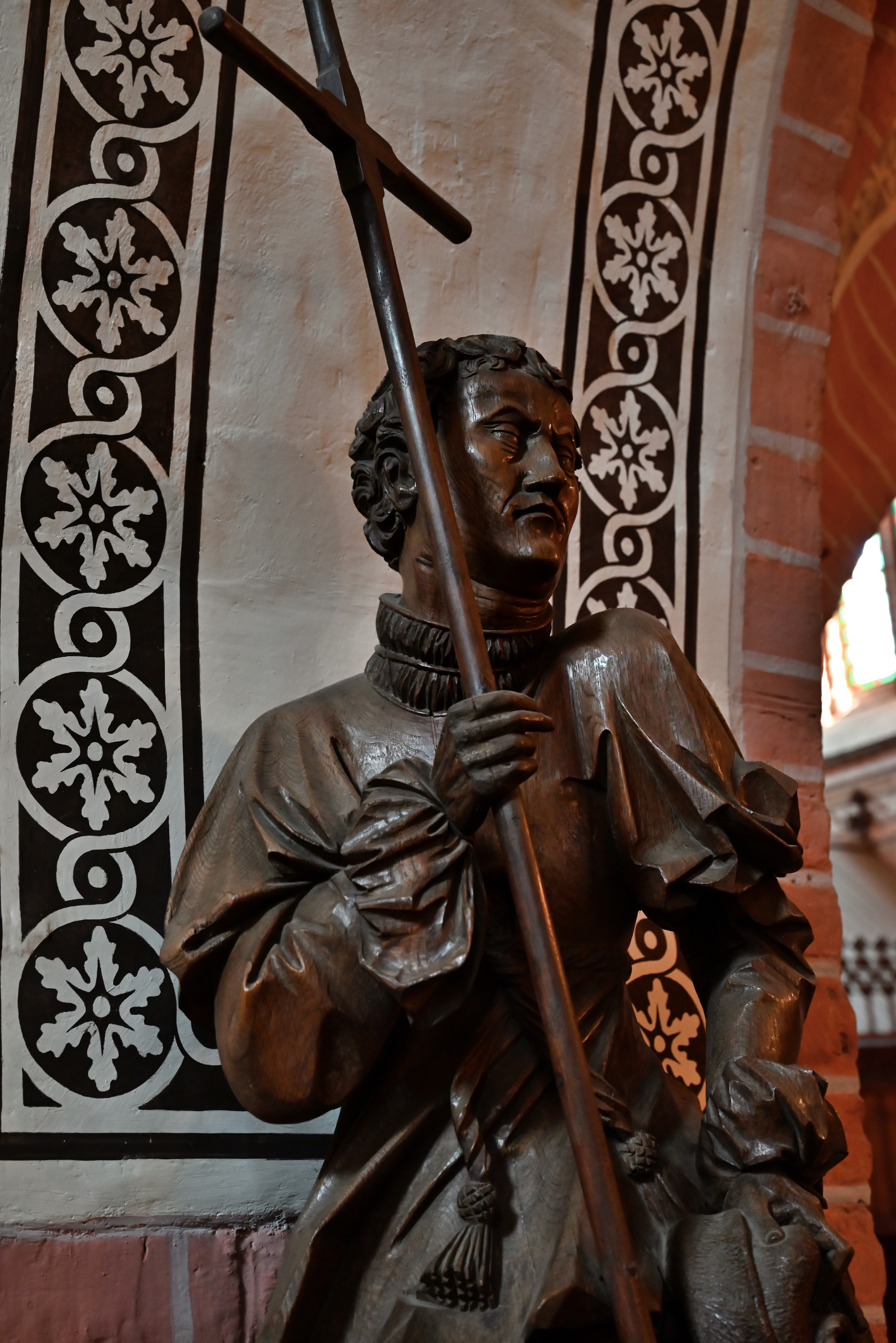
Philippus with the crossbar

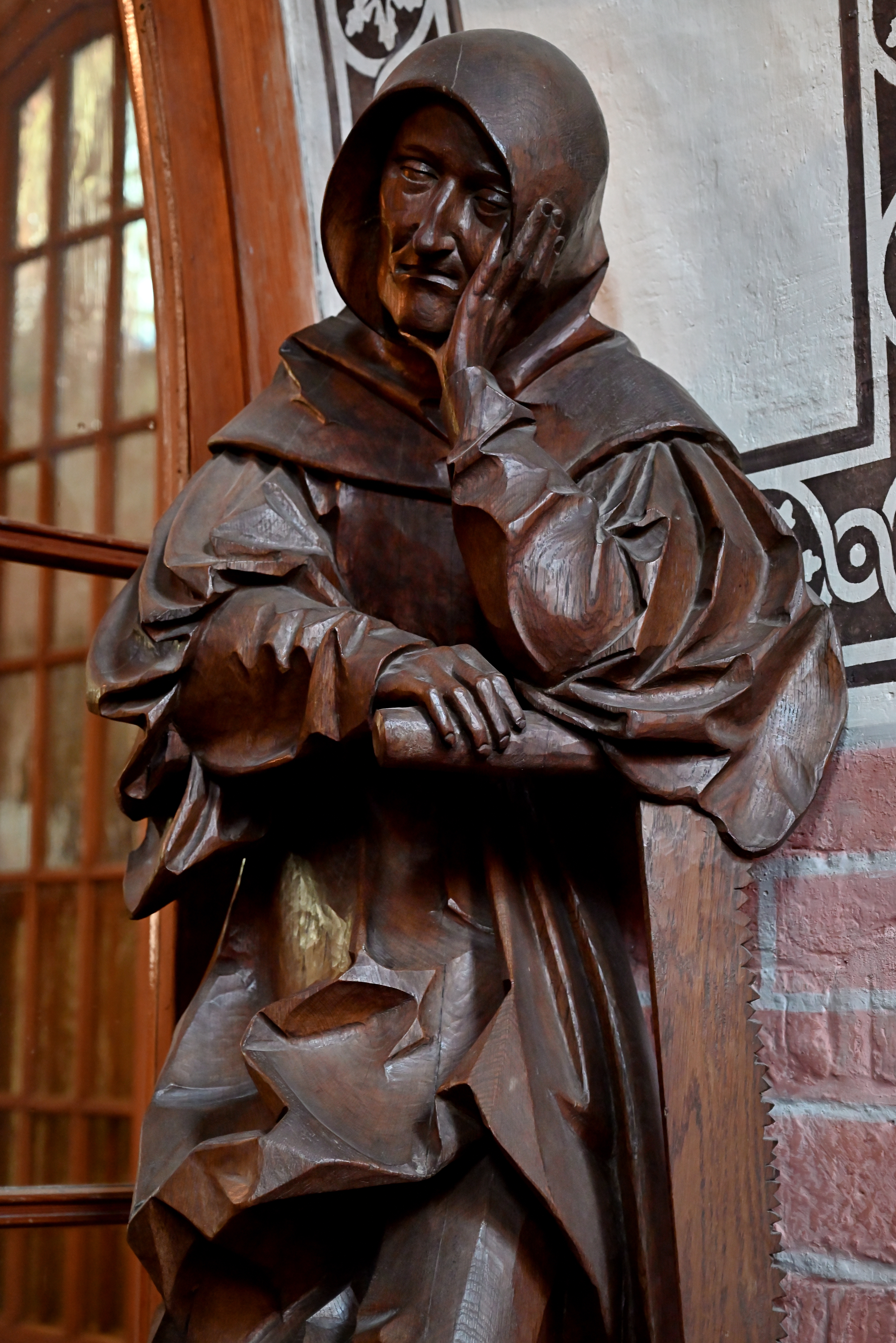
Simon with the saw

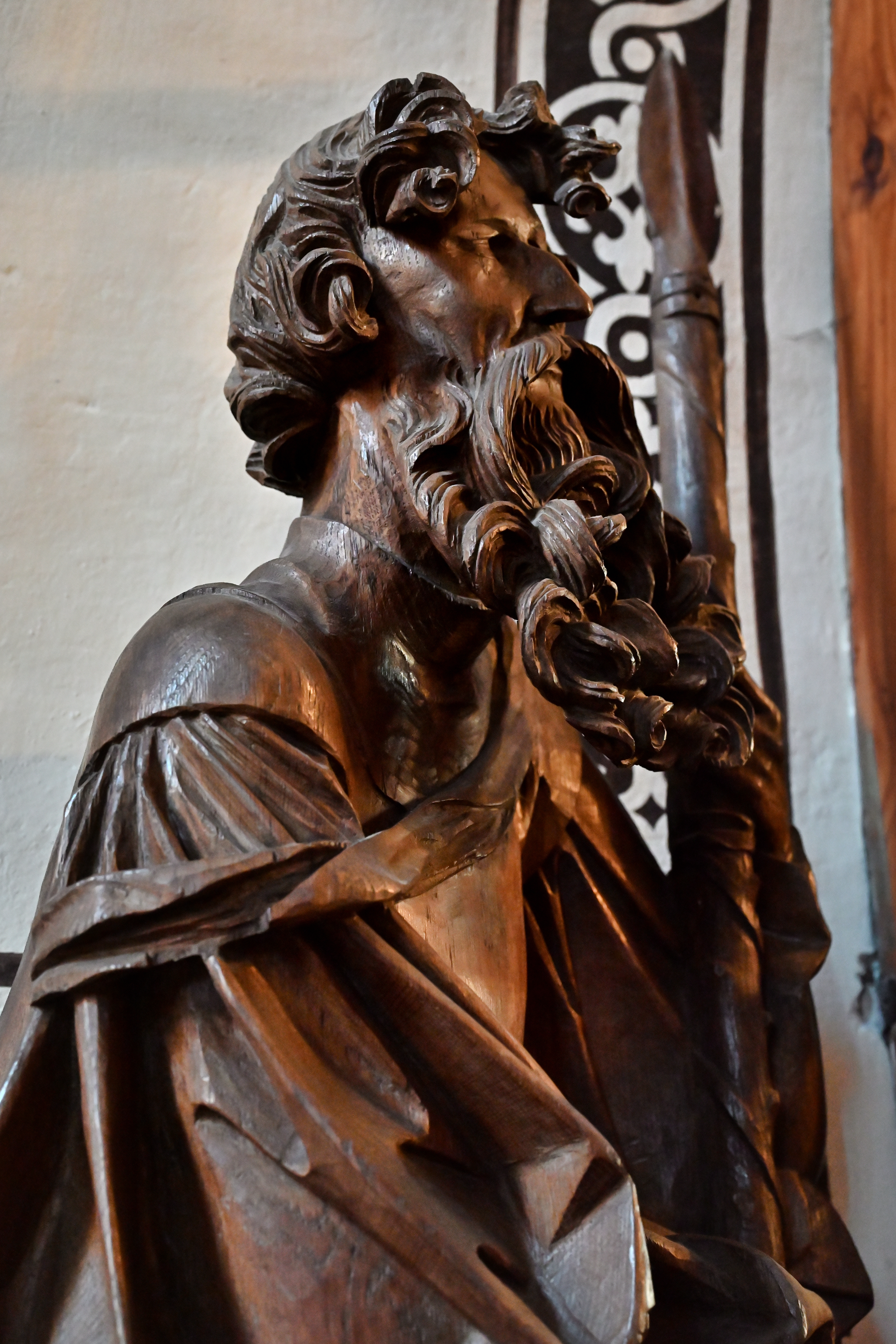
Thomas with the lance

== See also ==
- Danish sculpture
- Lindy West
