= Edele Kruchow =

Danish politician (1915–1989)

Clara Edele Bengta Kruchow née Langberg (1915–1989) was a Danish headmistress and politician. In 1965, the Danish Women's Council (DKN) appointed her to serve on the country's delegation to the United Nations. On her return to Denmark in 1967, she chaired the DKN until 1972. She later became a member of the Danish Commission to UNESCO. Representing the Social Liberal Party, she was a member of the Folketing from 1971 to 1977. During this period, she represented Denmark at the European Council, the European Parliament and the United Nations General Assembly.

== Biography ==
Born in the Frederiksberg district of Copenhagen on 22 October 1915, Clara Edele Bengta Kruchow was the daughter of the builder Hans Philip Edliot Langberg (1880–1927) and Kamma Emilie Frederikke Hansen (1885–1956). In 1943, she married Harry Kruchow (1907–1967), an academic. The couple had two children: Chresten (1946) and Lene (1950) who died from meningitis when she was one.

Kruchow was brought up in a well-to-do bourgeois home together with her two younger brothers, Harald, an art historian, and Gunnar, an army officer. After matriculating from the Frederiksberg School Statens Kursus til Studentereksamen in 1936, she went on to study history, geography and French at the University of Copenhagen, graduating in 1944.

On graduating, she taught at Lygby Statsskole. From 1949 to 1961, she was a board member of the History Teachers Union [Historielærerforening) and served on the board of the High School Teachers Union (Gymnasieskolernes Lærerforening) from 1953 to 1961.

At a time when it was unusual for women to head Danish high schools, she was appointed headmistress of Sortedam Gymnasium in 1960. In parallel, she developed an interest in politics, especially international aspects. In 1965, on a proposal from the DKN, she became a member of the Danish delegation to the United Nations. On her return to Denmark in 1967, she was elected chair of the DKN, serving until 1972. She also became a member of Denmark's UNESCO commission.

From 1970 to 1976, Kruchow represented the Social Liberals in Søllerød Municipality and from 1971 to 1977 served as a member of the Folketing. She was active in international affairs, representing Denmark at meetings of the European Council and the European Parliament. She was a candidate for the European Parliament in 1979 but was not elected.

In politics, Edele Kruchow was recognized for her diplomatic approach but also fought hard to have her views supported. She died on 4 September 1989 in Søllerød.
