= Jacob the Dacian =

Danish missionary

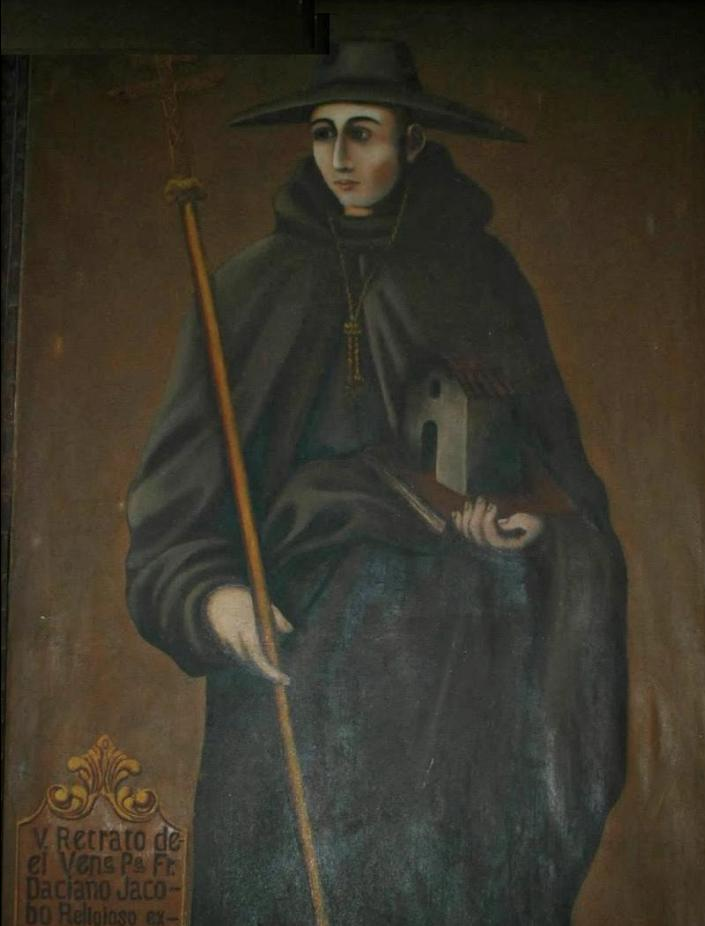
Jacob painted in 1906 by an unknown Mexican artist

Jacob the Dacian (Spanish: Jacobo Daciano; Latin: Jacobus de Dacia; c. 1484 – 1566) was a Danish-born Franciscan friar. He achieved fluency in eight languages and fame among the indigenous people of Michoacán as a righteous and helpful man toward his flock. His relics, now lost, were kept for a long time by the indigenous people of Tarécuato (in Tangamandapio) who still celebrate his birthday every year. Jacob has been identified as a son of King John of Denmark.

== Name ==
The translation of his name into Medieval Latin as Iacobus de Dacia reflects the fact that, in Scandinavian contexts during the Middle Ages, the Latin toponym Dacia stood for Denmark.

Brother Jacob also went by the name Iacobus Gottorpius, referring to the royal estate of Gottorp (now located in Germany), and also signed as Jacobus Danus "Jacob the Dane".

== Royal descent ==
Danish historian Jørgen Nybo Rasmussen (Rasmussen 1974, 1986) has asserted that Jacob was a son (possibly extramarital) of King John of the Kalmar Union and a younger brother of King Christian II, both Danes. This has not been mentioned by all historians but is also the basis for a novel Brother Jacob by Danish author Henrik Stangerup. Key arguments in a case for Jacob's royal lineage are the facts that he described himself as coming from Gottorp, the estate of Kings Christian I and John of Denmark; that he had an excellent education normally reserved for the higher nobility; and that he seemed to enjoy the protection of higher political forces. It was also common for younger sons of royalty to enter into the clergy, since they normally would not inherit the thrones. Jacob's position as an inter-continental missionary would have been very unusual for a royal prince.

A number of modern authors have counted Jacob – or James – as a Danish-Norwegian-Swedish prince and one of the legitimate children of King John and Queen Christina, but Rasmussen's thesis was also met with scepticism. Queen Margrethe II of Denmark visited his burial site, in respect to Jacob being a famous brother of one of her House of Oldenburg ancestors and predecessors, while on a state visit to Mexico in 2006.

== Life in Denmark until the Reformation ==
Entering the Franciscan Order as a young man, Jacob received a good education studying Latin, Greek and Hebrew as well as his mother tongues German and Danish. In the years prior to the reformation he lived in a convent in Malmø (now in Sweden), where he argued against the Lutheran leaders. In 1530 the Fransciscans were driven from the convent, as they were in the following from the other Danish towns. He described this in the Chronicle of the expulsion of the Greyfriars, written to serve as evidence in a potential trial to attempt to reclaim the convents later. Such a trial never came. During the religious wars known as the Count's Feud, fought between the supporters of his deposed brother, the Catholic King Christian II, and the forces of King Christian III of Denmark, many Franciscans left Denmark and went to Catholic provinces in northern Germany.

Jacob stayed in Denmark until the fall of Malmø in 1536 when the region's Lutheran Reformation was completed and the proscription of Mendicant orders forced him into exile. First he went to Mecklenburg under the protection of Duke Albrecht who had fought on the Catholic side in the civil war. Here he was made the last Provincial (head) of the Franciscan province of Dacia, whence his name. He subsequently went to Spain where he studied the Arabic language and was authorized by King Charles V of Spain to go to New Spain as a missionary.

== Missionary to Mexico ==
In 1542, Brother Jacob arrived in Veracruz, and was to remain in New Spain for the rest of his life, learning several indigenous languages and founding several convents. He spent three years at the Colegio de Santa Cruz de Tlatelolco studying Nahuatl before being sent to Michoacán to work among the Purépecha, where the bulk of his missionary work was done. He learned the Purépecha language and worked ardently to improve Indian rights, causing problems with the colonial authorities and with local church leadership, alike. He wrote a treatise, Declamacion del pueblo barbaro de los Indios, que habiendo recibido el bautismo, desean recibir los demas sacramentos, in which he argued that Indians should be allowed to be ordained into the priesthood. In this question he was overruled by church authorities and had to do penitence for these actions – he had claimed that denying Indians the right to ordination was in fact tantamount to heresy, a standpoint which has been vindicated in the modern Roman Catholic Church.

He died in the convent of Tarécuato, in the bishopric of Zamora where he had served as a guardian. Beginning in 1996, attempts have been made toward his canonization.
