= Edele Jernskjæg =

Edele Jernskjæg (died 1512) was a Danish noble, courtier and the royal mistress of King John I of Denmark.

Daughter of the poor noble Mikkel Andersen Jernskjæg and Margrethe Andersdatter af Særslev, she was made maid of honor of the queen, Christina of Saxony, in 1496. She followed the queen to Stockholm in 1499, where her affair with the king drew attention. In Sweden, it was noticed that she used the king's personal sleigh, and the political opposition used the relationship between her and the king in their criticism against John's rule.

In 1501, she returned to Denmark with the king, while the queen stayed behind. The monarch married her to the noble Torben Bille, who was made the master of the Abrahamstrup (Jægerspris) and Vordingborg. The relationship between Edele and king John continued after her marriage, and the monarch visited her regularly at Vordingborg until her death in 1512, shortly before his. She was described as a humorous beauty.
