= Naesbyhoved Lake =

- Næsbyhoved Sø (Danish)
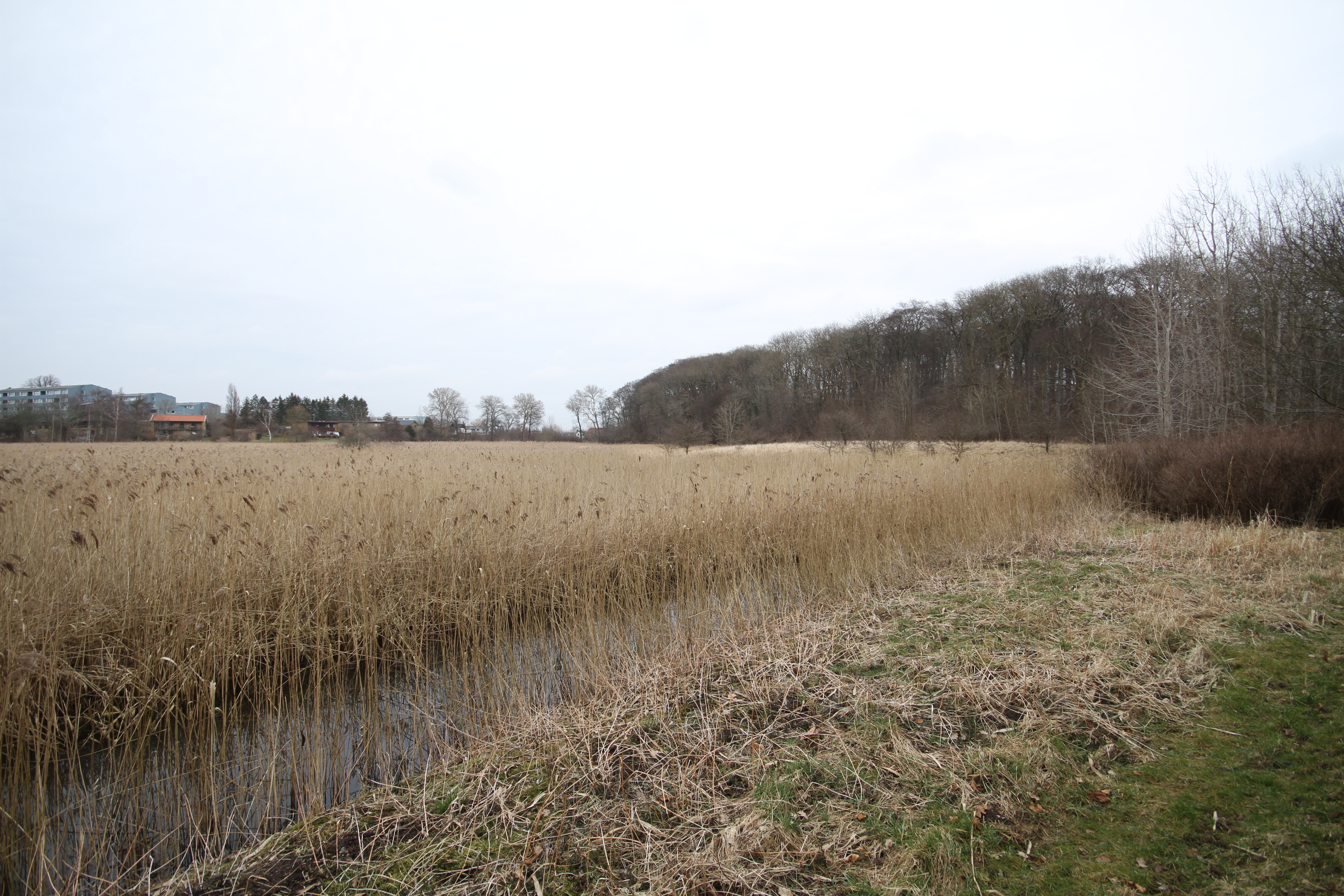
- Naesbyhoved, former lake

- Location within Region of Southern Denmark Location within Denmark
- Interactive map of Naesbyhoved Lake
- Location: Odense
- Coordinates: 55°25′40″N 10°22′57″E
- Type: Dry lake
- Basin countries: Denmark
- Surface area: 1.65 km^{2} (0.64 sq mi)

Naesbyhoved Lake (Danish: Næsbyhoved Sø) was a lake in Denmark, 1 mile (1.6 km) north of Odense's current center. Measuring approximately 1.65 km^{2} (0.64 sq mi), it was the second largest lake on the island of Funen after Arreskov Lake, and was until desiccation in 1863, a popular destination for Odense's residents.

A small part of the lake's eastern section is included in the Odense Canal and Odense Inner Harbour, which had been excavated in the years 1796 to 1804 (and subsequent expansion), while the rest of the parched land passed to include Åløkke Farm.

The lake supported five islands: Store Thor Lund (and Little Thor Lund), Great Holm Brase, Brase Small Holm, Vieholmen and Gåseholmen. Naesbyhoved Castle (Næsbyhoved Slot) was on a peninsula from the lake's northern shore; it was destroyed during the Count's Feud in 1534.
