= Hemming Gadh =

Swedish bishop (d. 1520)

Hemming Gadh (c. 1450 – 16 December 1520) was a Swedish Roman Catholic priest and Bishop of the Diocese of Linköping. He was a staunch ally of Sten Sture and a fierce opponent of Denmark and the Kalmar Union.

== Biography ==
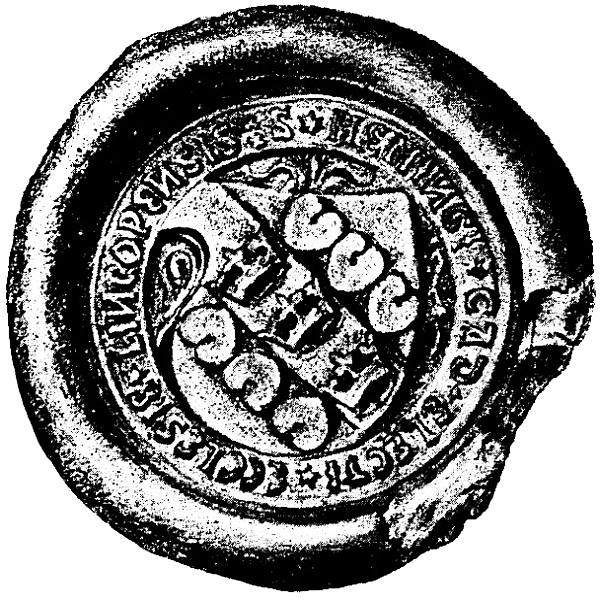
Seal of Hemming Gadh as bishop, 1501

Hemming Olofsson Gadh was born around 1450 at Hossmo parish in Kalmar County, Sweden. He studied legal and ecclesiastical law at the University of Greifswald and University of Rostock. In 1479 he became chancellor and secretary for Henrik Tidemansson, Bishop of the Diocese of Linköping. Gadh was later that year selected by Sten Sture the Elder as an envoy in Rome.

He was a master in gaining well paid posts, which he did not take up, but rather sold for a good price. He did however choose to take up his new position when at the request of Sten Sture, he was elected as bishop of the Diocese of Linköping in 1501 after the death of his predecessor Henrik Tidemansson.

He did not manage to get the post confirmed by the Pope within the statuted three months. This had as a consequence the Spanish cardinal Jaume Serra i Cau appointed as administrator. In 1506 Gadh was excommunicated by the Pope and in 1513 Hans Brask (1464–1538) gained the position as bishop.

During the Dano-Swedish War (1501–1512) he led troops against Kalmar and worked as a Swedish ambassador in Lübeck between 1510 and 1512. He was captured by the Danes in October 1518. He was on King Christian II's fleet to Stockholm in 1520 and played a role in allowing the Danes entrance to the city. However the King did not trust the excommunicated bishop. After the Stockholm Bloodbath, he was taken to Raseborg Castle in Finland where he was beheaded by order of King Christian II of Denmark.

Preceded by Henrik Tidemansson	Bishop of Linköping; 1501–1512	Succeeded by Hans Brask
