= Chief Court Mistress =

Title in a royal court

Court Mistress (Danish: hofmesterinde; Dutch: hofmeesteres; German: Hofmeisterin; Norwegian: hoffmesterinne; Swedish: hovmästarinna) or chief court mistress (Danish: overhofmesterinde; Dutch: grootmeesteres, lit. 'grand mistress'; German: Obersthofmeisterin; Norwegian: overhoffmesterinne; Swedish: överhovmästarinna; Russian: обер-гофмейстерина, romanized: ober-gofmeysterina) is or was the title of the senior lady-in-waiting in the courts of Austria, Denmark, Norway, the Netherlands, Sweden, Imperial Russia, and the German princely and royal courts.

== Chief court mistresses of Austria ==
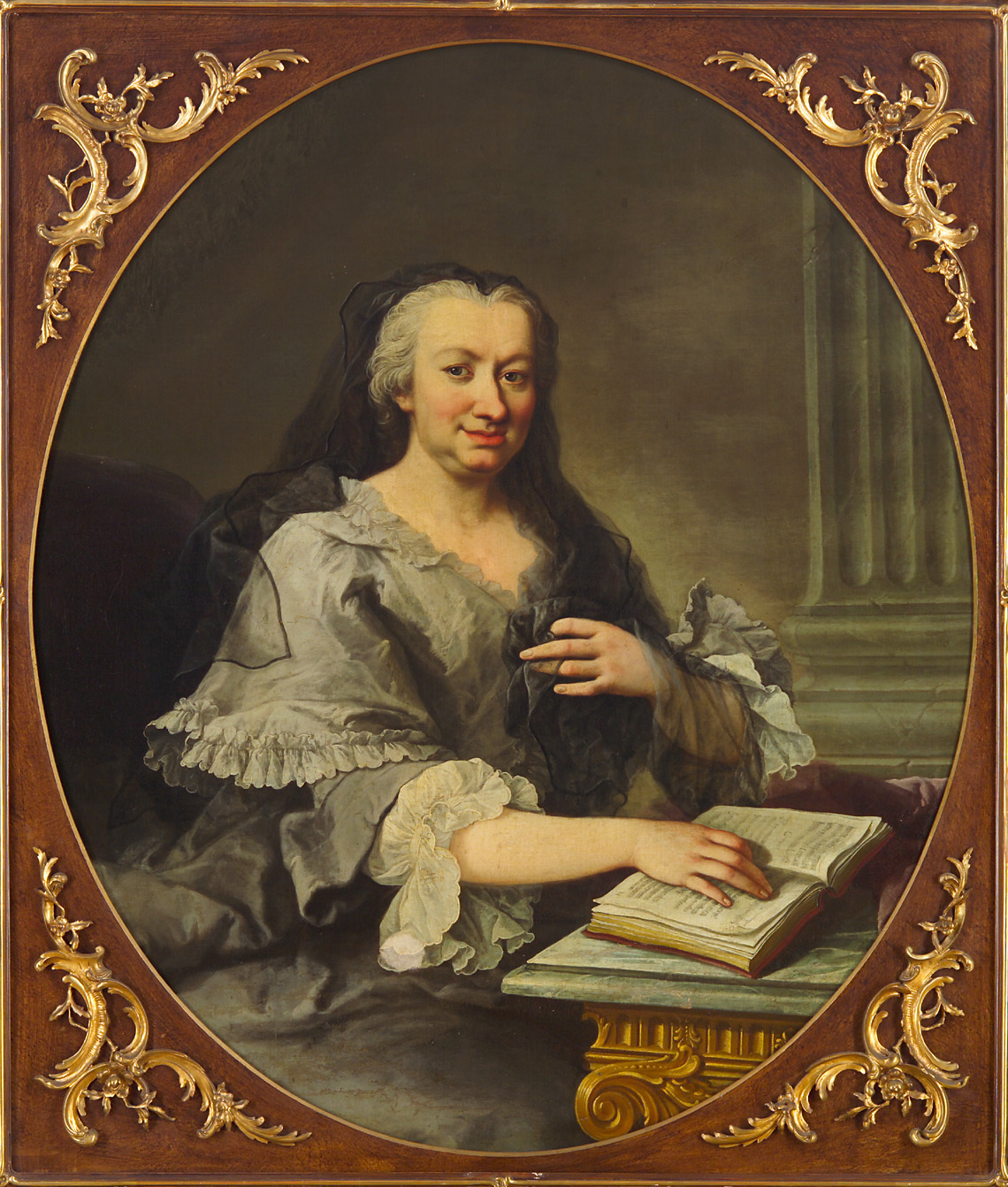
Marie Karoline von Fuchs-Mollard

In 1619, a set organisation was finally established for the Austrian Imperial court which came to be the characteristic organisation of the Austrian-Habsburg court roughly kept from this point onward. The first rank of the female courtiers was the Obersthofmeisterin, who was second in rank after the empress herself, and responsible for all the female courtiers. Whenever absent, she was replaced by the Fräuleinhofmeisterin, normally in charge of the unmarried female courtiers, their conduct and service.

=== Anna of Tyrol, 1608–1618 ===
- 1611–1618: Freiin Katharina v. Kollowrath-L.

=== Eleonora Gonzaga , 1622–1658 ===
- 1621–1624: Gräfin Maria Anna v. Portia
- 1624–1637: Gräfin Ursula v. Attems
- 1637–1644: Freiin Margarita v. Herberstein
- 1647–1647: Gräfin Octavia Strozzi
- 1652–1655: Freiin Anna Eleonora v. Metternich

=== Maria Anna of Spain, 1631–1646 ===
- 1630–1638: Victoria de Toledo y Colonna
- 1643–1646: Marquesa de Flores Dávila

=== Maria Leopoldine of Austria, 1648–1649 ===
- 1648–1649: Gräfin Anna Eleonora v. Wolkenstein 1648–1649

=== Eleonora Gonzaga, 1651–1686 ===
- 1651–1658: Gräfin Maria Elisabeth v. Wagensperg

=== Maria Theresa of Austria, 1740–1780 ===
- 1740–1754: Gräfin Marie Karoline von Fuchs-Mollard

=== Empress Elisabeth of Austria, 1854–1898 ===
- 1854–1862: Gräfin Sophie Esterházy
- 1862– : Gräfin Pauline von Königsegg
- Maria Welser, Gräfin von Welsersheimb Freiin zu Gumpenstein

== Chief court mistresses of Denmark ==
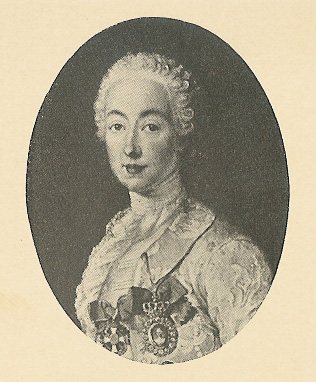
Louise von Plessen

The early modern Danish court was organized according to the German court model, in turn inspired by the Imperial Austrian court model, from the 16th century onward.

The highest rank female courtier to a female royal was the hofmesterinde (Court Mistress) from 1694/98 onward named Overhofmesterinde (Chief Court Mistress), equivalent to the Mistress of the Robes, normally an elder widow, who supervised the rest of the ladies-in-waiting.

The Princess Anne of Denmark married James VI of Scotland in 1589, and Fru Ide Ulfstand was appointed hofmesterinde to her new household. In Scotland, Margaret Stewart, Mistress of Ochiltree seems to have fulfilled the role.

When the office was vacant the tasks were taken over by the second in command, the kammarfrøken. This was also the case when the office of hofmesterinde to the queen was left vacant in 1808–23 and 1839–45, and was handled by Friederiche Amalie Marie Hedevig von der Manfe and Marie Ernestine Wilhelmine von Walterstorf respectively.

=== Christina of Saxony, 1481–1513 ===
- 1490–1496: Sidsel Lunge
- 1503–1516: Anne Meinstrup

=== Isabella of Austria, 1515–1523 ===
- 1516–1517: Anne Meinstrup
- 1517–1523: Sigbrit Willoms

=== Sophie of Pomerania, 1523–1533 ===
- 1526–1533: Anne Meinstrup

=== Dorothea of Saxe-Lauenburg, 1534–1571 ===
- 1557–1558: Fru Kirstine.
- 1558– : Anne Albertsdatter Glob-Urne.

=== Sophie of Mecklenburg-Güstrow, 1572–1631 ===
- 1572–1584: Inger Oxe
- 1584–1592: Beate Clausdatter Bille

=== Anne Catherine of Brandenburg, 1597–1612 ===
- 1597–1612: Beate Huitfeldt

=== Sophie Amalie of Brunswick-Lüneburg, 1648–1685 ===
- Lucie von Løschebrand
- 1657–1685: Maria Elisabeth von Haxthausen

=== Charlotte Amalie of Hesse-Kassel, 1670–1714 ===
- 1677–1692: Juliane Elisabeth von Uffeln
- 1695–1705: Dorothea Justina Haxthausen
- 1705–1707: Sophie Dorothea von Schack von Marschalck
- Louise Charlotte von Schlaberndorf

=== Louise of Mecklenburg-Güstrow, 1699–1721 ===
- 1699–1716: Abel Cathrine Buchwald

=== Anne Sophie Reventlow, 1721–1743 ===
- Fru von Grabow

=== Sophie Magdalene of Brandenburg-Kulmbach, 1721–1770 ===
- Beate Henriette af Reuss-Lobenstein

=== Louise of Great Britain, 1746–1751 ===
- 1746–1751: Christiane Henriette Louise Juel (first term)

=== Juliana Maria of Brunswick-Wolfenbüttel, 1752–1796 ===
- 1752–1754: Christiane Henriette Louise Juel (second term)
- 1757–1767: Karen Huitfeldt
- 1772–1784: Margrethe von der Lühe
- 1784–1793: Sophie Louise Holck-Winterfeldt

=== Caroline Matilda of Great Britain, 1766–1775 ===
- 1766–1768: Louise von Plessen
- 1768–1768: Anne Sofie von Berckentin
- 1768–1770: Margrethe von der Lühe
- 1770–1772: Charlotte Elisabeth Henriette Holstein
- 1772–1775: Cathrine Charlotte von der Horst

=== Marie of Hesse-Kassel, 1808–1852 ===
- 1808–1823: Vacant
- 1823–1839: Lucie Charlotte Sehestedt Juul
- 1839–1852: Vacant

=== Caroline Amalie of Augustenburg, 1839–1881 ===
- 1839–1845: Vacant
- 1845–1859: Ingeborg Christiane Rosenørn

=== Louise of Hesse-Kassel, 1863–1898 ===
- 1864–1876: Ida Marie Bille
- 1876–1888: Julia Adelaide Harriet Raben-Levetzau
- 1888–1898: Louise Bille-Brahe (first term)

=== Louise of Sweden, 1906–1926 ===
- 1906–1910: Louise Bille-Brahe (second term)

=== Alexandrine of Mecklenburg-Schwerin, 1912–1952 ===
- 1912–1935: Louise Grevenkop-Castenskiold
- 1935–1952: Inger Wedell

== Chief court mistresses of Germany ==
The Austrian court model was the role model for the princely courts in Germany, and the post of Obersthofmeisterin, or only hofmeisterin, existed in the princely (and later royal) German courts as well.

The German court model in turn became the role model of the early modern Scandinavian courts of Denmark and Sweden.

Chief court mistress to the queens of Prussia and empresses of Germany

=== Sophia Louise of Mecklenburg-Schwerin, 1708–1713 ===
- Countess von Wittgenstein Valendar

=== Sophia Dorothea of Hanover, 1713–1757 ===
- Sophie von Kameke
- Susanna Magdalena Finck von Finckenstein

=== Elisabeth Christine of Brunswick-Wolfenbüttel-Bevern, 1740–1797 ===
- 1740–1742: Christiane von Katsch (the same position with the crown princess since 1733)
- 1742–1766: Sophie Caroline von Camas
- 1766–1797: Charlotte Albertine von Kannenberg

=== Louise of Mecklenburg-Strelitz, 1797–1810 ===
- 1797–1810: Sophie Marie von Voß (the same position with the crown princess since 1793)

=== Elisabeth Ludovika of Bavaria, 1840–1873 ===
- Wilhelmine van Reede-Ginkel

=== Augusta of Saxe-Weimar-Eisenach, 1861–1891 ===
- Gabriele von Bülow

=== Augusta Victoria of Schleswig-Holstein, 1888–1918 ===
- Therese von Brockdorff

== Chief court mistresses of the Netherlands ==
In the 16th-century, the principal lady-in-waiting in the courts of the Habsburg governors of the Netherlands, Margaret of Austria and Mary of Hungary (governor of the Netherlands), was named hofmesterees ('Court mistress') or dame d'honneur.

The principal female office holder in the royal court of the Kingdom of the Netherlands in the 19th century was named Grootmeesteres ('Grand Mistress').

=== Wilhelmine of Prussia, Queen of the Netherlands, 1815–1837 ===
- 1818–1824: Agneta Margaretha Catharina Fagel-Boreel
- 1823–1837: Sophie Wilhelmina barones van Heeckeren van Kell (1772–1847)

=== Anna Pavlovna of Russia, 1840–1865 ===
- 1840–1844: Sophie Wilhelmina barones van Heeckeren van Kell (1772–1847)
- 1844–1850: Rose Amour Caroline Aya Gislène(Zézette) Falck, geb. barones De Roisin (1792–1850)
- 1850–1852: Johanna Philippina Hermanna barones van Knobelsdorff (1772–1860)

=== Sophie of Württemberg, 1849–1877 ===
- 1849–1858: Anna Maria Margaretha Deutz van Assendelft – Rendorp (1797–1858)
- 1858–1878: Alida van der Oudermeulen barones van Wickevoort Crommelin (1806–1883)

=== Emma of Waldeck and Pyrmont, 1879–1934 ===
- 1879–1894: Leopoldine Marie gravin van Limburg Stirum (1817–1894)
- 1894–1909: Wilhelmina Elizabeth Charlotta gravin Van Lynden van Sandenburg (1869–1930)

=== Wilhelmina of the Netherlands, 1890–1962 ===
- 1909–1938: Agneta Hendrika Groeninx van Zoelen-Van de Poll (1857–1933)
- 1924–1938: Gerarda Cornelia barones van Nagell (1878–1946)
- 1938–1954: Cornelie Marie, barones van Tuyll van Serooskerken

=== Juliana of the Netherlands, 1948–2004 ===
- 1954–1957: Adolphine Agneta barones Van Heeckeren van Molecaten-Groeninx van Zoelen (1885–1967)

== Chief court mistresses of Norway ==
During the union of Sweden-Norway in 1814–1905, Sweden and Norway shared the same royal family. At that time, there were two Chief Court Mistress for the same queen: one as Queen of Sweden at the Swedish royal court when she lived in Sweden, and a separate Chief Court Mistress as Queen of Norway at the Norwegian royal court, who served in her post during the visits of the Swedish-Norwegian royal family to Norway.

Presently, the overhoffmesterinne in Norway acts as a vice hostess at the Norwegian royal court when the queen and the other female members of the royal family are absent.

=== Hedvig Elisabeth Charlotte of Holstein-Gottorp, 1814–1818 ===
- 1817–1818: Karen Wedel-Jarlsberg

=== Désirée Clary, 1823–1861 ===
- 1825–1844: Karen Wedel-Jarlsberg

=== Josephine of Leuchtenberg, 1844–1876 ===
- 1844–1845: Karen Wedel-Jarlsberg
- 1846–1859: Fanny Løvenskiold

=== Louise of the Netherlands, 1859–1871 ===
- 1859–1871: Juliane Cathrine Wilhelmine Wedel Jarlsberg

=== Sophia of Nassau, 1872–1905 ===
- 1873–1887: Alette Due
- 1887–1905: Elise Løvenskiold

=== Maud of Wales, 1905–1938 ===
- 1906–1925: Marie Magdalena Rustad
- 1925–1927: Emma Stang
- 1927–1938: Borghild Anker

== Chief court mistresses of Russia ==
In 1722, the Russian Imperial court was reorganized in accordance with the reforms of Peter the Great to Westernize Russia, and the old court offices of the Tsarina was replaced with court offices inspired by the German model. Accordingly, the new principal lady in waiting of the Russian empress was named Ober-Hofmeisterin.

=== Catherine I of Russia, 1713–1725 ===
- Matryona Balk
- Agrippina Petrovna Volkonskaia
- 1727–1727: Varvara Michajlovna Arsen'eva

=== Anna of Russia, 1730–1740 ===
- 1730–1740: Tatyana Borisovna Golitsyna, spouse of Mikhail Mikhailovich Golitsyn (Field Marshal)

=== Elizabeth of Russia, 1741–1762 ===
- 1741–1750: Tatyana Borisovna Golitsyna, spouse of Mikhail Mikhailovich Golitsyn (Field Marshal)
- 1760–1762: Anna Vorontsova

=== Catherine II of Russia, 1762–1796 ===
- 1762–1775: Anna Vorontsova
- 1776–1788: Maria Rumyantseva

=== Maria Feodorovna (Sophie Dorothea of Württemberg), 1796–1828 ===
- 1796–1804: Anna Matyushkina

=== Elizabeth Alexeievna (Louise of Baden), 1801–1826 ===
- 1823–1825: Alexandra Branitskaya

=== Alexandra Feodorovna (Charlotte of Prussia), 1825–1860 ===
- 1825–1838: Alexandra Branitskaya

=== Maria Alexandrovna (Marie of Hesse and by Rhine), 1855–1880 ===
- 1855–1863: Yekaterina Saltykov (in position since 1840)

=== Maria Feodorovna (Dagmar of Denmark), 1881–1917 ===
- 1881–1881: Princess Julia Kurakina (in position since 1866)
- 1881–1888: Princess Hélene Kotchoubey
- 1888–1906: Countess Anna Stroganoff

=== Alexandra Feodorovna (Alix of Hesse), 1894–1917 ===
- 1894–1910: Maria Golitzyna
- 1910–1917: Elizaveta Narishkina

== Chief court mistresses of Sweden ==
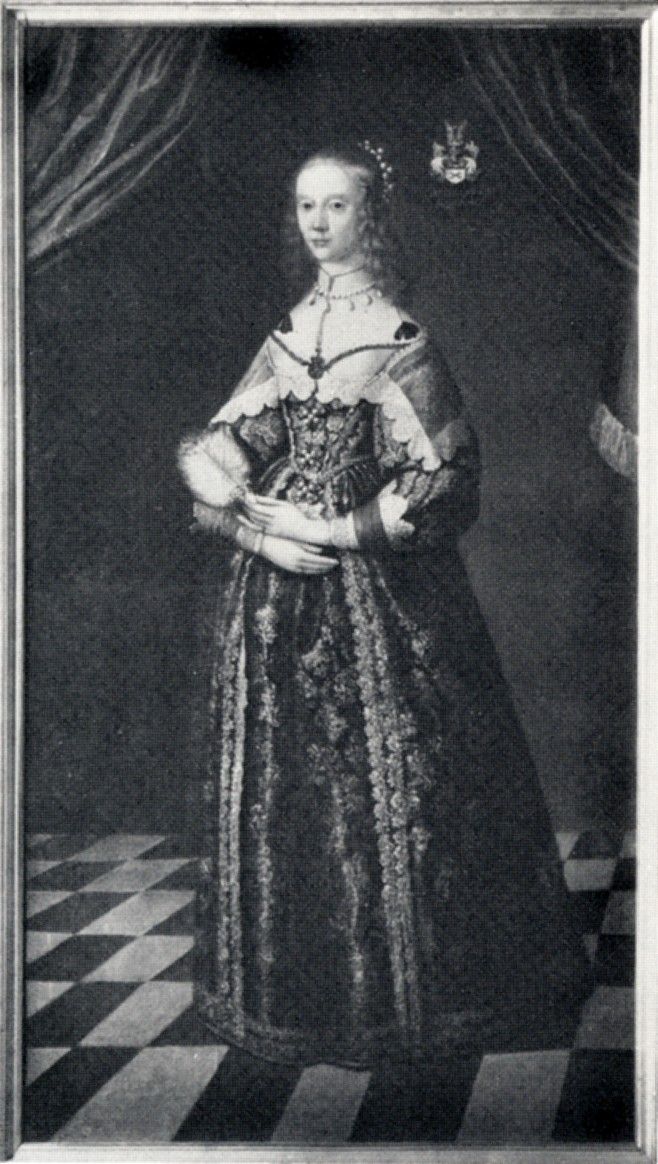
Maria Sofia De la Gardie

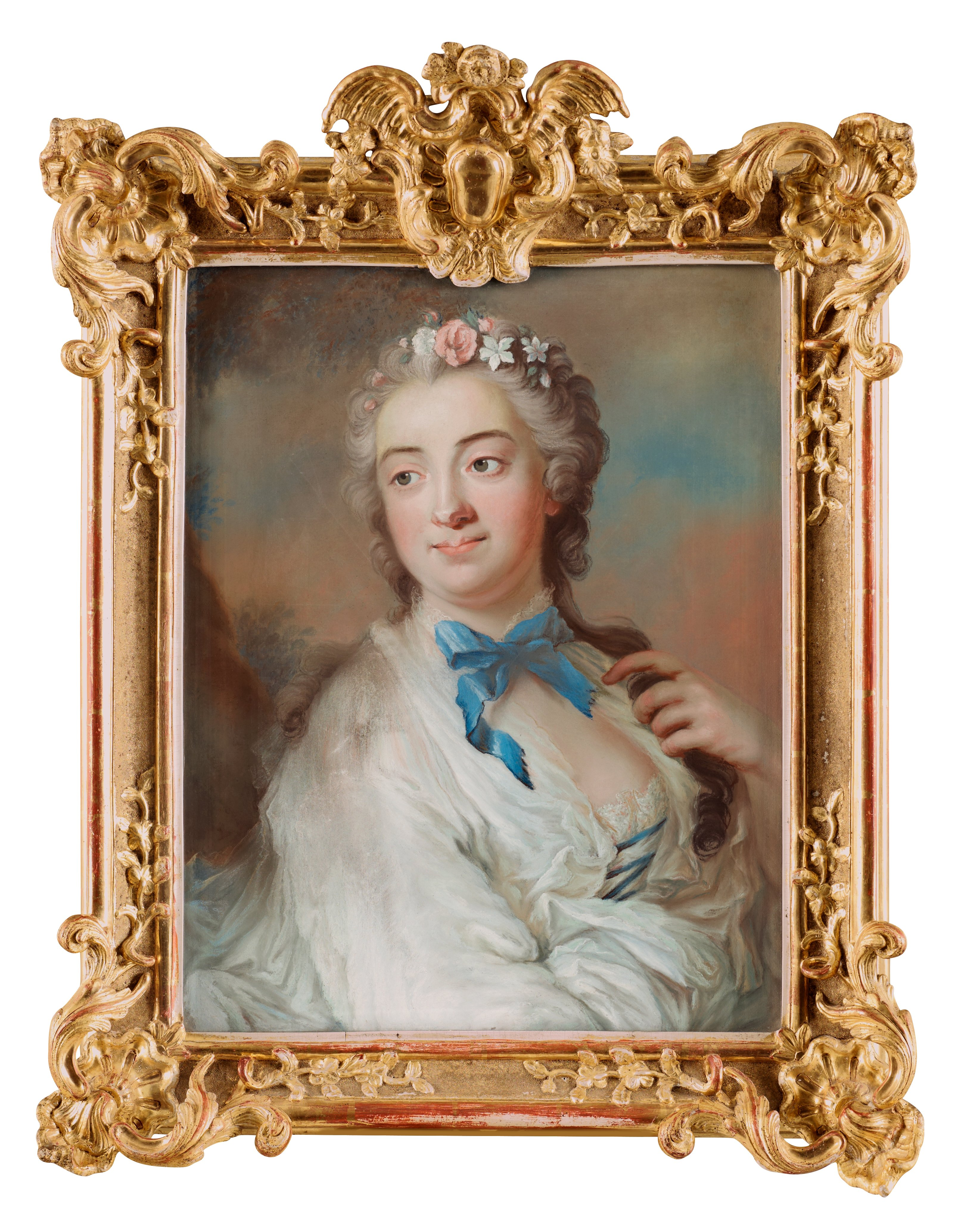
Charlotta Fredrika Sparre

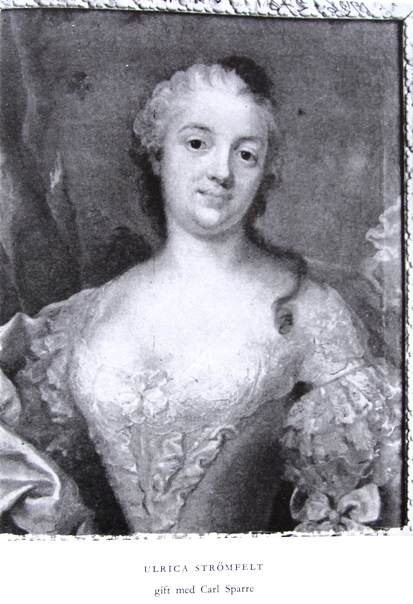
Ulrica Strömfelt

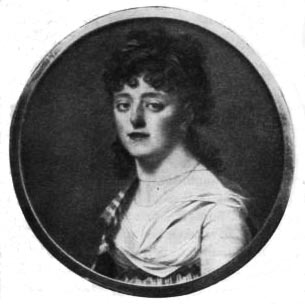
Charlotta Aurora De Geer

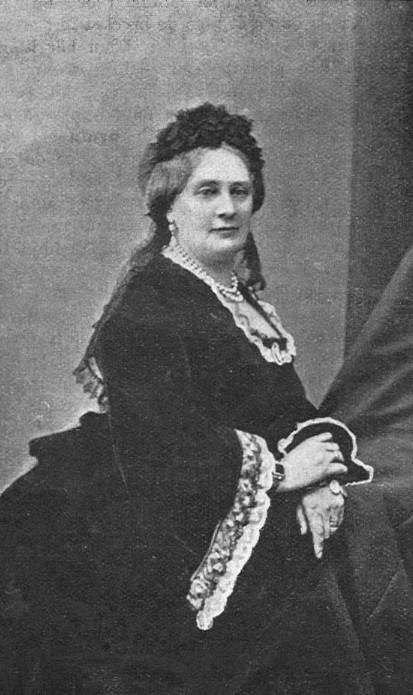
Wilhelmina Bonde

In Sweden, the Chief Court Mistress is the second highest-ranking official of the royal household, preceded only by the Marshal of the Realm. She ranks immediately below the members of the royal family, the speaker of the Parliament and the prime minister, and has precedence over former speakers of the Parliament and former prime ministers. The incumbent is Kirstine von Blixen-Finecke, who has served from 2016.

The title and position have changed over time. Before the reign of Queen Christina (1632–1654), the title was generally referred to as hovmästarinna (Court Mistress), but during and after the reign of Christina, it became the custom to have two such Court mistresses subordinate to one överhovmästarinna (Chief Court Mistress). Only the Queen and the Queen Dowager had a Chief Court Mistress called överhovmästarinna (the Chief Court Mistress) while the equivalent at the courts of other female members of the royal house was called hovmästarinna (Court Mistress).

The position was the highest a female courtier could have in the Swedish royal court, and the överhovmästarinna was ranked an Excellency, something unusual for a woman in the 17th century, which placed her immediately after the female members of the royal house in rank. Her role was to uphold etiquette at court, and receive and carry out the instructions of the Queen in the management of the court. She managed the employment of new members to the court of the Queen, and every meeting and letter to the Queen passed through her. She also managed the ceremony of the court presentation, in which nobles were presented to the royal family and thus allowed to show themselves officially at court. She could also represent the Queen on some occasions at court ceremonies and parties as hostess.

=== Catherine Stenbock, 1552–1621 ===
- 1552–1568: Anna Hogenskild

=== Karin Månsdotter, 1567–1568 ===
- 1567–1569: Elin Andersdotter

=== Catherine Jagellon, 1568–1583 ===
- 1568–1583: Karin Gyllenstierna

=== Gunilla Bielke, 1585–1597 ===
- 1587–1592: Kerstin Oxenstierna

=== Christina of Holstein-Gottorp, 1604–1625 ===
- 1604–1608: Carin Ulfsdotter Snakeborg
- 1608–1612: Gunilla Jönsdotter Struss
- 1612–1619: Carin Kyle

=== Maria Eleonora of Brandenburg, 1620–1655 ===
- 1620–1623: Hebbla Eriksdotter Stålarm
- Catharina von Schnideck
- Regina Catharina von Windisch-Grätz
- 1628–1633: Brita Gylta
- 1633–1634: Ebba Leijonhufvud
- 1634–1639: Elisabeth Gyllenstierna
- 1639–1640: Christina Posse
- 1640–1649: Vacant
- 1649–1655: Görvel Posse

=== Christina, Queen of Sweden, 1632–1654 ===
During the reign of Christina, the office was often shared by several people.

- 1633–1634: Ebba Leijonhufvud
- 1634–1639: Elisabeth Gyllenstierna
- 1639–1642: Ebba Ryning (jointly with Beata Oxenstierna)
- 1639–1647: Beata Oxenstierna (jointly with Ebba Ryning)
- 1644–1648: Margareta Brahe (jointly with Kerstin Bååt)
- 1645–1650: Kerstin Bååt (jointly with Margareta Brahe)
- 1650: Barbro Fleming (jointly with Maria Sofia De la Gardie)
- 1651–1654: Maria Sofia De la Gardie (jointly with Barbro Fleming)

=== Hedvig Eleonora of Holstein-Gottorp, 1654–1715 ===
- 1655–1660: Elisabet Carlsdotter Gyllenhielm
- 1660–1664: Görwel Bååt
- 1664–1671: Görvel Posse
- 1671–1686: Occa Maria Johanna von Riperda
- 1686–1715: Märta Berendes (equivalent position at the court of the princesses in 1687–1717)

=== Ulrika Eleonora of Denmark, 1680–1693 ===
- 1680–1693: Maria Elisabeth Stenbock

=== Ulrika Eleonora, Queen of Sweden|Ulrika Eleonora, 1718–1741 ===
- 1717–1736: Katarina Ebba Horn af Åminne
- 1736–1741: Hedvig Elisabet Strömfelt (equivalent position to the Crown princess in 1744–1751)

=== Louisa Ulrika of Prussia, 1751–1782 ===
- 1751–1751: Hedvig Elisabet Strömfelt
- 1751–1754: Ulla Tessin
- 1754–1761: Ulrica Catharina Stromberg
- 1761–1765: Ulrika Juliana Gyllenstierna
- 1765–1771: Brita Stina Sparre
- 1771–1782: Fredrika Eleonora von Düben

=== Sophia Magdalena of Denmark, 1771–1813 ===
- 1771–1777: Anna Maria Hjärne
- 1777–1780: Ulrika Strömfelt
- 1780–1795: Charlotta Sparre
- 1795–1813: Hedvig Eva De la Gardie

=== Frederica of Baden, 1797–1809 ===
- 1795–1805: Hedvig Catharina Piper
- 1805–1810: Lovisa Sophia von Fersen

=== Hedvig Elisabeth Charlotte of Holstein-Gottorp, 1809–1818 ===
- 1809–1810: Lovisa Sophia von Fersen
- 1811–1818: Christina Charlotta Stjerneld
- 1818–1818: Caroline Lewenhaupt
- 1818–1818: Charlotta Aurora De Geer

=== Désirée Clary, 1823–1861 ===
- 1823–1829: Marcelle Tascher de la Pagerie
- 1829–1844: Vilhelmina Gyldenstolpe

=== Josephine of Leuchtenberg, 1844–1876 ===
- 1844–1866: Charlotta Skjöldebrand

=== Louise of the Netherlands, 1859–1872 ===
- 1859–1860: Stefanie Hamilton
- 1860–1869: Wilhelmina Bonde
- 1871–1872: Anne-Malène Wachtmeister

=== Sophia of Nassau, 1872–1907 ===
- 1872–1879: Elisabet Augusta Piper
- 1880–1890: Malvina De la Gardie
- 1890–1907: Ebba Åkerhielm

=== Victoria of Baden, 1907–1931 ===
- 1907–1908: Vacant
- 1908–1931: Augusta Lewenhaupt

=== Louise Mountbatten, 1950–1965 ===
- 1950–1956: Louise Rålamb
- 1956–1973: Astrid Rudebeck

=== Queen Silvia of Sweden (Silvia Sommerlath), 1976–present ===
- 1994–2015: Alice Trolle-Wachtmeister
- 2015–present: Kirstine von Blixen-Finecke

== See also ==
- Mistress of the Robes, British equivalent
- Camarera mayor de Palacio, Spanish equivalent
- Première dame d'honneur, French equivalent
- Surintendante de la Maison de la Reine, French equivalent
