= Rosenørn family =

Danish noble family

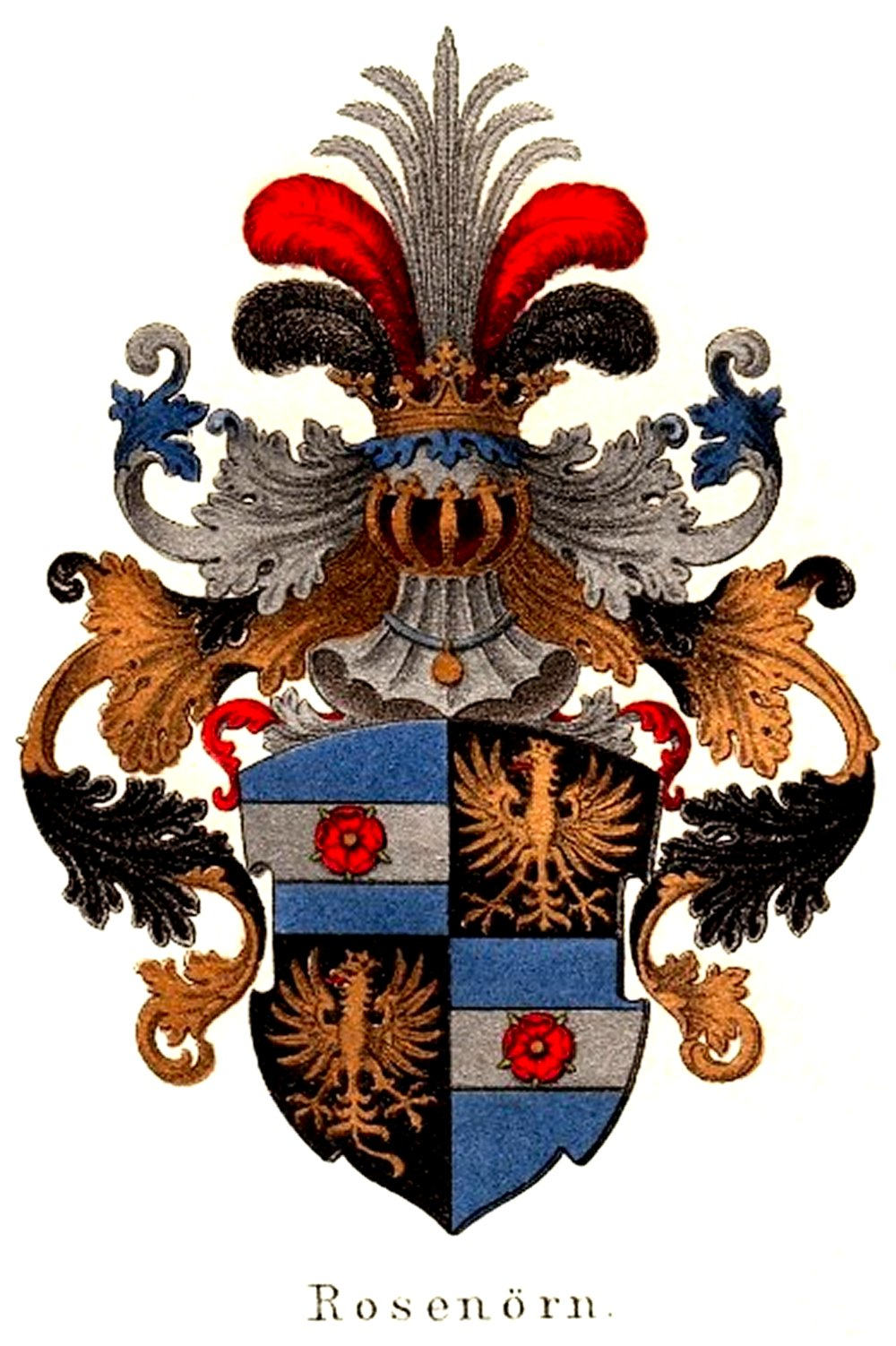
Coat of arms.

The Rosenørn family is a Danish noble family.

== History ==
Chancellery Councillor (kancelliråd) Peder Madsen (1635-1706) was the son of mayor in Randers Mads Poulsens (born 1600). In 1789, he was ennobled by letters patent under the name Rosenørn.

=== Rosenørn-Lehn ===
In 1826, Henrik Christian Rosenørn (1782-1847) was created a baron under the compound name Rosenørn-Lehn.

== Holdings ==
Manor houses which has belonged to members of the Rosenørn family include:

- Berritzgaard (1804–present)
- Dønnerup (1806–1820)
- Katholm (1724–1804)
- Orebygaard (1775–2011)

== Notable family members ==
- Ingeborg Christiane Rosenørn (1784–1859), Danish noble
- Matthias Hans Rosenørn (1814–1902), Danish politician
- Nana Rosenørn Holland Bastrup (born 1987), Danish artist
- Baroness Ulla Rosenørn-Lehn (1905–2001), Danish ballerina and actress

== See also ==
- Rosenørns Allé
