= Ilse Sophie von Platen =

German courtier

Ilse Sophie von Platen, known as Krautenmutter (11 September 1731 – 16 February 1795), was a Prussian noblewoman and courtier.

== Life ==
Ilse Sophie von Platen was born to Sophie von Platen and chamberlain Carl Friedrich von Kraut. In 1756, she married nobleman and courtier Carl Friedrich von Kraut.

Between 1748 and 1757, she served as the lady-in-waiting (Hofdame) to Sophia Dorothea of Hanover. She continued to attend court life after she was no longer formally employed and are often mentioned in court memors and dares from the period. In 1757, she had an affair with the king's brother Prince August Wilhelm. In 1758, she had an affair with the Dutch ambassador Dirk Hubert von Verelst.

== Fiction ==
Ilse Sophie von Platen is portrayed as Krautentochter in the Fünf Schlösser by Theodor Fontane.
