= Råån =

Råån Råå-ån, Kvistoftaån, Kvistofta-Råån
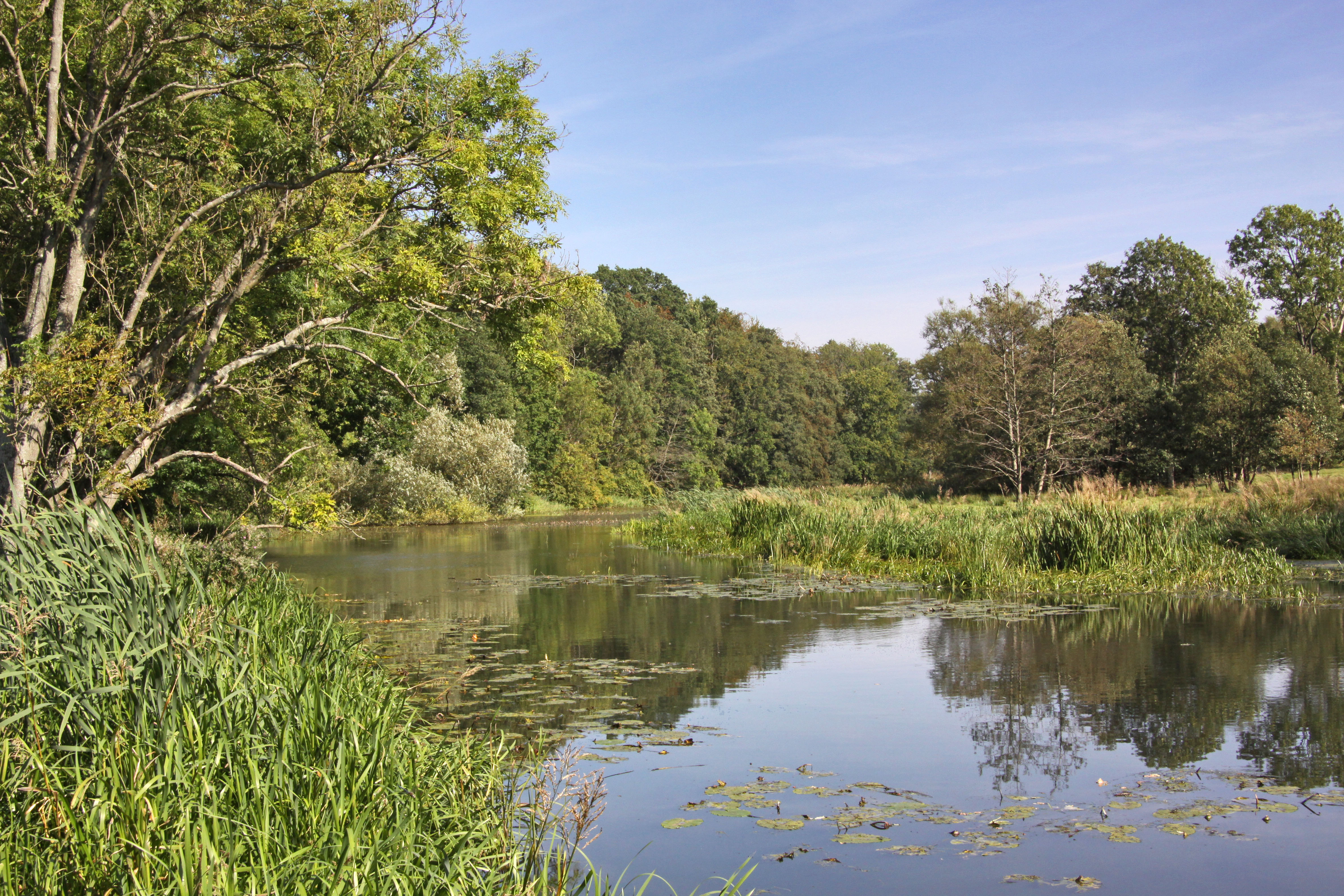
- Råån near Råå

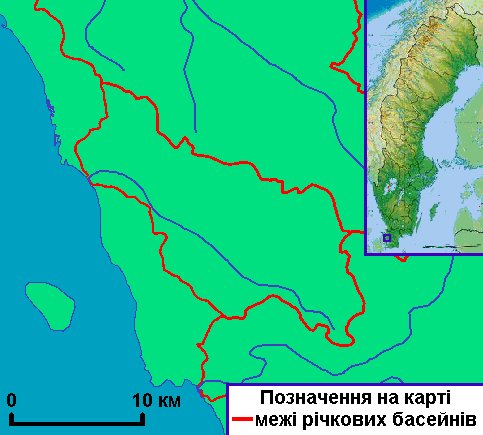
- Map of Råån's drainage basin.

Location
- Country: Sweden
- County: Skåne
- District: Svalöv, Helsingborg
- City: Helsingborg

Physical characteristics
- Source: Duveke
  - location: Svalöv Municipality
  - elevation: 70 m (230 ft)
- Mouth: Öresund
  - location: Råå, Helsingborg Municipality
  - coordinates: 55°59′30″N 12°44′35″E
  - elevation: 0 m (0 ft)
- Length: 30 km (19 mi)
- Basin size: 192.8 km^{2} (74.4 sq mi)

Basin features
- Tributaries
  - right: Tjutebäcken, Lussebäcken

Råån, formerly also known as Kvistoftaån or Kvistofta-Råån, is a river in Sweden. It is approximately 30 km long, and flows into the old fishing village Råå in Helsingborg. The river forms the geographical boundary between the plains of Helsingborg and Lund, and is surrounded by a river valley which is classified as a nature reserve and a Natura 2000 area.
