= Anne Meinstrup =

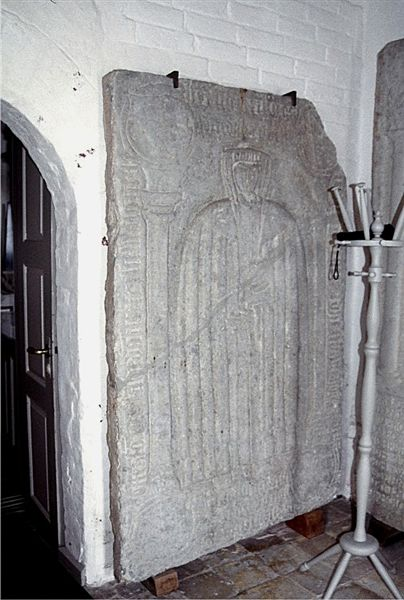
Ledger stone of Anne Meinstrup in Hornslet church

Anne Meinstrup (1475–1535) was a politically active Danish noblewoman, lady-in-waiting and county administrator.

Daughter of noble riksråd Henrik Meinstrup (d.1496) and Margrethe Christiansdatter Daa (d. 1497), she was married to noble riksråd Holger Eriksen Rosenkrantz til Boller (d. 1496) in 1491 and the noble Jørgen Ahlefeldt til Søgaard in Southern Jutland, (d. 1500) in 1497. She was made head lady-in-waiting of first Christina of Saxony in 1503 and in 1516 of the next queen Isabella of Austria. In 1507–17, she was county administrator of Højstrup. In 1517, after the death of Dyveke Sigbritsdatter, she was replaced as chief lady in waiting to the queen by Sigbrit Willoms, mother of Dyveke. She criticized the relationship between king Christian II of Denmark and Dyveke, and lived in exile in Lübeck in 1517–23. In 1526–33, she was again the first lady-in-waiting of the queen, this time to Sophie of Pomerania.

She was an influential person in Denmark. In 1511, she was rumoured to have an affair with a court noble. During the Count's Feud 1534–36, she was an ally of Count Christopher of Oldenburg, who granted her the county of Højstrup and Sæbygaard i Løve Herred (1534). Her son, however, belonged to the opposite side. At the public council of Ringsted Landsting 20 January 1535, she was summoned as one of the delegates by the count. After a sharp speech, she was lynched by the Count's soldiers.

During the war, her murder was frequently used in the propaganda. At the amnesty in Copenhagen of 1536, her murderers were excluded from the amnesty and executed.
