= Maria Golitzyna =

Russian noble, courtier and philanthropist

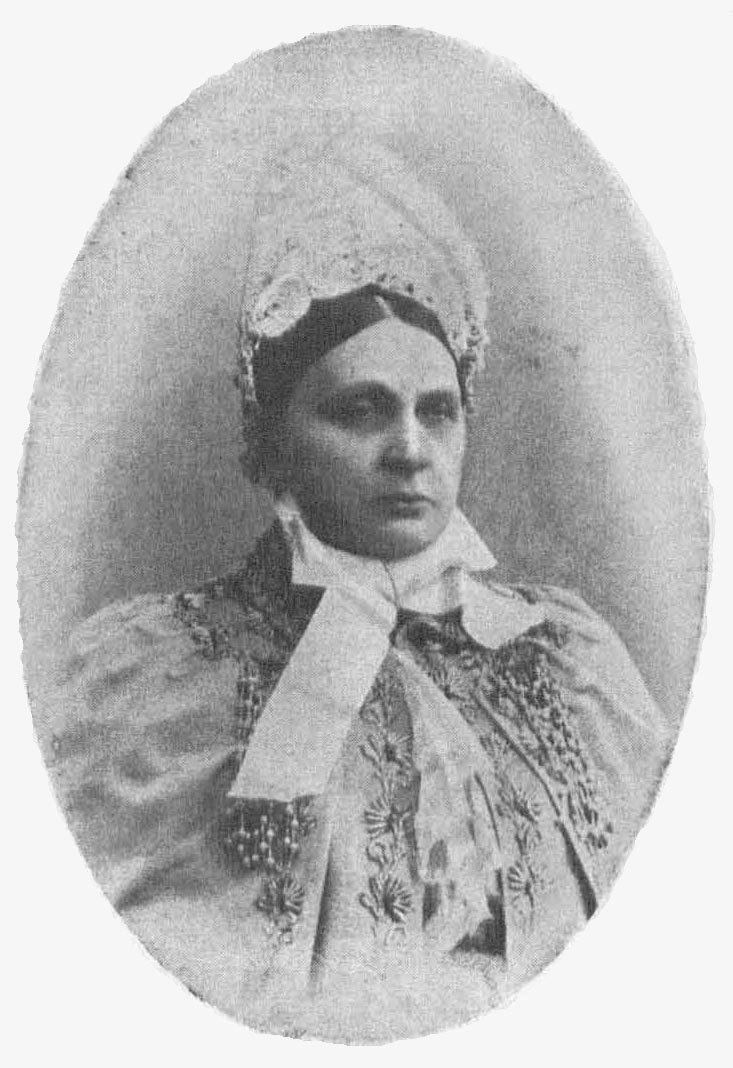
Maria Golitsyna

Princess Maria Mikhailovna Golitzyna (Russian: Мария Михайловна Голицина; 1834–1910) was a Russian noble, courtier and philanthropist. She served as Ober-Hofmeisterin (Chief Court Mistress) to Empress Alexandra Feodorovna of Russia from 1894 until 1910.

== Life ==
She was the daughter of general lieutenant Michail Vasiljevitj Pashkov and Maria Baranova Trofimovna. In 1857, she married prince Vladimir Dmitrievich Golitsyn (1815-1888). She had one child, Maria Vladimirovna Golitsyna (1860-1933), who at one point served as maid of honour.

Golitzyna was made a dame of the Order of Saint Catherine in 1879. She served as deputy chair of the prestigious Patriotic Society in 1896-1910. Maria Golitzyna is described by contemporaries as an imposing character and as an extreme reactionary conservative, opponent to all forms of liberal reforms of the autocratic monarchy. In 1894 she was appointed to the post of senior lady-in-waiting to the new empress, with the responsibility of all the female employees of the empress' court, which had been selected by Dowager Empress Maria Feodorovna.

According to general A. A. Mosolov, no one was better suited to supervise the ladies-in-waiting: "it would be hard to find a lady better suited than the princess Golitsyna to personify the high rank of mistress of the robes... She had a well developed feeling for anything not belonging to etiquette." Baroness Sophie Buxhoeveden described her:

"Princess Marie Mikhailovna Galitzin, was a wonderful type of old Russia, belonging by birth and marriage to the greatest families of the country. She was a grande dame of the old school, and even her outward appearance was typical of a bygone age. [...] Princess Galitzin, notwithstanding her overawing manner - she struck terror into the hearts of all the debutantes, at whom she glared through her horn glasses-was kind and straightforward. She was courteous in spite of her brusque manner, but was no diplomat and could not do much to help the young Empress, to whom she became deeply attached. Although the Empress was rather afraid of her to begin with, she afterwards loved her dearly. When Princess Galitzin died in 1910 the Empress felt her loss greatly, and said to Princess E. N. Obolensky : "J'ai perdu la plus grande amie que famis en Russie. Meme dans toute la famille, personne ne m' était aussi proche."

She carried all the children of the last empress to their baptism.

She was succeeded in her court office by Elizaveta Alekseevna Narishkina (1838-1928).

Court offices
Preceded by Anna Stroganoff	Ober-Hofmeisterin to the Empress of Russia; 1894–1910	Succeeded by Elizaveta Narishkina
