= Louise Bille-Brahe =

Danish courtier

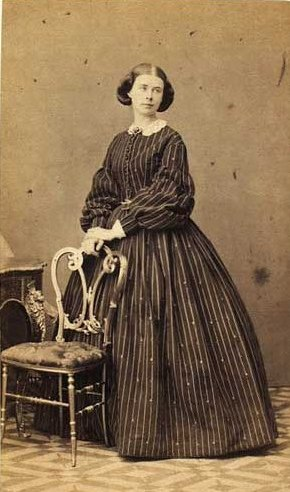
Louise Bille-Brahe

Louise Bille-Brahe (1830–1910) was a Danish courtier; Overhofmesterinde (Mistress of the Robes) to the queen of Denmark, Louise of Hesse-Kassel, from 1888 to 1898, and to the next queen of Denmark, Louise of Sweden, from 1906 to 1910.

Born to baron Carl Hochschild and Emilia Catharina Oxholm, she married diplomat count Henrik Bille-Brahe in 1851.
