= Ida Marie Bille =

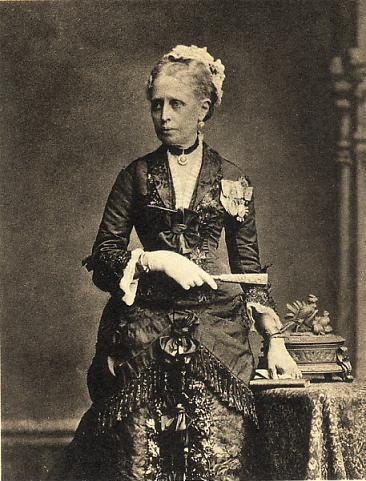
Ida Marie Bille

Ida Marie Bille (2 August 1822 - 7 March 1902) was a Danish courtier; Overhofmesterinde (Mistress of the Robes) to the queen of Denmark, Louise of Hesse-Kassel, from 1864 to 1876.

Born to count Preben Bille-Brahe and Johanne Caroline Wilhelmine Falbe and sister of Johan Christian Bille-Brahe, she married diplomat Christian Høyer Bille in 1844. She was appointed chief lady in waiting to the queen in 1864. She retired in 1876 and was granted a pension at Vallø Stift.
