= Agrippina Volkonskaia =

Russian aristocrat and courtier (d. 1732)

Agrippina Petrovna Volkonskaia (d. 1732), was a Russian courtier. She was the Ober-Hofmeisterin of Catherine I of Russia. She was known for her participation in many political intrigues at court. In 1727, she was the leading figure of a circle of prominent people in a conspiracy with the purpose of bringing about the downfall of Alexander Danilovich Menshikov, but she failed and was exiled.
