= Hélene Kotchoubey =

Russian noblewoman (1812–1888)

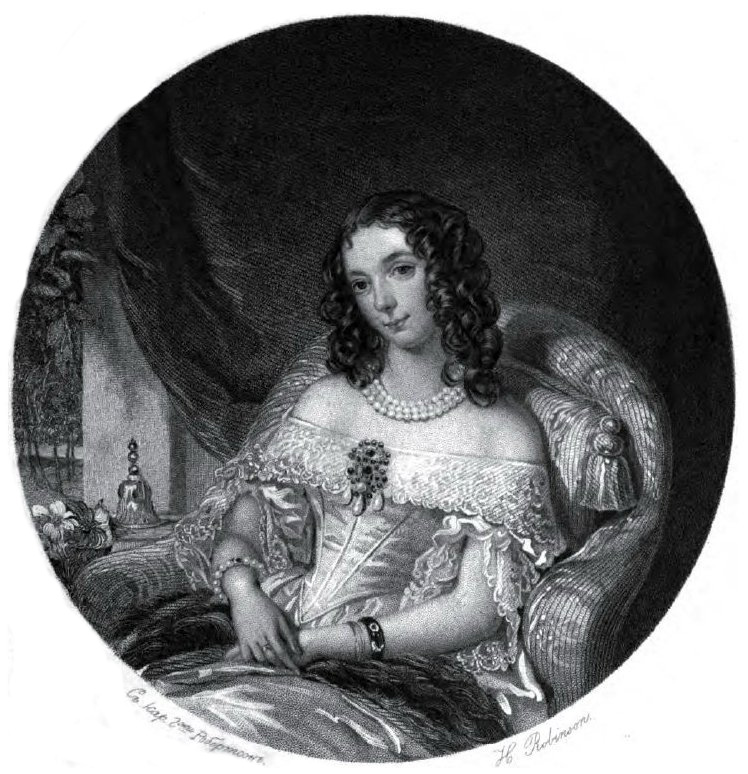
Hélene Kotchoubey

Hélene Pavlovna Kotchoubey (Russian: Елена Павловна Кочубей}, née Bibikova (Russian: Бибикова) (1812-1888) was a Russian noblewoman and court official. She served as Ober-Hofmeisterin (Mistress of the Robes) or senior lady-in-waiting to empress Maria Feodorovna (Dagmar of Denmark) in 1881–1888.

== Life ==
She was the daughter of Pavel Gavrilovitj Bibikov (1784–1812) and Elizaveta Andrejevna Bibikova, and was the stepdaughter of Alexander von Benckendorff. She married prince Ėsper Aleksandrovič Belosel'skij-Belozerskij, and secondly in 1847 to prince Vasilij Viktorovitj Kotjubej (1812-1850).

She served as lady-in-waiting before she succeeded Julia Kurakina as senior lady-in-waiting in 1881, and was succeeded by Anna Stroganoff.

Court offices
Preceded by Julia Kurakina	Ober-Hofmeisterin to the Empress of Russia; 1881–1888	Succeeded by Anna Stroganoff
