= Anna Jönsdotter =

Mother of Jöran Persson

Anna Jönsdotter, also known as Anna Pehrsönernas moder (died 18/21 September 1568, Stockholm), was the mother of the Swedish politician Jöran Persson, the powerful adviser of king Eric XIV of Sweden. She was rumored to be a witch, and considered to have wielded a significant and disliked influence over her son and the affairs of state. She has been referred to by the name "Anna Pehrsönernas moder" (literary: 'Anna, Mother of the sons of Per').

== First vicar's wife ==
Anna was a house keeper to the Catholic priest Curatus Petrus (Per Joensson). Curatus Petrus is mentioned in his office in 1526, when he acted on the behalf of king Gustav Vasa during negotiations in Sala.

Prior to the Protestant Reformation, it was commonly accepted and well known in Sweden that a Catholic priest had a sexual relationship to his house keeper, and these house keepers were referred to as "Red-Deja" or "Forssia". She had two sons, Jöran and Christern.

After the Swedish Reformation in 1527, the priests were expected to marry their mistresses, and Anna belonged to the last "Fossia" and the very first vicar's wives when Petrus married her in about 1530. Her husband later lived as a merchant in Stockholm, but returned to the priesthood in 1548, when he was employed in Strängnäs.

== Alleged witch ==
Anna as well as her spouse was well regarded by king Gustav Vasa. Sometime in the 1550s, Anna was appointed housekeeper or Mistress of the Linen at the Royal Strömsholm Palace. After the death of Gustav I in 1560, she kept her position at the palace when it was made residence of the court of the queen dowager Catherine.

Her son Jöran was appointed adviser of the new monarch, Eric XIV, and often considered as the country's real regent during the 1560s. Her other son, Christern Persson (d. 1567), was also employed in the king's council. The two brothers became eminently unpopular, and Anna herself was rumored by the propaganda to influence them and affect their rule through magic.

== Death ==
In 1567, Jöran Persson was deposed and imprisoned during the illness of Erik XIV. However, he was reinstated when the king recovered. This reinstatement increased the hostility against king Eric, and in 1568, the king was deposed. Jöran Persson was arrested and executed brutally by the new king, John III. The wife of Persson, Anna Andersdotter, was arrested, and according to unconfirmed sources she was accused of sorcery. Whatever the case, she managed to escape and was given protection by Duke Charles.

In connection to the process against her son, John III had Anna Pehrsönernas moder arrested. When her son was judged to be executed, John III ordered that she be taken to the place of execution together with her son, and executed with him. It is commonly claimed that she had been judged for sorcery. However, there does not seem to be much documentation about this alleged witch trial. Anna was taken to her execution on horseback. On the way to the execution, however, she fell off the horse and broke her neck, either by simply falling accidentally or by deliberately throwing herself off the horse. There are some different versions of this event. According to some sources, after the execution of her son, a pike was put through her back, and her corpse was buried without ceremonies on the ground of the execution place beneath the corpse of her son.

== See also ==
- Sigbrit Willoms
