= Elizaveta Naryshkina =

Russian noblewoman, court official and memoirist

Elizaveta Naryshkina (Russian: Елизавета "Зизи" Алексеевна Нарышкина; née Kurakin, Russian: Куракина; 1838–1928) was a Russian noblewoman, court official and memoirist. She served as ober-hofmeisterin to Empress Alexandra Feodorovna (Alix of Hesse) from 1910 until 1917.

== Life ==
She was the elder daughter of Prince Alexis Kurakin and Princess Julia Golitsyn. She married Anatoly Dimitevich Naryshkin (1829–1883). They had two children, a son Kyril (1868–1924) who was a General, and a daughter Vera (1874–1951) who married the Governor of Yaroslavl, Count Dimitri Nikolaevich Tatishchev (1867–1919).

=== Court career ===
She was appointed chief lady-in-waiting to empress Alexandra in succession to Maria Golitzyna, who died in 1910. As such, she was the first in rank of female office holders of the empress household and responsible for the ladies-in-waiting.

During the World War I, she remained in service at Tsarskole Selo with the empress along with the ladies-in-waiting Princess Sonia Orbeliani (died 1915), O. E. Butzow, Sophie Buxhoeveden and Anastasia Hendrikova.

=== Revolution ===
After the Russian Revolution, she remained during the house arrest of the former tsar and empress at Tsarskoye Selo. On 21 March, when the household staff where informed by the government that they would have to choose by leaving or remaining and henceforth be submitted to the conditions of house arrest themselves, she chose to remain. At one point, Narishkina unsuccessfully suggested to Alexandra that she and Nikolai could escape without their children (who were ill and could not be moved) who they could leave in the care of Narishkina, who would then bring the children to them when the children had recovered from their illness.

In 8 April, Kerensky informed them that there were plans to separate Alexandra from the rest of the family for political reasons. Narishkina, according to Sophie Buxhoeveden, protested and managed to persuade him to abstain from this, as it would be cruel to separate the children from their mother when they were ill. Instead, Kerensky chose to simply keep the former emperor on a different floor of the palace until Alexandra had been questioned by him on her political involvement (an interview which took place on 25 April).

Ultimately, Narishkina did not accompany Alexandra to Siberia, as she fell ill with bronchitis and left for health reasons on 27 May. She lived for a long time in a peasants house on her former estate in the Tver district, until she managed to travel to the frontier with the help of her former maid and, from the frontier, out of Russia to Denmark and from there to her Tastichev grandson and her nephew Prince Kurakin in Paris.

== Memoirs ==
She published her memoirs: Under three tsars: the memoirs of the lady-in-waiting, Elizabeth Narishkin-Kurakin (1931).

Court offices
Preceded by Maria Golitzyna	Ober-Hofmeisterin to the Empress of Russia; 1910–1917	Succeeded by Office abolished
