= Sophie von Kameke =

Sophie von Kameke née von Brünnow (1675-1749) was a Prussian courtier. She served as oberhofmeisterin to the queen of Prussia, Sophia Dorothea of Hanover.

Sophie de Kameke was appointed oberhofmeisterin to the queen, which made her responsible for the queen's household and ladies-in-waiting and the highest female court office holder. As such she is frequently mentioned in contemporary memoirs and diaries, notably that of Wilhelmine of Prussia, Margravine of Brandenburg-Bayreuth, and participated in several famous events at court.

In 1723, the queen suddenly gave birth unexpectedly, without having been aware of her pregnancy. The fact that she had been unaware of her pregnancy caused a rumor that she had in fact tried to hide it, which caused the king to suspect her for adultery, and he had to be prevented to beat her by Sophie de Kameke, who held his arm and told him "if he had only come there to kill his wife, he had better have kept away." The king questioned the physician Stahl, his regimental surgeon Holzendorf and Sophie de Kameke about the queen's suspected adultery, upon which de Kameke told him that "if he were not her king she would strangle him on the spot" for his accusation, which resulted in him making an apology to the queen and dismissing the affair. In 1730, it was Kameke who the king gave the task to inform the queen of the unsuccessful escape attempt of her son the crown prince from Prussia.
