= Julia Kurakina =

Russian noblewoman

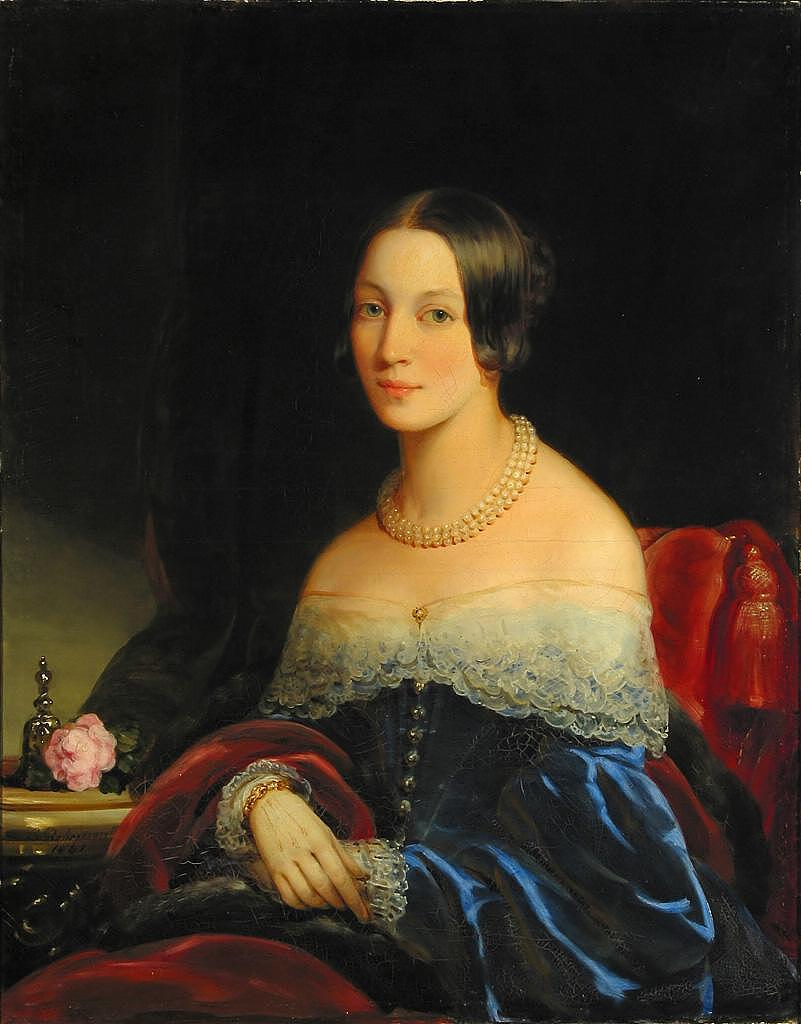
Julia Kurakina by Christina Robertson

Julia Kurakina (Russian: Юлия Куракина; 1814–1881) was a Russian noblewoman and royal court official. She served as Ober-Hofmeisterin (Mistress of the Robes) or senior lady-in-waiting to empress Maria Feodorovna (Dagmar of Denmark) in 1866–1881.

== Life ==
She was the daughter of Fjodor Sergeevich Golitsyn and Anna Alexandrovna Prozorovskaya, and was the granddaughter of Sergei Fedorovich Golitsyn. She married the diplomat prince Alexei Borisovich Kurakin (1809—1872) in 1835.

She became senior lady-in-waiting to Maria Feodorovna in 1866. She remained in office after Maria Feodorovna became empress in 1881, but died later that same year, and was succeeded by Hélene Kotchoubey.

Court offices
Preceded by	Ober-Hofmeisterin to the Empress of Russia; 1881–1881	Succeeded by Hélene Kotchoubey
