= Sigbrit Willoms =

Danish-Norwegian politician

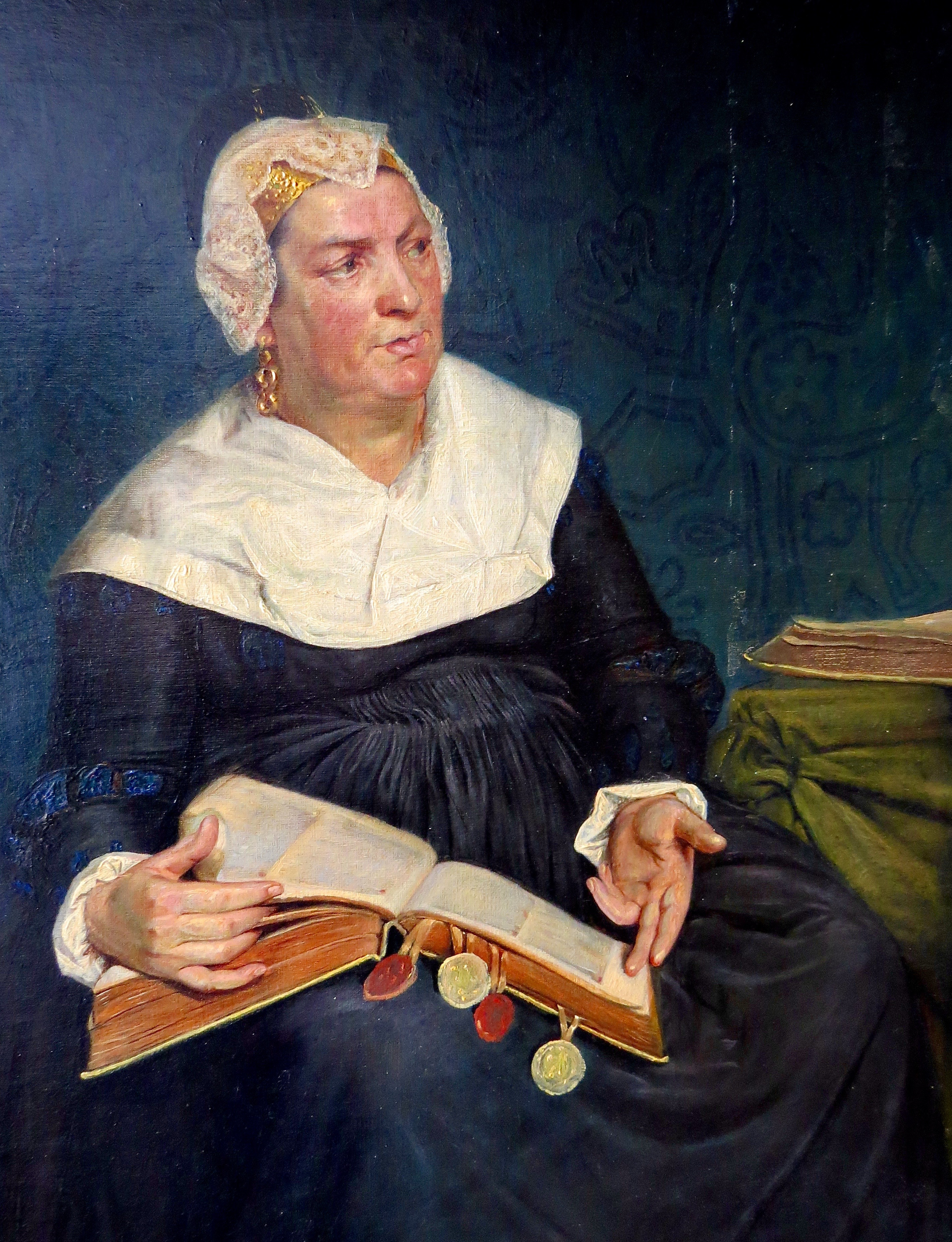
Willoms as imagined by Kristian Zahrtmann in Sigbrit gennemgår toldregnskaberne med Christian II (Sigbrit Reviews Tax Accounts with Christian II), 1873.

Sigbrit Willoms (also spelled Villoms or Villums), (possible date of death 1532), was a Danish-Norwegian politician from Amsterdam, mother to the mistress of King Christian II of Denmark, Dyveke Sigbritsdatter, and advisor and de facto minister of finance for the king between 1519 and 1523. She was never given an official position, but was addressed by the title Mother Sigbrit (Danish: Mor Sigbrit).

== Early life and family ==
Sigbrit Willoms was born into a merchant family from Amsterdam. She was educated in counting, reading and writing in Low German, the business language of Northern Europe. She was also tutored in contemporary herbal medicine. One of her two brothers, Dionysius Villoms, was similarly trained and was an apothecary.

Until the 15th century, German merchants from the Hanseatic States had dominated trade in the Nordic region, but in the mid 1400s, Dutch merchants, including her family, entered into competition with the Germans. At an unknown date, she moved to Bergen, Norway, an important trading center. She is known to have lived there in 1507 along with her brothers and daughter.

She is believed to have had two children. Little is known about her presumed son, Reynold Sigbritssøn, though her daughter Dyveke Sigbritsdatter gained note as the mistress of King Christian II of Denmark. Willoms is believed to have been married, as none of her children are called illegitimate. However, little record of her husband exists, though he may haven been named Nicolaas. She did not use her husband's surname, as she used the patronymic Willoms or Villomsdatter instead. By the time she moved to Bergen in 1507, her husband had likely died.

In Bergen, Willoms was likely involved in a variety of business ventures, including a pastry stall and an inn. In 1507, the close confidant of Crown Prince Christian, Erik Valkendorf, met Sigbrit and Dyveke at a stand in the market where they sold pastries. Valkendorf told the prince about Dyveke's beauty, and the prince invited mother and daughter to a ball, after which Dyveke, with the consent of Sigbrit, became Christian's mistress.

== Life in Denmark ==
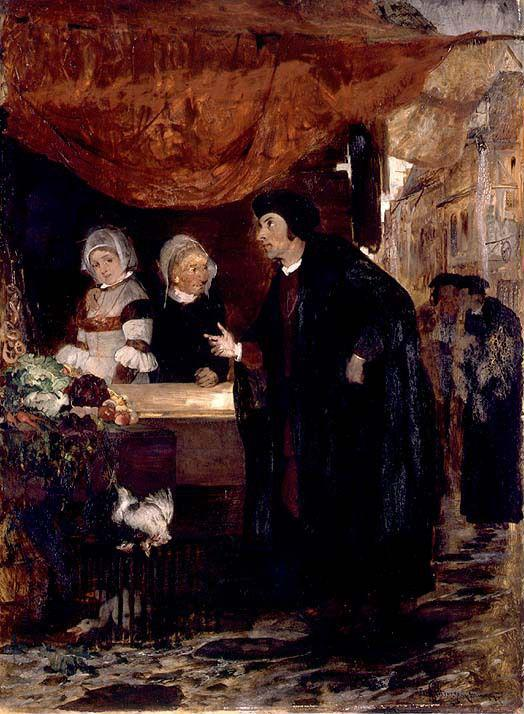
Sigbrit (center) and her daughter as Eilif Peterssen imagined them in 1876.

In 1513, when Christian became king of Denmark, mother and daughter moved with the king to Copenhagen. Her brother, Dionysius Villoms, was named apothecary of the king, her other brother having been appointed to the office of lensmand at Bergenhus the year prior. Her influence over the king became greater after the death of her daughter in 1517, and she was made his political adviser and confidant. In 1517, Sigbrit was appointed to succeed her former antagonist Anne Meinstrup to the office of Hofmesterinde to the Queen's Household, as well as put in charge of the Household of the Crown Prince Hans as royal governess.

From 1519 onward, she was accounted the most politically influential person in Denmark after the king himself. The king put her in charge of the customs office and the royal treasury, in effect making her the de facto royal treasurer and Minister of Finance: she was however never formally called minister, but instead given the title of Mother Sigbrit, at that time normally an honorary title for the female head of a family.

Being a bourgeoise, she was known for forwarding the interests of the merchant classes and the interests of the cities in general. In 1522, she instigated a new law about hygiene in the capital city of Copenhagen, where people were told to have their houses cleaned every week. She was unpopular with the nobility, and the target of public slander: because of her herbal knowledge, her critics spread rumors that she was a witch, and she was blamed for being the person behind the Stockholm Bloodbath in 1520.

== Later life and death ==
When King Christian was driven out of Denmark in 1523, Sigbrit followed him to the Netherlands, where Christian asked for aid from his brother-in-law, the emperor. Little is known with certainty of what became of her in the Netherlands. According to one source, she managed to escape the hostile environment in Denmark by being smuggled onto Christian II's fleet inside a coffin. Once in the Netherlands, emperor Charles V allegedly made the condition that Christian was to get rid of Sigbrit, which Christian agreed to. She is said to have hidden in the Netherlands and secretly had contact with Christian.

The date and circumstances of her death are unconfirmed. In 1532, a woman was detained in a prison in the Netherlands, who is believed to have been Sigbrit. The emperor wished to have this prisoner executed for witchcraft, though it is not known what became of her.

== See also ==
- Anna Pehrsönernas moder, a 16th century woman with a similar position in Sweden.
