= Anna Stroganoff =

Russian noblewoman, philanthropist and court official

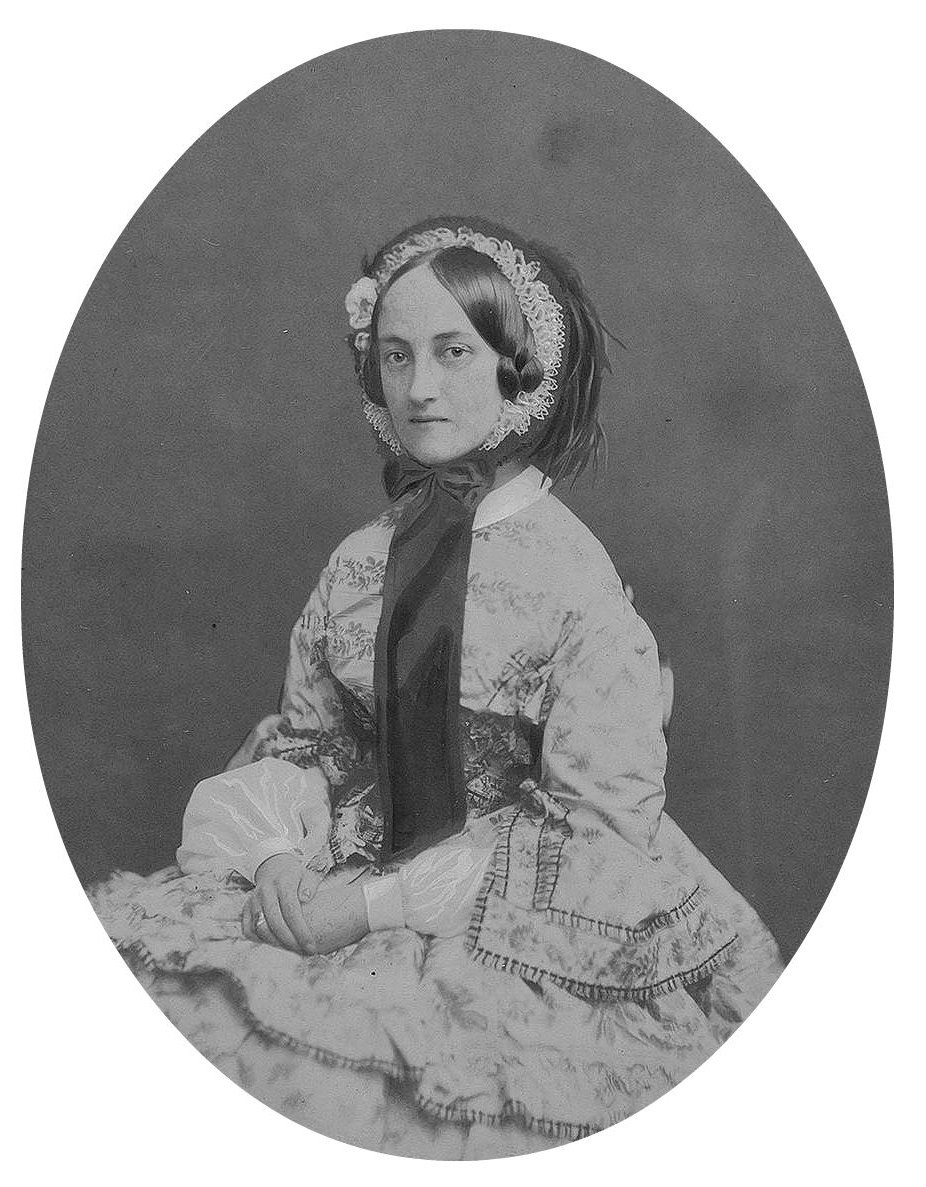
Anna Stroganoff

Anna Dmitrievna Stroganoff (Russian: Анна Дмитриевна Строганова), née Buturlina (Russian: Бутурлина) (1825-1906) was a Russian noblewoman, philanthropist and court official. She served as Ober-Hofmeisterin (Chief Court Mistress) or senior lady-in-waiting to empress Maria Feodorovna (Dagmar of Denmark) from 1888.

== Life ==
She was the daughter of senator Dmitry Petrovich Buturlin and lady-in-waiting Elizabeth Mikhailovna Komburlei. She married count Pavel Sergeevich Stroganoff (1823-1911).

She served as maid-of-honour from 1843 until her marriage, was promoted to lady-in-waiting after her marriage in 1851, and succeeded Helene Kotchobey as senior lady-in-waiting in 1888.

Court offices
Preceded by Hélene Kotchoubey	Ober-Hofmeisterin to the Empress of Russia	Succeeded by Maria Golitzyna
