= Tatyana Borisovna Golitsyna =

Russian courtier

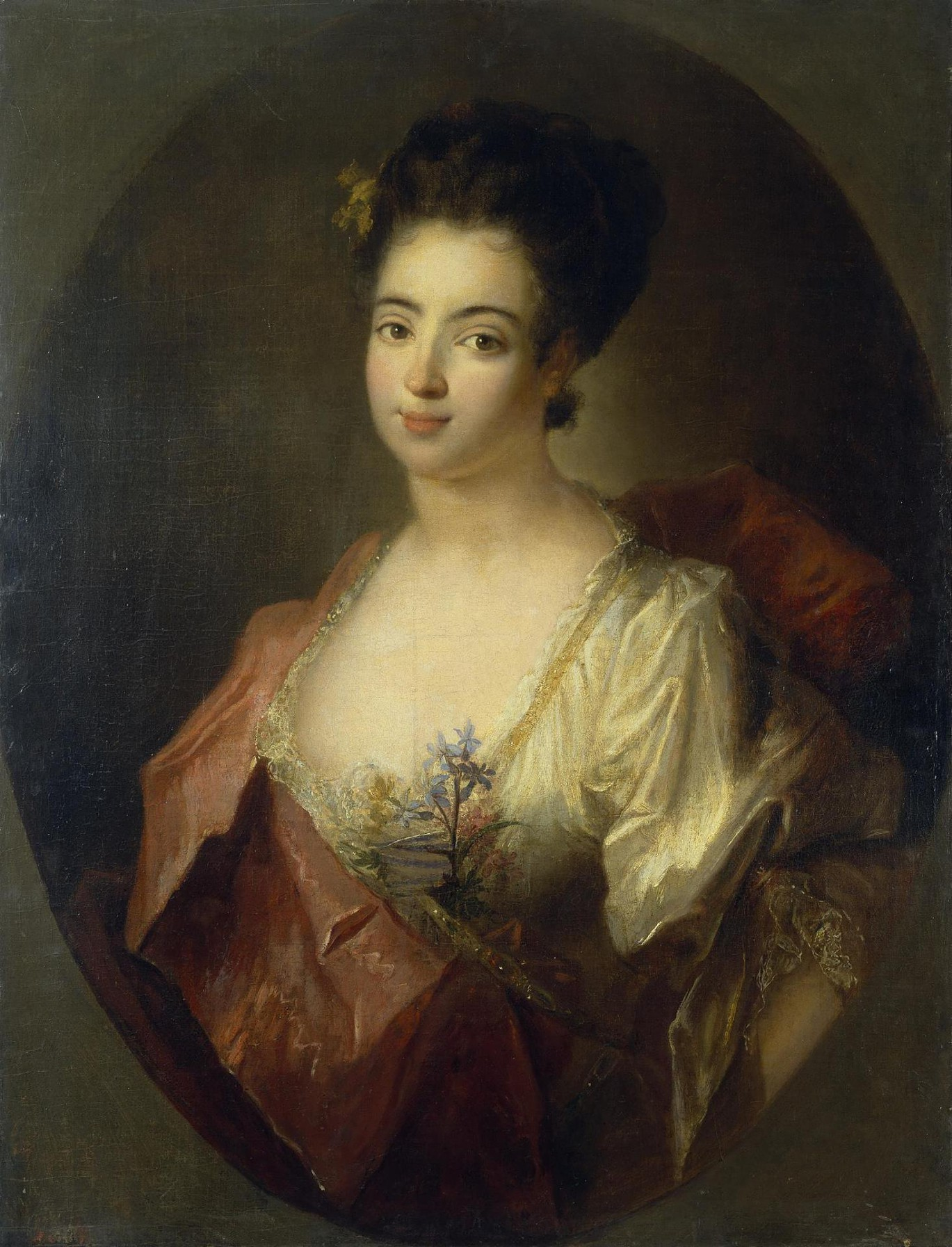
T.B.Kurakina by Antoine Pesne (Hermitage)

Tatyana Borisovna Golitsyna (Russian: Татьяна Борисовна Голицына; née Kurakina [Куракина]; 1696–1757) was a Russian courtier.

She was the daughter of prince Boris Kurakin and K. F. Lopukhina, and the cousin of Alexei Petrovich, Tsarevich of Russia. She married Mikhail Mikhailovich Golitsyn (Field Marshal) in 1716.

She served as senior lady-in-waiting to empress Anna of Russia in 1730–1740, and had the same office in the court of empress Elizabeth of Russia in 1740–1750. As such she played a major role in the Imperial court of the time.
