= Christiane Henriette Louise Juel =

Danish noblewoman and courtier

Christiane Henriette Louise Juel née von Schleinitz (24 September 1709 – 12 August 1756) was a Danish noblewoman and courtier.

She served as maid of honor to the queen, Sophie Magdalene of Brandenburg-Kulmbach, and married the queen's courtier Carl Juel on 15 August 1738. She and her spouse were powerful central figures at the Danish royal court and their careers there took place in parallel: in 1742–43 they served as chamberlain and chief lady-in-waiting to Princess Louise of Denmark, and in 1743 they were appointed to the same position for the new crown princess, Louise of Great Britain. They kept their offices to Louise after she became queen, and were appointed to the same offices to the next queen, Juliana Maria of Brunswick-Wolfenbüttel, in 1752.

In 1754, the Juel couple were ousted from the royal court, reportedly because they were considered a threat by the powerful Johann Hartwig Ernst von Bernstorff, who disliked the great confidence they had acquired with the queen. She died on 12 August 1756 at Valdemar's Castle.
