= Sophia Dorothea of Hanover =

Queen in Prussia from 1713 to 1740

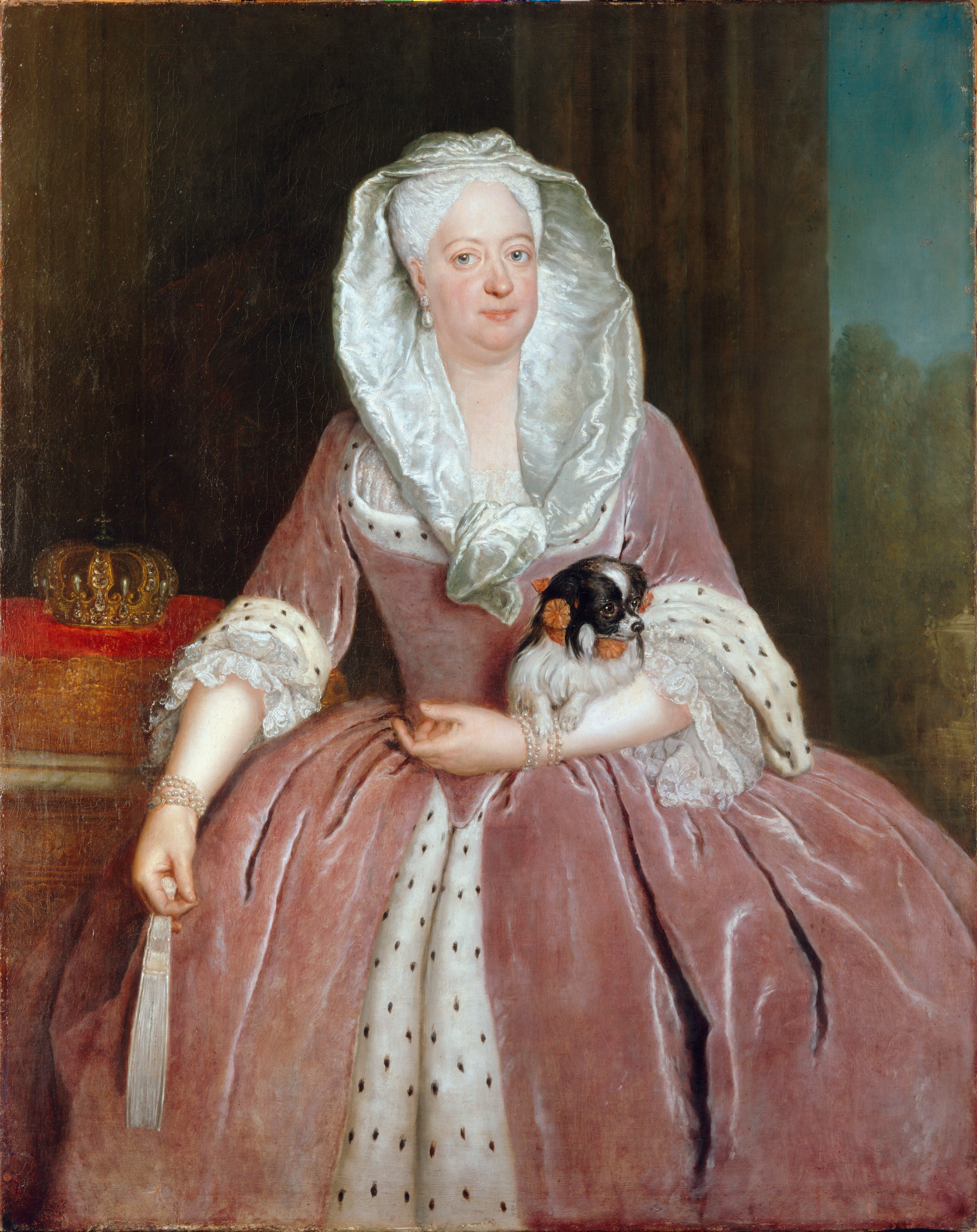
- Portrait by Antoine Pesne, 1737

Queen consort in Prussia Electress consort of Brandenburg
- Tenure: 25 February 1713 – 31 May 1740
- Born: 16 March 1687; Hanover, Principality of Calenberg
- Died: 28 June 1757 (aged 70); Monbijou Palace, Berlin
- Burial: Berlin Cathedral
- Spouse: Frederick William I of Prussia (m. 1706; died 1740)
- Issue: Prince Frederick Louis; Wilhelmine, Margravine of Brandenburg-Bayreuth; Prince Frederick William; Frederick II of Prussia; Princess Charlotte; Frederica Louise, Margravine of Brandenburg-Ansbach; Philippine Charlotte, Duchess of Brunswick-Wolfenbüttel; Prince Louis; Sophia Dorothea, Margravine of Brandenburg-Schwedt; Louisa Ulrika, Queen of Sweden; Prince Augustus William; Anna Amalia, Abbess of Quedlinburg; Prince Henry; Prince Augustus Ferdinand
- House: Hanover
- Father: George I of Great Britain
- Mother: Sophia Dorothea of Celle

Sophia Dorothea of Hanover (26 March [O.S. 16 March] 1687 – 28 June 1757; German: Sophie Dorothea von Hannover) was Queen in Prussia and Electress of Brandenburg during the reign of her husband, King Frederick William I, from 1713 to 1740. She was the mother of Frederick the Great (King Frederick II of Prussia); subsequent Prussian and then German monarchs were descended from her other son Prince Augustus William of Prussia.

At the time of Sophia's birth, her father was merely the son of a German prince, Ernest Augustus, Duke of Brunswick-Lüneburg. It was not until 1701 that the Act of Settlement placed him, through his mother, in line to inherit the throne of Great Britain. Sophia was 27 years of age, and had already become the Queen in Prussia and a mother of many children by the time her father became King George I of Great Britain in 1714.

== Life ==
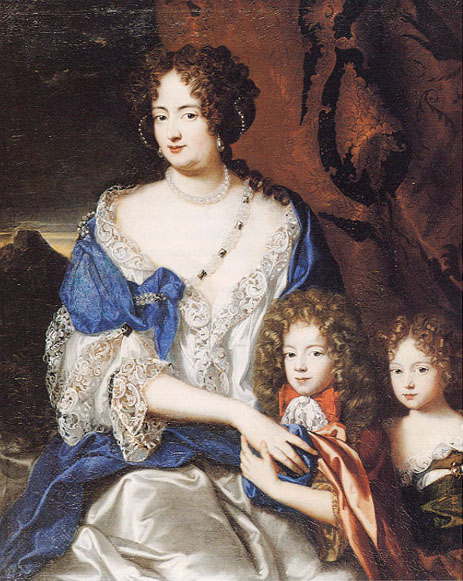
Sophia Dorothea (far right) with her mother and brother, by Jacques Vaillant, c. 1692

Sophia Dorothea was born on 16 March 1687 (O.S.), in Hanover. She was the only daughter of George Louis of Hanover, later King George I of Great Britain, and his wife, Sophia Dorothea of Celle. She was detested by her elder brother, King George II of Great Britain.

After the divorce and imprisonment of her mother, she was raised in Hanover under the supervision of her paternal grandmother, Sophia of Hanover, and educated by her Huguenot teacher Madame de Sacetot.

=== Marriage ===
Sophia Dorothea married her cousin (her father's sister's son), Crown Prince Frederick William of Prussia, heir apparent to the Prussian throne, on 28 November 1706. They had met as children when Frederick William had spent some time in Hanover under the care of their grandmother, Sophia of Hanover, and though Sophia Dorothea disliked him, Frederick William had reportedly felt an attraction to her early on.

When a marriage was to be arranged for Frederick William, he was given two alternatives: Princess Ulrika Eleonora of Sweden or Sophia Dorothea of Hanover. The Swedish match was preferred by his father, who wished to form a matrimonial alliance with Sweden, and thus the official Albrecht Konrad Finck von Finckenstein was sent to Stockholm under the pretext of an adjustment of the disputes regarding Pomerania, but in reality to observe the princess before issuing formal negotiations: Frederick William, however, preferred Sophia Dorothea and successfully tasked Finck with making such a deterring report of Ulrika Eleonora to his father that he would encounter less opposition when he informed his father of his choice. A marriage alliance between Prussia and Hanover was regarded as a noncontroversial choice by both courts and the negotiations were swiftly conducted. In order for Sophia Dorothea to make as good an impression as possible in Berlin, her grandmother, Electress Sophia, commissioned her niece Elizabeth Charlotte, Princess of the Palatinate to procure her trousseau in Paris. Her bridal paraphernalia attracted great attention and was referred to as the greatest of any German princess yet.

The wedding by proxy took place in Hanover on 28 November 1706, and she arrived in Berlin on 27 November, where she was welcomed by her groom and his family outside of the city gates and before making her entrance into the capital. Thereafter followed a second wedding, the stately torch-dance, and six weeks of banquets and balls.

=== Crown Princess in Prussia ===
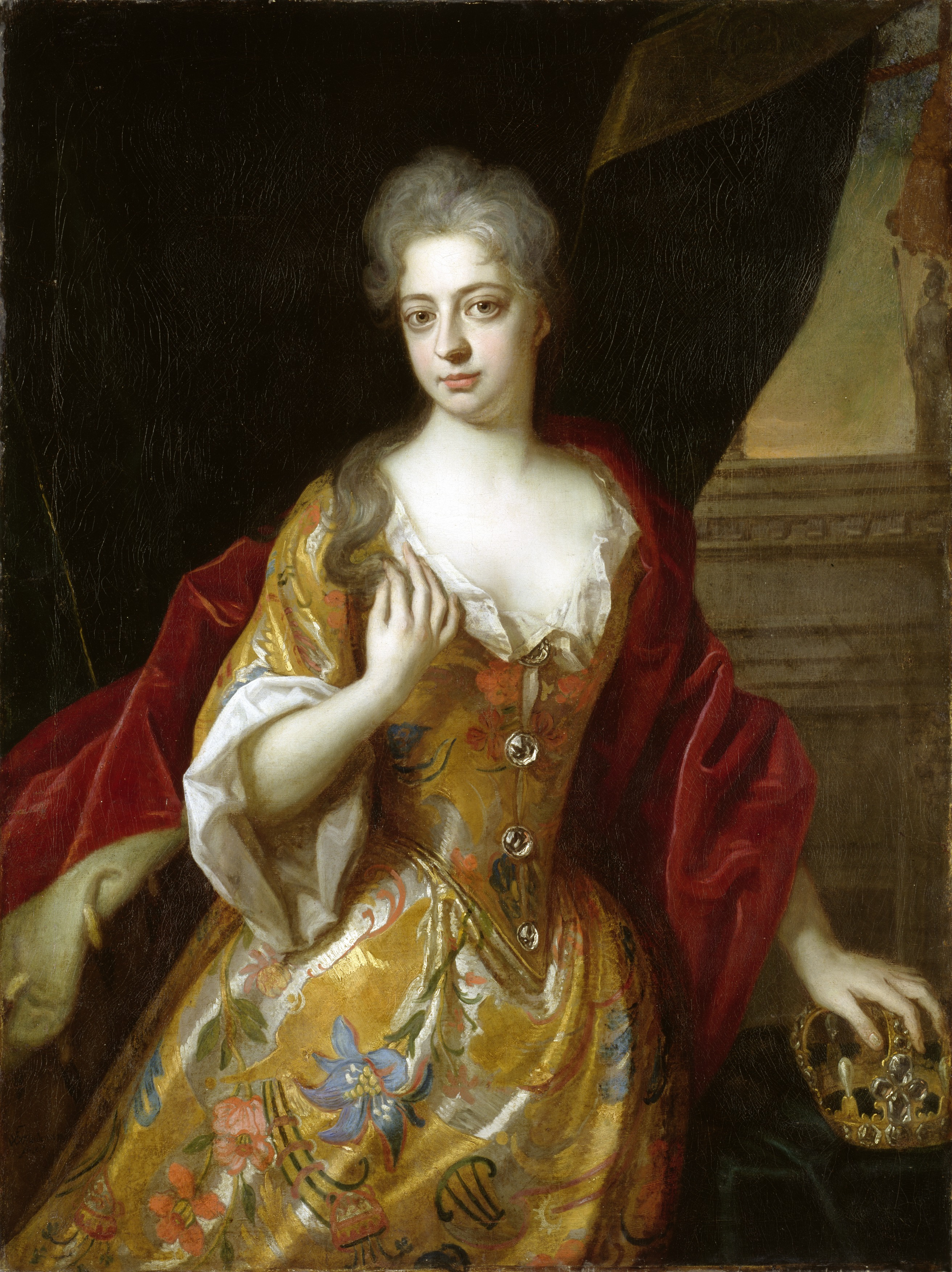
Sophia Dorothea as crown princess by Friedrich Wilhelm Weidemann, 1710

Sophia Dorothea was described as tall, with a beautiful slender figure, graceful and dignified with big blue eyes. Though not regarded as strictly beautiful, she was seen as quite attractive at the time of her marriage and described as charming in her manners, making a good impression in Berlin. Frederick William often called her "Fiekchen".

Sophia Dorothea and Frederick William differed from each other in every aspect and the marriage suffered as a result. Sophia Dorothea was interested in art, science, literature and fashion, while Frederick William was described as an unpolished, uneducated and spartan military man with rough manners. Though he was never unfaithful to her, he was unable to win her affection. One of the most important differences between them was that Sophia Dorothea, unlike her husband, loved entertainment, something he regarded to be frivolous. Frederick William contemplated divorcing her the same year they married and, judging by her letters, accused her of not wanting to be married to him. According to Morgenstern, "He had none of that astonishing complaisance by which lovers, whether husbands or friends, seek to win the favor of the beloved object. As far as can be gathered from the words he occasionally let drop, the crossing of his first love might have been the innocent cause of this; and as the object of this passion, by the directions of her mother and grandmother, treated him with harshness, where, then, could he learn to make love?"

The birth of her firstborn son, Frederick Louis, in 1707 was celebrated greatly in Prussia, and Sophia Dorothea successfully asked the king to liberate the imprisoned minister Eberhard von Danckelmann. In 1708, after the death of her firstborn son, the physicians declared that Sophia Dorothea was not likely to conceive again, which prompted the remarriage of her father-in-law. However, she gave birth to several children in the following years, and finally to a son who survived in 1712.

=== Queen in Prussia ===
In 1713, her father-in-law Frederick I died and was succeeded by her spouse Frederick William I, making her queen in Prussia.

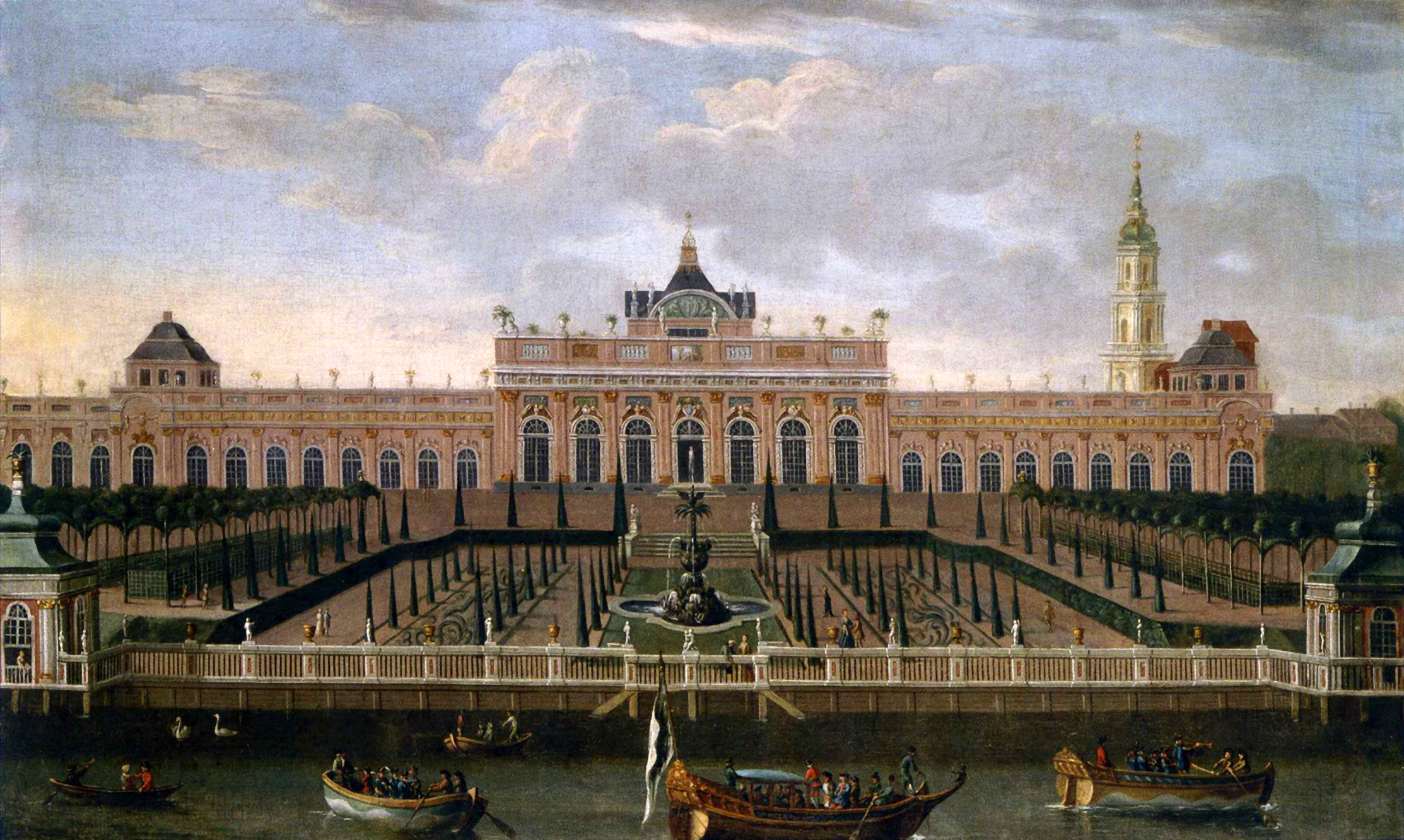
Monbijou Palace in Berlin (around 1739/40)

She lived with her husband and family in the Berlin Palace and also had to take part in the summer stays at the City Palace, Potsdam, and the frequent hunting stays in her husband's hunting lodge in Königs Wusterhausen, but she took refuge as often as she could in the Monbijou Palace, a small pleasure palace on the banks of the Spree in Berlin, which her father-in-law gave her in 1712. Gradually she moved her court entirely there and lived there until the end of her life.

At the time of the accession, Prussia was at war with Sweden, and Sophia Dorothea accompanied Frederick William during the campaign of 1715, though she soon returned to Berlin to give birth to her daughter. During the war, the king left directions to his ministers to consult her and take no action without her approval in the case of emergency. In 1717, she hosted Peter the Great on his visit to Berlin at her own palace Monbijou, as per the king's request, which was vandalized as a result. Sophia Dorothea's first favorite was her maid of honor, von Wagnitz, who was dismissed after an intrigue in which Kreutz and her mother tried to make her the king's mistress, as well as being a spy of the French ambassador Rothenburg.

Queen Sophia Dorothea was admired for her gracious manners and nicknamed "Olympia" for her regal bearing, but scarred by smallpox and overweight with time, she was not called a beauty. She was known as extremely haughty, proud, and ambitious, but Frederick William greatly disliked her interference in politics, as it was his belief that women should be kept only for breeding, and kept submissive as they would otherwise dominate their husbands. The king was known for his parsimony and dislike of idleness to such a degree that he would beat people in the street as well as in the palace if he viewed them as lazy. The queen complained about the "horrible avarice" he pressed upon the household and as a result, according to Pollnitz, the queen's table was often so sparingly supplied that he had often given her money so that she could be able to have an omelette for supper.

Frederick William viewed her interests in theater, dancing, jewelry and music as frivolous and resented any sign of her living a life independently from his authority: he particularly disliked her interest in gambling, and it is reported that she and her partners would have coffee beans ready on the table during gambling, so that if the king appeared, they could pretend to be playing with them rather than money. On one occasion, the queen took the opportunity of the king being ill to host a ball at Monbijou with dancing and music, and where she herself gambled while wearing her diamond set. When the king suddenly arrived, the dancing and music stopped immediately, and the queen unclasped her jewels and hid them in her pocket. His manner toward her was described as rough and so noted that when he displayed the opposite, it was seen as a surprise. Upon the death of her mother in 1726, Sophia Dorothea inherited a sum of three million, whereupon it attracted attention that Frederick William suddenly treated her very well: the Imperial ambassador reported that this was merely because he wanted her money, and when she never received it (as her brother refused to release the sum), Frederick William resumed his usual manner toward her. For her part, Sophia Dorothea did not have a high opinion of the king's military interest or skill, and at one occasion, when he spoke disparagingly of the English commanders retorted: "No doubt they must wish to give you the command of their army."

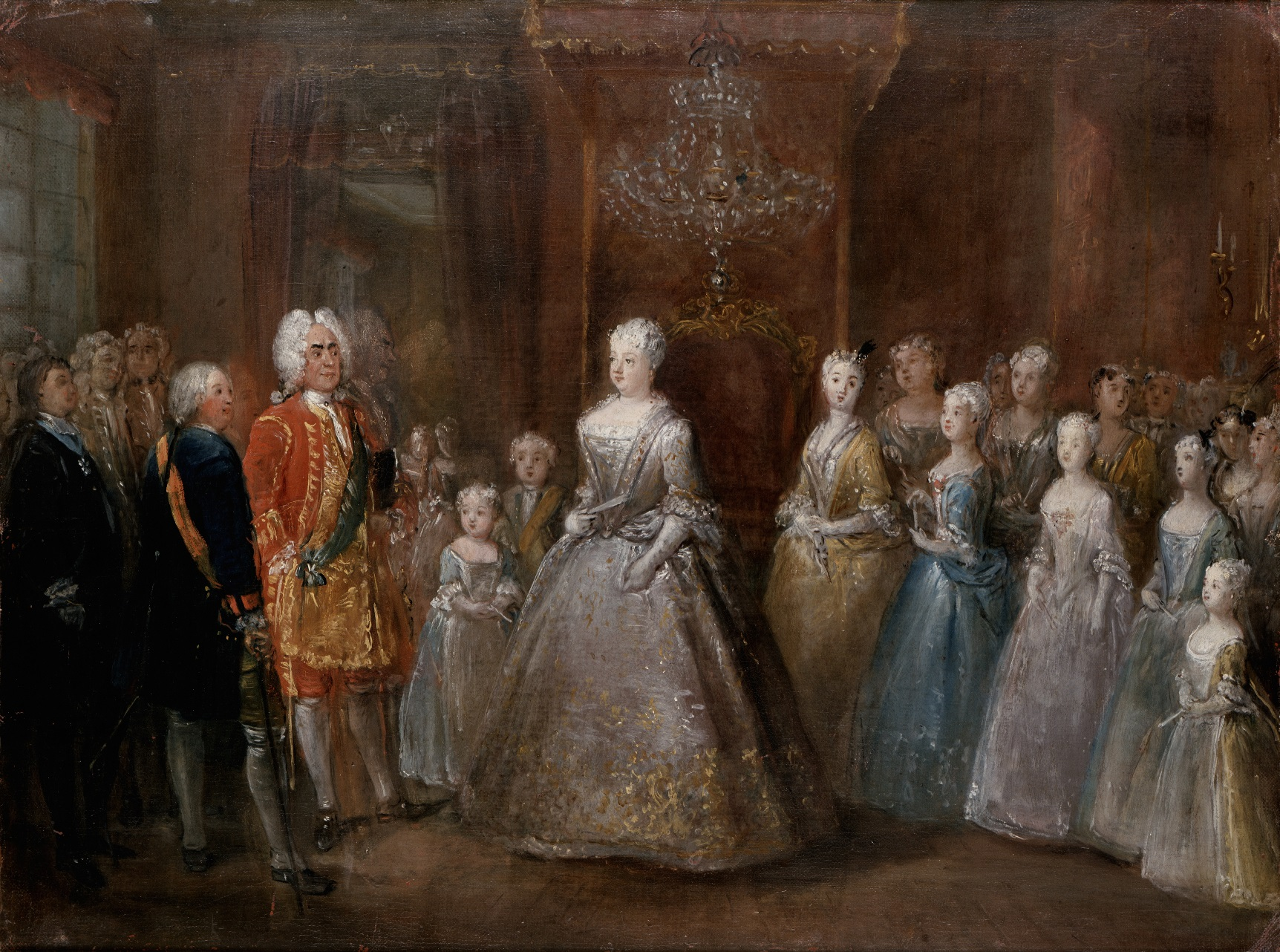
Sophia Dorothea of Hanover in center during the visit of King Augustus II of Poland to Berlin.

Upon the illness of the king in Brandenburg during the campaign of 1719, he sent for Sophia Dorothea and entrusted her with his will, cautioning secrecy. Within the document, she was named regent during the minority of their son, with Charles VI, Holy Roman Emperor, and King George I of Great Britain as guardians to the crown prince. The king's favorites, military general Friedrich von Grumbkow and Leopold I of Anhalt-Dessau, offered the queen's favorite Madame de Blaspiel a bribe if she procured information for them and influenced the queen in their favor; she in turn informed the queen, who informed the king, who summoned von Grumbkow and the prince and told them to return to Berlin. They then tasked Madame de Blaspiel's lover, Count de Manteufel, the Saxon ambassador, to acquire the document or at least find out its meaning: the queen did give de Blaspiel the document, and its contents were revealed to Grumbkow and Anhalt. Grumbkow and Anhalt, now wishing to lessen the queen's influence after learning of the will appointing her regent, unsuccessfully tried to accuse her before the king of having borrowed money and pawning a pair of earrings given to her by the king to pay her gambling debts. The queen countered by accusing Grumbkow of plotting against her.

Concurrently, the Clement Affair took place, in which the alleged Hungarian nobleman Clement gained access to the king by use of false letters and convinced him that the courts of Vienna and Dresden were orchestrating a plot to depose him in favor of the crown prince who, under the guardianship of the emperor, the queen, Grumbkow, and Arnhalt, was to then be raised a Catholic. All were accused of having been implicated in the plot before Clement was exposed as a con artist and summarily executed; another implicated was M. de Troschke, a gentleman of the chamber in service to the king, in whose possession was found a letter from Madame de Blaspiel expressing anger at the king's imprisonment of a suspected accomplice, Monsieur de Kamecke. Grumbkow, suspecting the queen's favorite to have exposed his plot against the queen, delivered the letter to the king, who had de Blaspiel arrested, imprisoned for a year at Spandau, and then banished. Her arrest forced the queen to remove the will of 1719 from the possession of Blaspiel before it was discovered there, to which end her chaplain procured it from the officer commissioned to seal up de Blaspiel's room. After this the queen replaced her as confidant with her daughter, Princess Wilhelmine.

Sophia Dorothea had a very close relationship to her eldest son, Crown Prince Frederick, who was harshly treated by his father, who perceived him as effeminate. According to her daughter Wilhelmine, the queen widened the rift between the king and the crown prince by demonstrating that she viewed the king's demands as unfair:

"Whatever my father ordered my brother to do, my mother commanded him to do the very reverse."

Frederick William accused her of having damaged his relationship with his children, and therefore banned them from seeing her without his presence. When the king banned the queen from communicating with her son, she corresponded with him through her daughter Wilhelmine. When he refused to let her see her eldest children, she invited them to her rooms in secrecy; on at least one occasion, Frederick and Wilhelmine were forced to hide in the furniture in her rooms when Frederick William came to her room unexpectedly while they were there. At the same time, the queen's favorite, Madame de Ramen, acted as a spy for the king, causing their relationship to deteriorate sharply. Her children were terrorized and frequently beaten by Frederick William, who may have suffered from porphyria. During the latter years of the king's life, he was often seized by fits of violence during which he hit people with his cane and threw things at his children. This was a difficult situation for his family, as he often forced them to attend him, refusing to let them leave from 9 AM until bedtime.

==== Anglo-Prussian marriage alliance ====
Sophia Dorothea held a longtime ambition to arrange a double marriage of her eldest son, Crown Prince Frederick, to Princess Amelia of Great Britain, and her eldest daughter Wilhelmine to Frederick, future Prince of Wales. This was a project that had first been raised during the children's infancy and would result in a strong alliance between Prussia and Great Britain. Her plan was opposed by the king's favorites Grumbkow and Anhalt, who wished to arrange a marriage between Wilhelmine and Anhalt's nephew, Frederick William, Margrave of Brandenburg-Schwedt (the king's first cousin). He was next in line to inherit the throne after the crown prince, whose health was delicate. If he succeeded, Anhalt and Grumbkow hoped to come into a position of power.

In 1723, the queen convinced the king to give his consent to the Prussian-British marriage alliance. In October of that year, they hosted a visit by George I in Berlin, who inspected Wilhelmine and agreed to the double marriage alliance if it was approved by Parliament. One day, Frederick William went to visit George I in Goehr. Sophia Dorothea did not accompany him, because she gave birth unexpectedly just before they were to leave. Sophia had been unaware of her pregnancy, leading to a rumor that she had tried to hide it. This caused Frederick William to suspect her of adultery. Upon his return, he had to be prevented from beating her by her chief lady-in-waiting, Sophie von Kameke, who held his arm and told him "if he had only come there to kill his wife, he had better have kept away." The king questioned the physician Stahl, his regimental surgeon Holzendorf, and von Kameke about the queen's suspected adultery, upon which von Kameke told him that "if he were not her king she would strangle him on the spot" for his accusation, which resulted in him making an apology to the queen and dismissing the affair.

George I promised that the double marriage alliance would be formally agreed upon in connection with the Treaty of Hanover (1725). Sophia Dorothea accompanied Frederick William to meet George in Hanover to discuss the matter, and was left there to handle the negotiations when he returned to Berlin. However, she failed to accomplish anything, as the matter was avoided by both George I and his ministers. When she returned to Berlin, Frederick William was so discontent with her failure that he had the passage between their apartments walled up (it remained so for six weeks). Frederick, Prince of Wales, sent his agent Lamotte to ask whether she would permit a secret visit by him to see his intended bride, Wilhelmine. The queen agreed, but made the mistake of saying so to the British ambassador Dubourguai, which obliged him to inform George I. George recalled Frederick to England, and had Lamotte arrested and imprisoned. All this damaged the queen and the prospect of the marriage alliance in the eyes of the king, causing a great row between them.

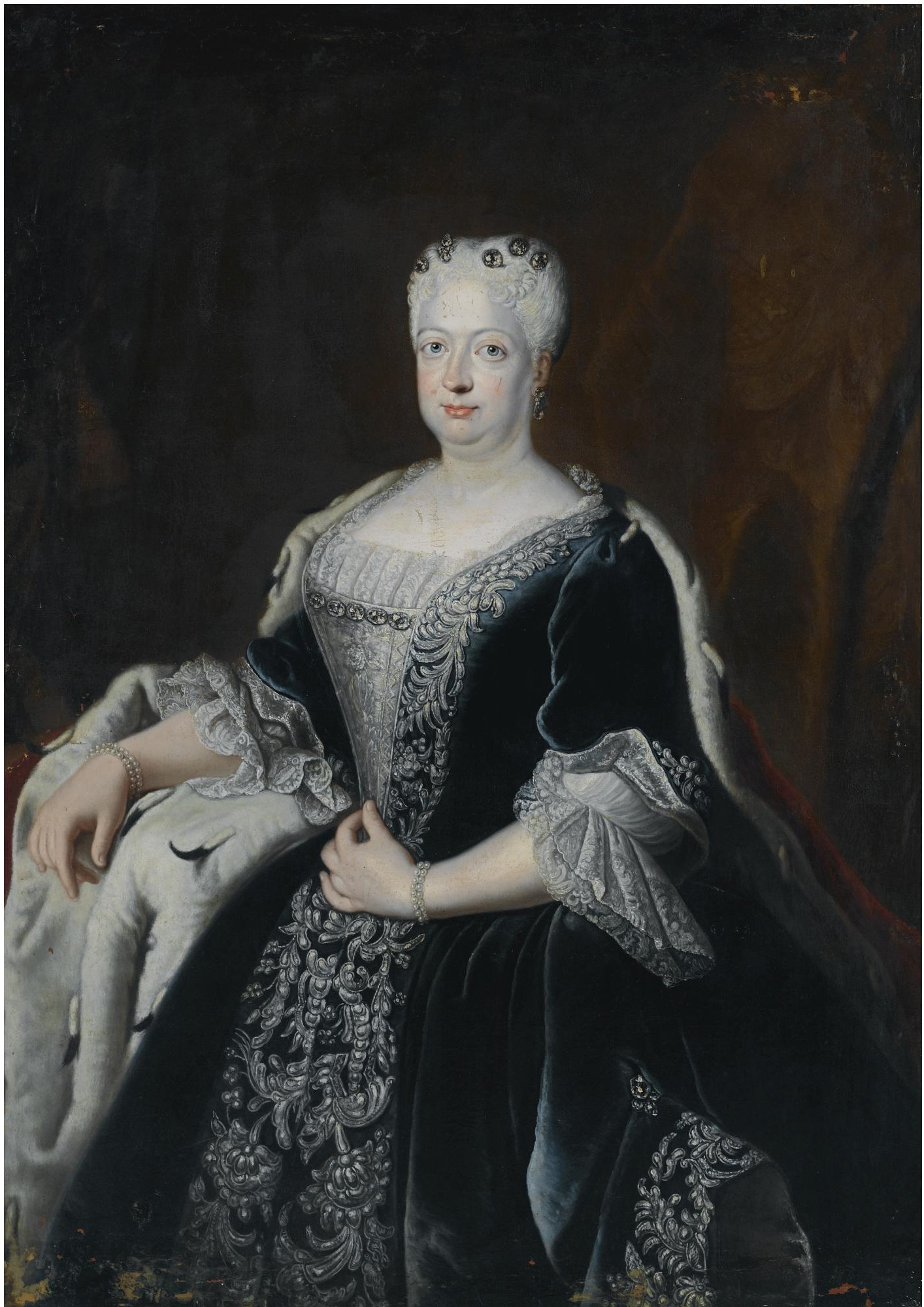
Sophia Dorothea of Hanover

From 1726 until 1735, Friedrich Heinrich von Seckendorff was the Austrian ambassador in Berlin and the king's favorite. He came to be the main opponent of the queen, due to his opposition to the British-Prussian marriage alliance. The animosity between the queen and Seckendorff was well known and commented on by the king:

"My wife and the whole world are against him; the Prince of Anhalt and my Fritz hate him like the pest, but he is a brave fellow, and loves me."

In 1729, negotiations for the British marriage alliance were disrupted by the activities of Frederick William's army recruiters. Frederick William wanted tall soldiers for his army; his agents went all over Germany paying or even kidnapping such men. They snatched men from Hanover, whose ruler was also the king of Great Britain. This caused diplomatic incidents, and Frederick William stopped all negotiations. But the queen renewed them. When Grumbkow revealed her independent negotiations to the king, the king stated that he would marry Wilhelmine to either a prince of Schwedt or Weissenfels, and that Sophia could consent or be imprisoned for life.

She was advised by Borck to suggest Prince Frederick of Bayreuth as an alternative, which she did. Then she wrote to the queen of Great Britain, claiming illness. The reply was unsatisfactory, and the king learned of her pretense. Frederick William beat Wilhelmine in Sophia's presence, and Sophia agreed to drop the British marriage, provided that Wilhelmine was married to Frederick of Bayreuth, not the Duke of Saxe-Weissenfels. She fell genuinely ill shortly afterward, and successfully asked him to reconcile with their eldest son and daughter, and afterwards beat them only in private.

Matters changed when the British ambassador Hotham arrived and officially suggested marriage between Wilhelmine and the Prince of Wales, providing the king agreed to marriage between Crown Prince Frederick and Princess Amelia of Great Britain, and the dismissal of his favorite, the anti-British Grumbkow, whom they accused of treason against him. The king agreed to the terms, if proof of Grumbkow's guilt was shown, and if his son was appointed governor of Hanover. Grumbkow allied with Seckendorff to prevent the marriage alliance and thus his own fall, while the latter informed the king that the British suggestion was a result of the queen's intrigues to depose him in favor of his son and make Prussia a de facto British province through "the vain and haughty English daughter-in-law", whose extravagance would ruin the state. When ambassador Hotham returned with the proof of Grumbkow's guilt, the king reportedly flew into a rage and beat the ambassador. The queen had the crown prince write to Hotham and unsuccessfully ask him to reconcile with the king; before departing Prussia, however, he left the evidence against Grumbkow with the queen.

==== Escape attempt of the Crown Prince ====
Sophia Dorothea spent many days talking to her eldest son in the library, and was informed of his plans to escape from his father's custody. In August 1730, during a tour he made with his father through the provinces, Frederick tried to escape from Prussia, and was brought back a prisoner. The king informed the queen of the event through Sophie von Kamecke before their arrival. There were compromising letters by the queen and Princess Wilhelmine in Frederick's portefeuille, which was forwarded to them by a friend after the arrest of Frederick's accomplice Hans Hermann von Katte. They burned the letters and replaced them with fabricated and uncompromising ones. However, "as there were near fifteen hundred of the originals, although we worked very hard, not more than six hundred or seven hundred could be completed in the time". The portefeuille was also filled with ornamental articles. When the portefeuille was later opened, Frederick did not recognize its content. Grumbkow immediately suspected what had transpired and stated: "These cursed women have outwitted us!"

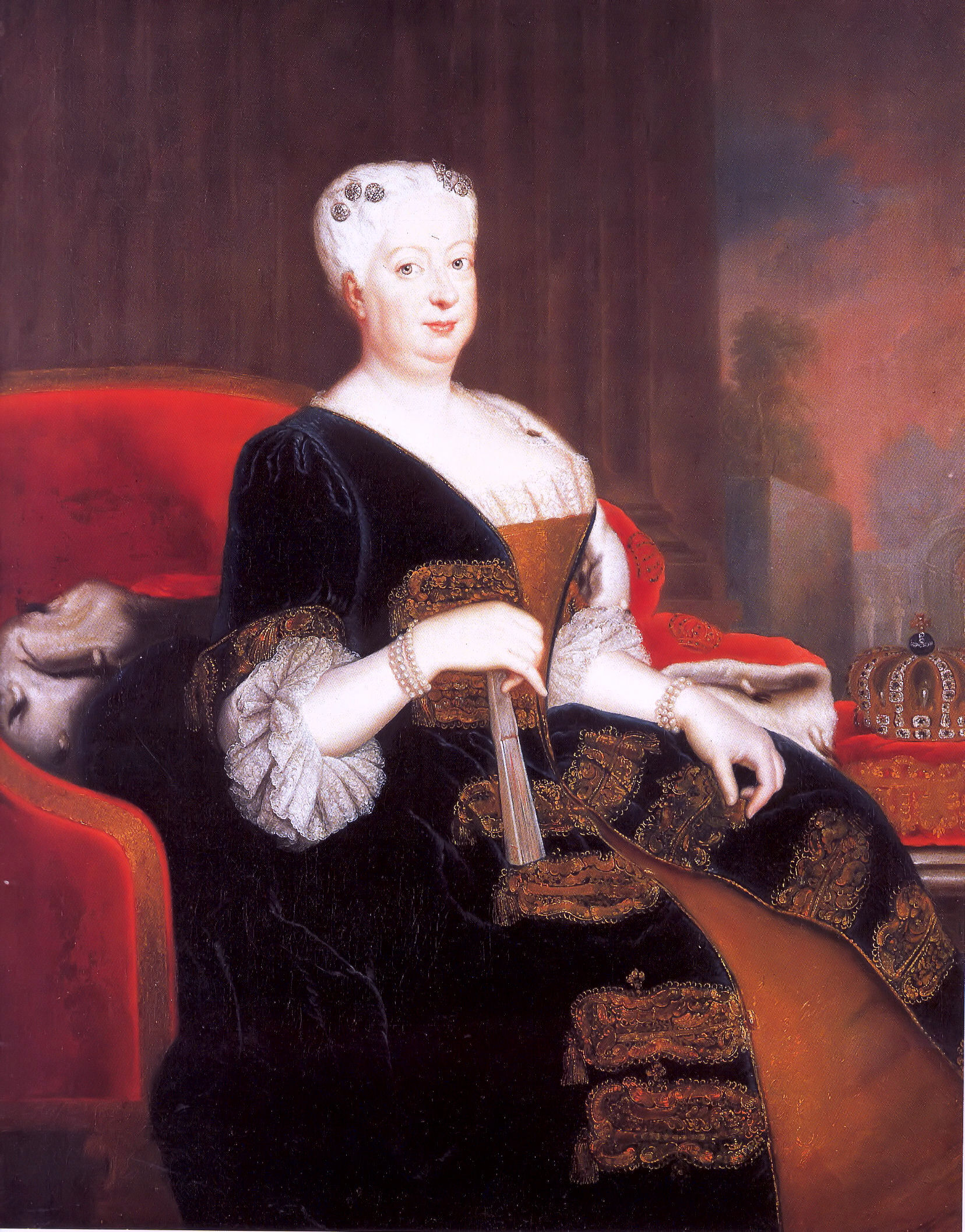
Georg Wenzelaus von Knobelsdorff, Queen Sophia Dorothea von Preussen

When the king returned, he told the queen that her son was dead. She replied: "What! Have you murdered your son?" When given the reply: "He was not my son, he was only a miserable deserter," she became hysterical and screamed repeatedly: "Mon Dieu, mon fils! mon Dieu, mon fils!" The king then started to beat Wilhelmine and would possibly have killed her. Her siblings and ladies-in-waiting intervened. Frederick's accomplice Katte arrived as a prisoner, so the king beat him instead. When Frederick was imprisoned at the fortress in Küstrin, Grumbkow acted as mediator between Frederick and his parents, managing to reconcile them.

The imprisonment was followed by continuous conflict between the king and the queen about the marriage of Princess Wilhelmine. While the king pressed for a marriage to the Margrave of Schwedt or the Prince of Weissenfels, the queen exchanged secret messages with her daughter and urged her not to accept any other groom than the Prince of Wales. This conflict caused the king to threaten to beat the queen and have Mademoiselle Sonsfeld publicly whipped. Finally, Wilhelmine was formally offered the choice between the Margrave of Schwedt, the Duke of Weissenfels, or the Prince of Bayreuth. She chose to marry the latter (as she had not seen him but had seen and disliked the other two), on condition that her father free her brother. Her decision was made against the will of her mother, who threatened to disown her for what she considered to be her daughter's lack of courage, and ordered her not to speak to her future groom when he arrived. The king was furious at the cold demeanor of the queen during the following visit of the Prince of Bayreuth.

After the betrothal of Wilhelmine and the Prince of Bayreuth, a message arrived in which George II consented to Wilhelmine marrying the Prince of Wales without her brother marrying his daughter Amelia. This message convinced the queen that a Prussian-British marriage alliance was possible. She therefore made a point of harassing the Prince of Bayreuth to stop the wedding. On the day of the wedding (20 November 1731), Sophia Dorothea tried to delay the ceremony by disarranging her daughter's hair every time it had been dressed, saying she was not satisfied with the effect, in the hope that a British courier might arrive in time to stop the ceremony.

When Frederick was liberated after his sister's wedding, Sophia Dorothea resumed negotiations with Great Britain to marry him to Princess Amelia, and her next daughter, Philippine Charlotte, to the Prince of Wales, which would complete her life project of a Prussian-British marriage alliance. These plans was crushed in 1733, when Frederick William instead announced a marriage alliance with Brunswick by marrying Frederick to Elisabeth Christine of Brunswick-Wolfenbüttel-Bevern and Philippine Charlotte to Charles I, Duke of Brunswick-Wolfenbüttel.

But Sophia continued to pursue a Prussian-British marriage alliance, accomplishing a "reconciliation between the houses of England and Prussia negotiated by the Queen", this time by the marriage of the Prince of Wales to her third daughter Louisa Ulrika:

"La Herwein has conveyed the portrait of Ulrica to the Prince of Wales, and entertained Olympia (the Queen) with false hopes."

This was crushed upon the marriage of the Prince of Wales in 1736 to Princess Augusta of Saxe-Gotha. Louisa Ulrika went on to become the Queen of Sweden.

Sophia Dorothea favored the French side in the War of the Polish Succession of 1733–36, and disliked the king's participation in the war on the Austrian side. She openly declared her view when the king swore loyalty to Austria: "I shall live to make you, who are so incredulous, believe, and prove to you how you are deceived."

During the last years of the king's life, he was afflicted with fits of illness which often forced him to use a wheelchair, and Sophia Dorothea was ordered to attend to him continuously. She seldom left his room for months before his death, save to follow him in his wheelchair; she bore with his impatience, soothed his suffering, and hers was the hand which, to the last, best smoothed the pillow, and administered the potion.

In the beginning of November 1739, the king was attacked by his last illness. The queen sent for the crown prince on the night of the 26 May 1740, in consequence of a change which had taken place in the king. However, when Frederick arrived from Rheinsberg, whence he had travelled with all speed, he was astonished to find the king in his chair, in the garden; it was, however, but a momentary rally. He had a long final conversation with the Prince Royal, and took a solemn and tender leave of the queen, his sons and daughters, and other relatives.

On the day of his death, Frederick William ordered himself to be taken to the queen's apartment and told her: "Rise, I have but a few hours to live, and I would at least have the satisfaction of dying in your arms."

However, the queen was led out of the room as Frederick William died in the arms of his son and successor.

=== Queen dowager ===
On 31 May 1740, Frederick William died and was succeeded by her son, Frederick II (the Great).

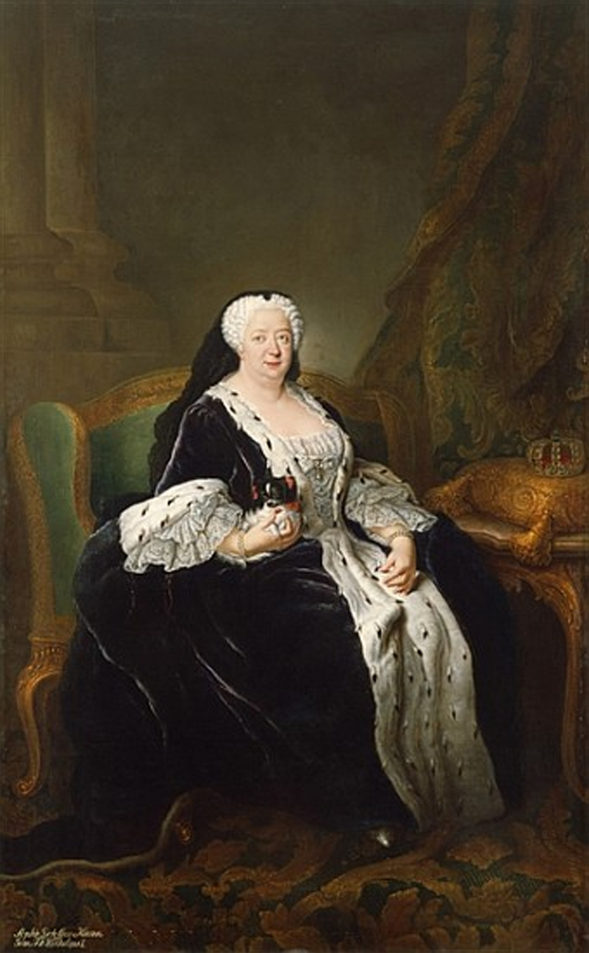
Portrait of Queen Dowager Sophia Dorothea in mourning, 1748

The loss of a husband, who, despite his frequent harsh treatment, had been sincerely attached to her, and who was endeared by the habitual intercourse of many years, deeply affected Sophia Dorothea. When the Marchioness of Bayreuth revisited Berlin, she found her mother clad in deep mourning, and with an air of profound dejection impressed upon her features.

Sophia Dorothea had a very good relationship with her son, the new king. When she addressed him as "Your Majesty" after the funeral of his father, he interrupted her and told her: "Always call me your son, that title is dearer to me than the royal dignity." Frederick was known for his devotion to her, expressed his gratitude for her having raised him and never blamed her for his traumatic childhood, which he instead blamed on his father, and never allowed anyone to criticize her.

Sophia Dorothea lost no importance as a queen dowager: wary of the great respect the king afforded his mother and his neglect of his wife, the foreign envoys and other supplicants considered attending the audience chamber and receptions as of the queen dowager as even more important than that of the queen. Until her death, he honored her as the first lady of his court and placed her before that of his wife, the queen. It was to his mother's chamber the king paid the first visit on his return from campaigns, summoning the queen to meet him there; he regularly invited his mother to his personal residence at Potsdam, where his wife was never invited, and while he seldom visited his wife, he regularly attended his mother at Monbijou, where he took off his hat and remained standing until she gave him permission to sit. Sophia Dorothea presided at the wedding of her son Prince William in 1742, and her daughter Louisa Ulrika in 1744.

The relationship between Sophia Dorothea and her daughter-in-law queen Elisabeth Christine was not good during the first years of her son's reign, as she resented her daughter-in-law's precedence in rank, though her son assured it to be merely formal, but their relationship improved during the last years of her life. Sophia Dorothea saw her son for the last time after his first campaign in January 1757 during the Seven Years' War. At that point she was well, but soon after his departure, her health rapidly declined, and she died on 28 June 1757.

== Issue ==
Issue

Name	Portrait	Lifespan	Notes
Frederick Louis; Prince of Prussia		23 November 1707- 13 May 1708	Died in infancy
Friedrike Wilhelmine; Margravine of Brandenburg-Bayreuth		3 July 1709- 14 October 1758	Married Frederick, Margrave of Brandenburg-Bayreuth and had issue
Frederick William; Prince of Prussia		16 August 1710- 21 July 1711	Died in infancy
Frederick II the Great; King of Prussia		24 January 1712- 17 August 1786	King of Prussia (1740–1786); married Elisabeth Christine of Brunswick-Wolfenbüttel-Bevern but had no issue
Charlotte Albertine; Princess of Prussia		5 May 1713- 10 June 1714	Died in infancy
Frederica Louise; Margravine of Brandenburg-Ansbach		28 September 1714- 4 February 1784	Married Charles William Frederick, Margrave of Brandenburg-Ansbach and had issue
Philippine Charlotte; Duchess of Brunswick-Wolfenbüttel		13 March 1716- 17 February 1801	Married Charles I, Duke of Brunswick-Wolfenbüttel and had issue
Louis Charles William; Prince of Prussia		2 May 1717- 31 August 1719	Died in early childhood
Sophia Dorothea; Margravine of Brandenburg-Schwedt; Princess in Prussia		25 January 1719- 13 November 1765	Married Frederick William, Margrave of Brandenburg-Schwedt, Prince in Prussia and had issue
Louisa Ulrika; Queen of Sweden		24 July 1720- 2 July 1782	Married Adolf Frederick, King of Sweden and had issue
Augustus William; Prince of Prussia		9 August 1722- 12 June 1758	Married Duchess Luise of Brunswick-Wolfenbüttel and had issue (including Frederick William II)
Anna Amalia; Abbess of Quedlinburg		9 November 1723- 30 March 1787	Became Abbess of Quedlinburg 16 July 1755
Frederick Henry Louis; Prince of Prussia		18 January 1726- 3 August 1802	Married Princess Wilhelmina of Hesse-Kassel but had no issue
Augustus Ferdinand; Prince of Prussia		23 May 1730- 2 May 1813	Married Margravine Elisabeth Louise of Brandenburg-Schwedt and had issue

== Ancestors ==
Ancestors of Sophia Dorothea of Hanover

8. George, Duke of Brunswick-Lüneburg
4. Ernest Augustus, Elector of Hanover
9. Anne Eleonore of Hesse-Darmstadt
2. George I of Great Britain
10. Frederick V, Elector Palatine
5. Sophia, Princess Palatine of the Rhine
11. Elizabeth of England
1. Sophia Dorothea of Hanover
12. George, Duke of Brunswick-Lüneburg (= 8)
6. George William, Duke of Brunswick-Lüneburg
13. Anne Eleonore of Hesse-Darmstadt (= 9)
3. Duchess Sophia Dorothea of Celle
14. Alexandre II Desmier, Seigneur d'Olbreuse
7. Éléonore Desmier d'Olbreuse
15. Jacquette Poussard de Vendré

== Notes and sources ==
- Thea Leitner: Skandal bei Hof, Ueberreuter, 1993, ISBN 3-8000-3492-1

Sophia Dorothea of Hanover House of Hanover Cadet branch of the House of Welf Born: 26 March 1687 Died: 28 June 1757
German royalty
Preceded by Sophia Louise of Mecklenburg-Schwerin	Queen consort in Prussia; Electress consort of Brandenburg; 1713-1740	Succeeded by Elisabeth Christine of Brunswick-Bevern
