= Marie Karoline von Fuchs-Mollard =

Governess of Maria Theresa

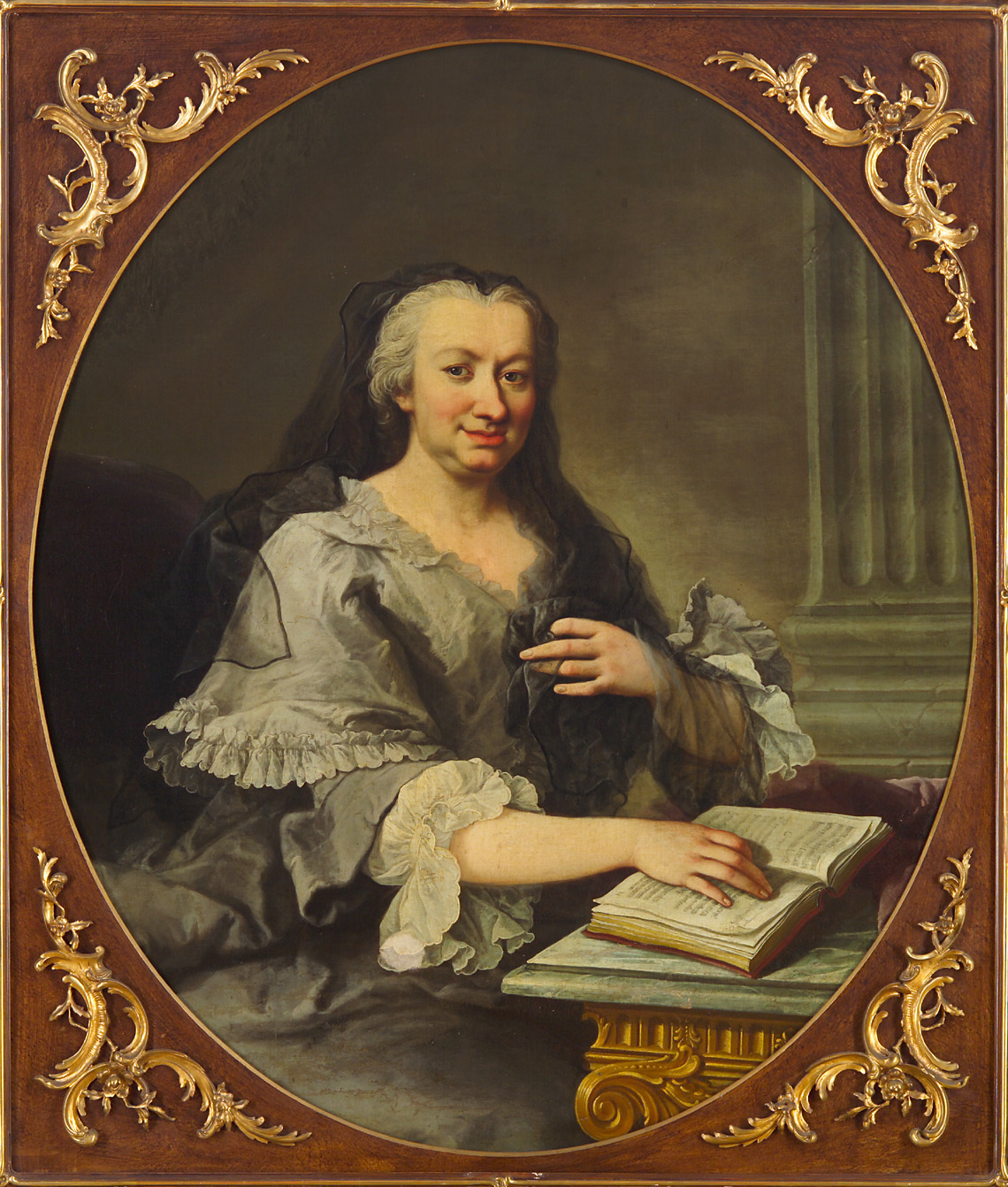
- Born: 14 January 1675
- Died: 27 April 1754 (aged 73)
- Spouse: Count Christoph Ernst von Fuchs
- Parent(s): Franz Maximilian Graf Mollard and Katharina von Seeau

Countess Marie Karoline von Fuchs-Mollard (14 January 1675 – 27 April 1754), known as Charlotte, was the governess of Maria Theresa of Austria.

== Early life ==
Born in Palais Mollard, Vienna to Count Franz Maximilian von Mollard (1621-1690), vice-president of the Imperial Court Chamber by his second wife, Katharina von Seeau. She had one half-brother from her father's previous marriage to Maria Katharina Thoman von Frankenberg (1630-1694), Count Ferdinand Ernst von Mollard (1648-1716), who served as President of the Imperial Court Chamber.

== Imperial court ==
Marie Karoline came to the imperial court as a lady-in-waiting of the future queen consort of Portugal, Maria Anna of Austria, the daughter of Leopold I, Holy Roman Emperor.

Empress Elisabeth Christine entrusted the Countess with the education and upbringing of her daughter Maria Theresa, the heiress presumptive of the Habsburg dominions, when the girl was born in 1717. Countess Fuchs taught her etiquette and practically raised her. Maria Theresa developed a notably close relationship with Countess Fuchs.

When Maria Theresa succeeded her father as the ruler of Hungary, Bohemia and Austria, she gave Countess Fuchs a castle called Fuchsschlössl and made her a chatelaine.

== Personal life ==
She married Count Christoph Ernst Fuchs von Bimbach und Dornheim (1664-1719) in 1710 and had issue:

- Countess Maria Josepha Fuchs von Bimbach und Dornheim (1711-1764) ⚭ Count Anton Christoph Karl Nostitz-Rieneck, who was her half-sister's son in law; no issue ⚭ Count Leopold Joseph von Daun, Prince of Teano; had issue
- Countess Maria Ernestina Rosalia Fuchs von Bimbach und Dornheim (b. 1712)
- Maria Elisabeth Carolina Fuchs von Bimbach und Dornheim (1715-1716)

== Death ==
When Countess Fuchs died in Vienna in 1754, Maria Theresa ordered that she be buried in the Imperial Crypt. Thus, the Countess has the honor of being the only non-Habsburg buried in the Imperial Crypt. The 150th anniversary of her death was celebrated by a special Mass in the Capucin Crypt.
