= Ingeborg Christiane Rosenørn =

Danish courtier and philanthropist

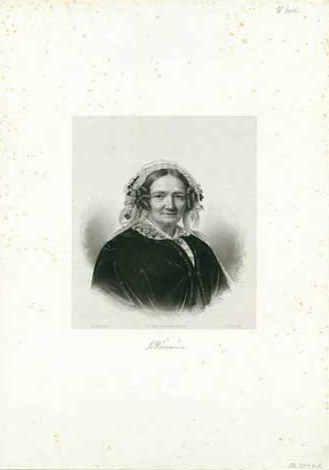
Ingeborg Christiane Rosenørn, née Wormskiold (1784–1859), Danish noblewoman and philanthropist

Ingeborg Christiane Rosenörn (1784–1859) was a Danish courtier and philanthropist; Overhofmesterinde to the Danish queen, Caroline Amalie of Augustenburg from 1845 to 1859.

She was the cousin of Peder Wormskjold and Margrethe Mette Teilmann and married in 1807 to her cousin Peder Otto Rosenörna (d. 1828). She became a leading member of the Danish philanthropists after her marriage and a muse for the poet Ingemanns: their correspondence was published in 1881. Through her charity work – she was the chairperson of a number of charitable societies – she became acquainted with the queen. In 1843, she was appointed to the representative of the queen and chairperson of the charitable society Plejeforening, and two years later, she was appointed mistress of the robes.
