= Dyveke Sigbritsdatter =

Mistress of Christian II of Denmark

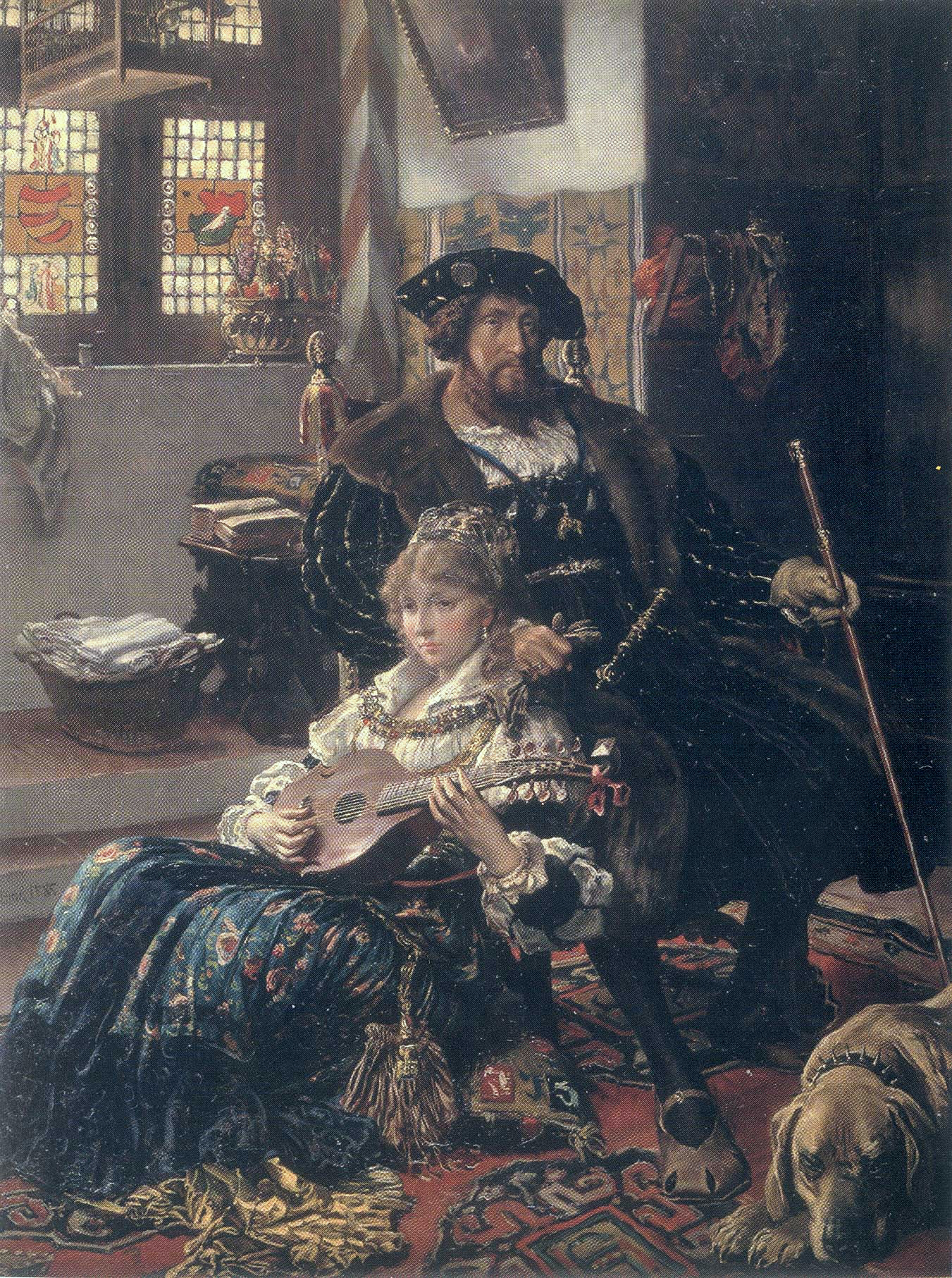
Artistic rendition of Dyveke Sigbritsdatter and Christian II

Dyveke Sigbritsdatter or Dyveke Willomsdatter, (1490 – 21 September 1517), in Denmark normally known as "Dyveke" (in modern Dutch "duifje" means "little dove"), was the mistress to Christian II of Denmark.

Dyveke was a commoner, the daughter of the Dutch merchant Sigbrit Willoms, who lived in Bergen in Norway. Dyveke became the mistress to Christian II in 1507 or 1509. They met in Bergen, and Christian took Dyveke with him to Oslo, where he was regent, and to Copenhagen, when he became king in 1513. Their relationship has been the inspiration of many poets, but in fact little is known about it. The mother of Dyveke, Sigbrit, acted as an advisor to the king, which was much disliked, especially by the nobility, and every effort was therefore made to separate Dyveke and Christian, which would ensure the departure also of Sigbrit from the court. Whether Dyveke herself had any political influence is unknown. Though Christian married Isabella of Austria and had her crowned in 1515, he refused to end his relationship with Dyveke. This created tension between him and his brother-in-law, the future Emperor Charles V. In 1516, the Emperor demanded that Dyveke and her mother be sent away, but Christian refused.

Dyveke died in the summer of 1517, possibly by eating poisoned cherries. Her death led to the execution of nobleman Torben Oxe but his guilt has never been proved, and both an initiative by the court of the Emperor Maximilian I or even an accidental poisoning have been suggested as an explanation. Her mother Sigbrit went on to become Christian II's financial advisor. Nothing is recorded for Sigbrit after 1523 although one assumption has her imprisoned for witchcraft, dying in 1532.
