= Juliane Wedel Jarlsberg =

Norwegian court official (1818–1872)

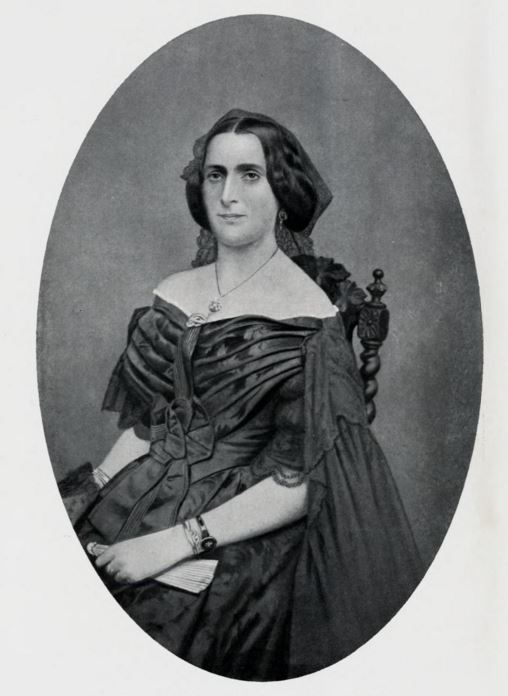
- Jalsberg c. 1932
- Born: Juliane Cathrine Wilhelmine Wedel Jarlsberg; 1818
- Died: 1872 (aged 53–54)

Juliane Cathrine Wilhelmine Wedel Jarlsberg (1818–1872) was a Norwegian court official. She served as the overhoffmesterinne for Queen Louise of Norway.

== Life ==
She was the daughter of Norwegian baron Ferdinand Carl Maria Wedel-Jarlsberg (1781–1857) and Juliane Wilhelmine von Benzon (1783–1853). In 1851, she married the Norwegian nobleman Frederik (Fritz) Joachim Wedel Jarlsberg (1819–1880). She was the mother of Fritz Wedel Jarlsberg.

Her parents served at the Norwegian court, where her father was head of the court of king Oscar I and her mother as statsfru (lady-in-waiting) to queen mother Désirée Clary.

Prior to her marriage, Juliane Wedel Jarlsberg served as hoffrøken (maid of honour) to queen Josephine of Sweden and Norway under Fanny Løvenskiold. After her marriage, she was appointed overhoffmesterinne or principal lady-in-waiting to Queen Louise of Norway, who became queen in 1859. Her spouse was in parallel appointed be the hoffmarskalk (chamberlain) of the spouse of queen Louise, king Charles IV of Norway.

During the Union of Sweden and Norway, the royal family mainly stayed in Sweden, and the Norwegian court staff served during their visits in Norway: during their visits in Norway, the royal family left their Swedish entourage at the border and was welcomed by their Norwegian court staff, and turned over their duties to their Swedish equivalents, and she thus shared her duties with her Swedish equivalent Wilhelmina Bonde in this fashion.

The queen's Norwegian household was however much smaller than her Swedish household: in 1869, Juliane Wedel Jarlsberg's Swedish equivalent Wilhelmina Bonde had three married ladies-in-waiting (statsfru) and three maids-of-honour (hovfröken) under her, while Juliane Wedel Jarlsberg had only one statsfru (Josephine Sparre) and one maid-of-honour (Alexandra Morgenstierne).

Court offices
Preceded by Fanny Løvenskiold	Overhoffmesterinne to the Queen of Norway; 1859–1871	Succeeded by Alette Due
