= Fanny Løvenskiold =

Norwegian court official

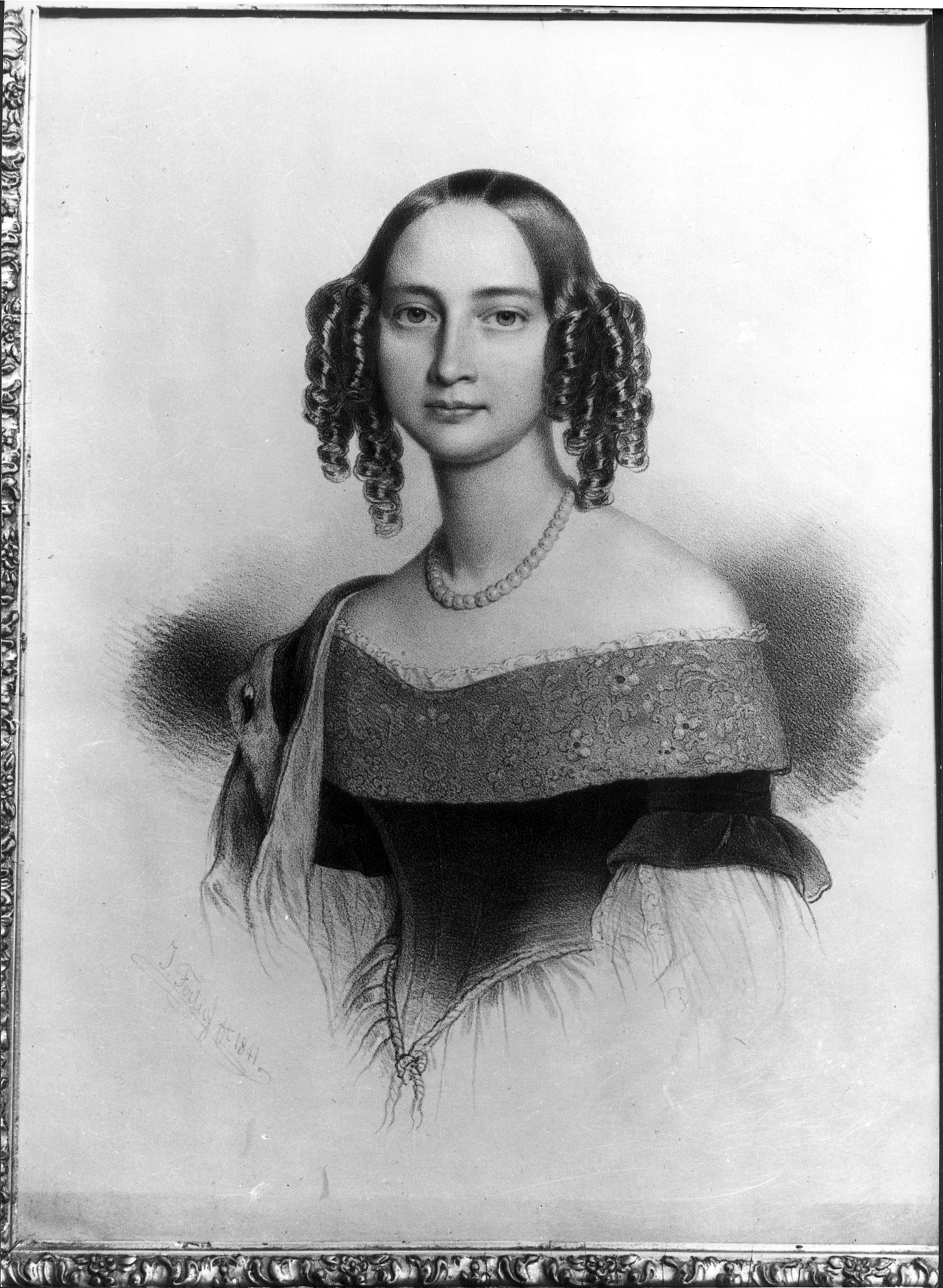
- Fanny Løvenskiold
- Born: 7 February 1807
- Died: 19 March 1873 (aged 66)
- Occupation: Court official

Francisca "Fanny" Veronika Johanne Josephine Løvenskiold (7 February 1807 – 19 March 1873) was a Norwegian court official. She served as the overhoffmesterinne for Queen Josephine of Norway.

== Life ==
She was born Francisca Veronika Johanne Josephine von Seckendorf-Aberdar on 26 February 1827, the daughter of baron Johan Carl August Max von Seckendorf-Aberdar and Magdalene von Hommer. She married Ernst Løvenskiold (1803–1867), son of Severin Løvenskiold and chief of the Norwegian state court under Oscar I.

In 1846, she was appointed principal lady-in-waiting to queen Josephine. During the Union of Sweden and Norway, the royal family had a separate Norwegian court, who met them at the border and served during their visits to Norway.

During the reign of Oscar I, the royal household was reduced in both Sweden and Norway. Many offices were purposely left vacant, and no married ladies-in-waiting (statsfru) were appointed in Sweden or Norway: in 1849 Fanny Løvenskiold's Swedish equivalent Charlotta Skjöldebrand had two maids of honour under her while Fanny Løvenskiold had two, Inga Hedewig Vogt och Juliane Wedel Jarlsberg, the last of whom were to eventually succeed her. Aside from the ladies-in-waiting, however, the queen's Swedish household was much bigger from her Norwegian one.

Fanny Løvenskiold would also have served crown princess Louise, who stayed in Norway for a full year, an uncommonly long period, in 1856–1857.

== See also ==
- Løvenskiold family
- House of Seckendorff

Court offices
Preceded by Karen Wedel-Jarlsberg	Overhoffmesterinne to the Queen of Norway; 1846-1859	Succeeded by Juliane Wedel Jarlsberg
