= Anne-Malène Piper =

Swedish court official

Anna Magdalena Sofia Charlotta "Anne-Malène" Piper (née Wachtmeister; 1819–1875) was a Swedish court official. She served as överhovmästarinna (senior lady-in-waiting) to the queen of Sweden, Louise of the Netherlands, from 1871 to 1872.

She was the daughter of court chamberlain baron Bleckert Wachtmeister and countess Margareta Christina Charlotta Mörner af Morlanda. She married the courtier count Axel Mauritz Piper of Ängsö (d. 1866) in 1841.

She served as statsfru (lady of the Bedchamber) to queen Louise in 1862–1871.

She was chosen to serve the princess of Wales during the visit of the prince and princess of Wales in Sweden in 1864, and accompanied the king and queen on their visit to Copenhagen in November 1870.

While no överhovmästarinna was appointed after the retirement of Wilhelmina Bonde in 1869, it was customary for the ladies-in-waiting with the title statsfru to perform the functions of the senior lady-in-waiting in such cases. In 1871, she was formally appointed to senior lady-in-waiting. Queen Louise died the same year, but Piper was allowed to remain her office by the widowed king.

In April 1871, she was forced to undergo a breast operation, and fell ill with erysipelas, which nearly caused her death, during which Fritz von Dardel described her:

"countess Piper is the only öfverhofmästarinna who has so far succeeded at court. Her good, easy going temper and her youthful mind, so free from all pretentions, has contributed a great deal to the pleasant life at court."

Court offices
| Preceded by Wilhelmina Bonde | Överhovmästarinna to the Queen of Sweden; 1871–1872 | Succeeded by Elisabet Augusta Piper |
