= Louise, Duchess of Scania =

Louise, Duchess of Scania - Swedish Hertiginnan Lovisa (Louise) av Skåne - may refer to:

- Louise of the Netherlands, Queen consort of Sweden 1859
- Louise, née Mountbatten, Queen consort of Sweden 1950
