= Wilhelmina Bonde =

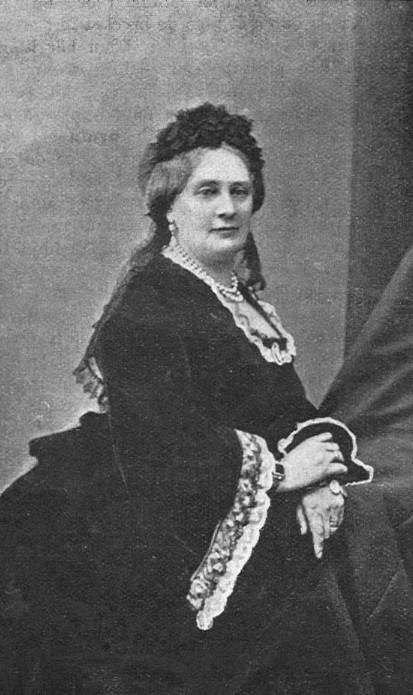
Wilhelmina Bonde

Wilhelmina Sofia Charlotta "Mina" Bonde (née Lewenhaupt; 10 July 1817 – 1899), was a Swedish countess and courtier. She served as överhovmästarinna to the Queen of Sweden, Louise of the Netherlands, from 1860 to 1869. She was also known as countess Minchen.

== Life ==
Wilhelmina Bonde was the daughter of the courtier count Klaes Lewenhaupt and Wilhemina Kristina Beck-Friis. She was introduced to court and served as hovfröken (maid of honor) to Queen Josephine in 1844–1846.

She married the ceremony master of the royal court, baron Carl Jedvard Bonde of the House of Bonde, in 1846, and settled into his residence in the capital during the winters and Ericsberg Castle during the summers. Bonde is described as a loyal royalist with an elegant and imposing manner, and had a leading role within the Swedish high society life. She exerted charity toward the tenants at her spouse's estate.

In 1857, she was appointed to the post of senior lady-in-waiting or hovmästarinna to the new princess Sophia of Nassau upon her arrival in Sweden.

=== Senior lady-in-waiting to the queen ===
In 1860, she was appointed överhovmästarinna (Mistress of the Robes) to Queen Louise in succession to countess Stefanie Hamilton, the highest rank for a female at the royal Swedish court. This position made her the head of all the female courtiers in the court of the queen with the rank of Excellency, outranking also the majority of males and given superior status with responsibility of all the ladies-in-waiting of the queen's court. She accepted the position out of personal friendship with Louise and the condition that she would be allowed to delegate her tasks to one of the ladies-in-waiting when her private life demanded to, and she normally left the daily affairs to others.

She was in service during the Union of Sweden-Norway, but only served in Sweden: during their visits in Norway, the royal family left their Swedish entourage at the border and was welcomed by their Norwegian court staff, and she thus turned over her duties to her Norwegian equivalent Juliane Wedel Jarlsberg at such occasions.

Bonde had a good relationship with queen Louise, who counted upon her to rectify those ladies-in-waiting which aroused the queen's jealousy by attracting attention from the king. On one occasion, the queen wrote to her: "..thank you for reprimanding the ladies, it helped. Some are afraid of you, and that is very fortunate, I hope it will continue like that. I do not have to tell you of whom I am referring to".

Mina Bonde upheld a strict discipline at court, was an expert on etiquette and could reprimand not only courtiers but also members of the royal house in matters of etiquette. Bonde left her position at court on her own request in 1869. When she requested to be relieved of her position, Fritz von Dardel commented in his chronicle: "Their Majesties are not likely to mourn over her departure, as they have never approved of her outdated ideas in everything related to etiquette". Bonde herself remarked that she was not liked by the King, because "...she caught him several times when he was kissing Miss Koskull hiding behind the doors." No successor was appointed for two years after her departure, during which her tasks were performed by the ladies-in-waiting ranked as statsfru, among them being Anne-Malène Wachtmeister and Malvina De la Gardie.

Her departure was regretted by the conservative faction at court and welcomed by the reformist fraction: three years after her departure, in 1872, women who were not members of the nobility (if married to a man with a court office or high military rank) were for the first time allowed to be presented at court, and after the accession of Oscar II to the throne in 1873, the royal court was reduced. During the 1890s, however, "Grefvinnan Bondes anteckningsbok" ('Countess Bonde's Note Book') was still used as an encyclopedia in etiquette matters at the Swedish royal court.

=== Later life ===
She was a friend of princess Lovisa of Sweden, who later often visited her during her visits in Sweden after having moved to Denmark after her marriage. She became a widow in 1895 and retired to Gustavsvik Manor, where she died four years later.

Court offices
Preceded by Stefanie Hamilton	Överhovmästarinna to the Queen of Sweden; 1860–1869	Succeeded by Anne-Malène Wachtmeister
