= Malvina De la Gardie =

19th century Swedish court official

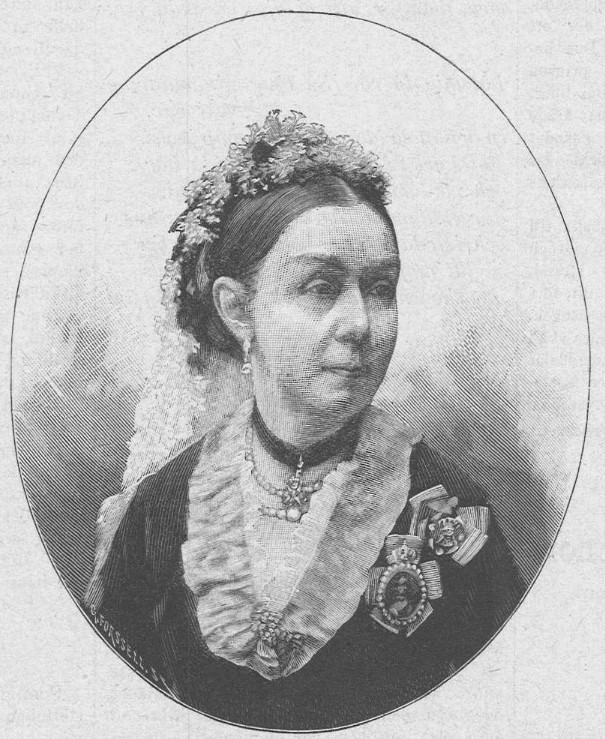
- Born: 1824; Sweden
- Died: 1901 (aged 76–77)
- Occupation: court official
- Known for: served as överhovmästarinna (senior lady-in-waiting) to the queen of Sweden, Sophia of Nassau, from 1880 to 1890
- Spouse: Axel Jakob De la Gardie (m. 1845)
- Parents: Gustaf Reinhold von Platen (father); Christina von Stockenström (mother)

Malvina De la Gardie (1824–1901) was a Swedish court official. She served as överhovmästarinna (senior lady-in-waiting) to the queen of Sweden, Sophia of Nassau, from 1880 to 1890.

She was the daughter of the nobleman Gustaf Reinhold von Platen and Christina von Stockenström. She married the courtier överstekammarjunkare (valet de chambre) count Axel Jakob De la Gardie (1819–1879) in 1845.

Malvina De la Gardie served as statsfru (lady of the Bedchamber) to Queen Louise in 1863-1871. She became a personal friend of Sophia of Nassau when the latter arrived in Sweden in 1857, and was therefore appointed to the position of överhovmästarinna (Mistress of the Robes) in 1880.

As senior lady-in-waiting, Malvina De la Gardie could represent the queen on minor social occasions and events. As queen Sophia seldom participated in high society life after the 1870s, preferring to devote her time to charity and religion, De la Gardie was often assigned to represent her at balls and similar events in high society life. She also acted as the queen's secretary in Sophia's substantial charitable projects, reading and answering petitions to the queen on charitable issues. She as well as Märta Eketrä accompanied the queen on their journey to Constantinople in 1885.

Malvina De la Gardie was described as a kind and well-tempered figure with a good-humoured disposition, who very much enjoyed court life and her own position in it:

"The Senior Lady in Waiting to the Queen, the countess De la Gardie, takes her office with an almost moving seriousness and interest. "Malvina", as she is commonly called, enjoys her court life, and would only leave it one day, I am sure, with death in her heart."

She retired for health reasons in 1890.

Court offices
Preceded by Elisabet Augusta Piper	Överhovmästarinna to the Queen of Sweden; 1880–1890	Succeeded by Ebba Åkerhielm
