= Charlotta Skjöldebrand =

Swedish artist (1791–1866)

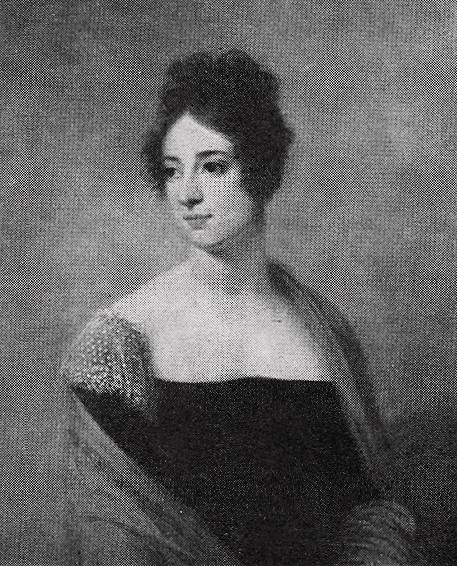
Charlotte Skjöldebrand

Charlotta Letitia Skjöldebrand (née Ennes; 29 June 1791 – 17 April 1866) was a Swedish court official. She served as senior lady-in-waiting (överhovmästarinna) to Queen Josefina from 1835 to 1866.

== Life ==
Skjöldebrand was the daughter of businessman Pehr Ennes (1753–1829) and Elisabet Margareta Brändström (1766–1822). She married Count Anders Fredrik Skjöldebrand (1757–1834) in 1811. She was the mother of artist and military officer Eric Bogislaus Skjöldebrand (1816-1868).

In 1836, she was appointed to succeed Elisabet Charlotta Piper (1787–1860), as senior lady-in-waiting to Crown Princess Josefina (1807–1876). She kept her office after the elevation of Queen Josefina in 1844 and into her widowhood in 1859.

Upon the succession of King Oscar I of Sweden in 1844, a number of reforms were introduced to subdue "the most spectacular pomp" and provocative grandeur of court life, and several courtly ceremonies, customs and rituals were abolished. Additionally, while the king allowed his mother the queen dowager to keep a full queen's household of the old standards and the use of the queen's apartments, most offices of both the king's and queen's household was left vacant for political reasons, and Skjöldebrand was to introduce the reforms at a queen's court where the posts of married ladies-in-waiting (statsfru) was left vacant, leaving her without a deputy, and with only maids-of-honour (hovfröken) to supervise. She was in service during the Union of Sweden-Norway, but only served in Sweden: during their visits in Norway, the royal family left their Swedish entourage at the border and was welcomed by their Norwegian court staff, and Charlotta Skjöldebrand thus turned over her duties to her Norwegian equivalent Fanny Løvenskiold at such occasions.

Emil Key (1822–1892) described her in 1864–65:

"One of these sons-in-law where count August Skiöldebrand. He was the son of the state secretary etc. A. F. Skiöldebrand. He has been brought to life to our epoch through the memoirs of Malla Silfverstolpe, as has his wife Laetitia Ennes. I saw her often during the winter of 1864–65, when I was basically at boarding house at the Åhlins, but spent my weekends and Sundays i the pleasant home of my aunt Ingeborg and uncle, the governor's residence at the royal palace. The elder countess Skiöldebrand's excellently beautiful youth portrait by Breda was displayed on the wall, but she was not more beautiful there than in the silvery haired old woman. Formerly the senior lady-in-waiting, she had funny court stories to tell and did not deny herself to spice them with many a charmingly performed expletive."

Skjöldebrand was active as an amateur painter.

Court offices
Preceded by Vilhelmina Gyldenstolpe	Överhovmästarinna to the Queen of Sweden; 1844–1859	Succeeded by Stefanie Hamilton
