= Elisabet Piper =

19th century Swedish court official

Elisabet Augusta Piper (1811–1879) was a Swedish court official. She served as överhovmästarinna (senior lady-in-waiting) to the queen of Sweden, Sophia of Nassau, from 1872 to 1879.

She was the daughter of the British admiral and nobleman Sir Thomas Baker and the Swedish noblewoman Sofia Augusta Ruuth. She married her cousin count Carl Erik Piper (1806–1875) in 1836.

She served as statsfru (lady of the Bedchamber) to queen Désirée in 1840-1850. She served as hovmästarinna (Senior lady-in-waiting) to crown princess Louise in 1850-1853, and succeeded as such by first Juliana Lovisa Posse and then Stefanie Hamilton. In 1872, after the accession of Oscar II, she was appointed Senior lady-in-waiting to the new queen, Sophia.

She was described as an example of the old decadent court life when she was converted on her deathbed by the newly religious queen to the teachings of the British preacher Lord Radstock.

Piper left a collection of papers from her long court career, consisting of descriptions of court rituals, court events, invitations and similar papers, which was donated to the Göteborgs museums handskriftssamling ('Gothenburg Museum of Written Documents') in 1880.

Court offices
Preceded by Anne-Malène Wachtmeister	Överhovmästarinna to the Queen of Sweden; 1872–1879	Succeeded by Malvina De la Gardie
