= Lotten Wennberg =

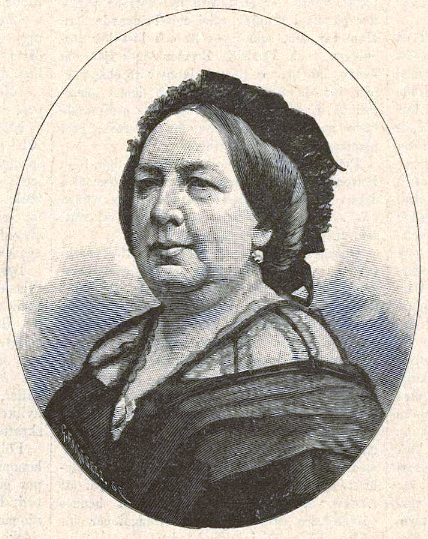
- Born: 3 June 1815; Stockholm, Sweden
- Died: 4 November 1864 (aged 49); Stockholm, Sweden
- Occupation: Philanthropist

Charlotta Christina "Lotten" Wennberg (3 June 1815 – 4 November 1864), was a Swedish philanthropist.

== Biography ==
Lotten Wennberg was born in Stockholm to wealthy landowner J. O. Wennberg. During her early life, she spent her winters in the capital, where she participated in society life, and her summers on Yxe Manor in Nora Mountain District, where she handed out supplies to the poor, as was expected from an upper-class woman. However, she expanded her activity and also started collections of funds to also provide the poor from neighboring parishes with supplies. In 1835, her father died: at the time of his death, his affairs were in disorder, and for a while, there was a risk that the family could go bankrupt. This did not happen, but the risk is said to have made her decide to make philanthropy her main task in life.

In Stockholm, she was constantly active in various charitable activities, providing homes for the homeless, health care for the sick, education for children, supplies for the starved, wood for the freezing, work for the unemployed, "with the same gravity, as if she had been appointed to this task by the state and awarded accordingly by salary". She was to have done this with great energy and good humor: in contrast to what was usual for a contemporary philanthropist, she did not combine her help with religious preaching, but it is known that she did ask for a review from the local parish about the character from the person in question before she agreed to help. Normally, Wennberg helped by simply applying for help in the appropriate poor care, but she did also ask for funds from private contributors and occasionally provided funds herself.

Wennberg was a member of the Jakobs- och Johannis' församlingars Fruntimmers-Skyddsförening (The Women's Protection Society of the Jacob's and John's Parishes) and several other of the charitable societies of the capital were women were admitted. During the cholera epidemic of Stockholm in 1853, she was the secretary in the St Jakobs församlingskomittée av den stora välgörenhetsförening för fattiga barn och nödlidande (The St Jakob Parish Committee of the Great Charity Society for Poor Children and the Needy), where she is described as the leading force by Fredrika Bremer, who was also a member.

Her charitable work was described by Fredrika Bremer and Emily Nonnen for Wilhelmina Stålberg, who included her in her dictionary of notable Swedish women in 1864. In 1864, Wennberg was granted H. M. The King's Medal for her work in Stockholm by king Charles XV of Sweden. She died in Stockholm of cancer. After her death, the queen, Louise of the Netherlands, founded the charity society Lotten Wennbergs fond för hjälpbehöfvande (The Lotten Wennberg Fund for the Needy) to her memory.
