= Helene Taube =

Baltic German noblewoman

Julie Helene (Ella) Taube af Karlö (1860–1930) was a Swedish (originally Baltic-German) noble and courtier. She served as the lady-in-waiting to the queen of Sweden, Victoria of Baden.

Taube was born in Estonia to the German-Baltic hakenrichtern baron Otto Fromhold Taube af Maydel af Karlö and Anna von Dellingshausen, and married the Swedish diplomat count Arvid Taube, ambassador to Berlin (1900–09) and foreign minister (1909–11), in 1884.

Reportedly, Taube played an important role at the Imperial German court in Berlin during the tenure of her spouse as ambassador. From 1916, she served as lady-in-waiting to the queen under Augusta Lewenhaupt. She was nicknamed "resefröken" (Miss Travel) because she was often chosen as the companion of the queen on her frequent travels. Taube was described as stiff and haughty, and was considered to exert a bad influence upon Victoria; though she was reliable and efficient in etiquette matters, it was said that she created "a certain coldness" in the atmosphere around the queen whenever she was in service.

== See also ==
- Cecilia af Klercker
