= Cecilia af Klercker =

Swedish court official (1869–1951)

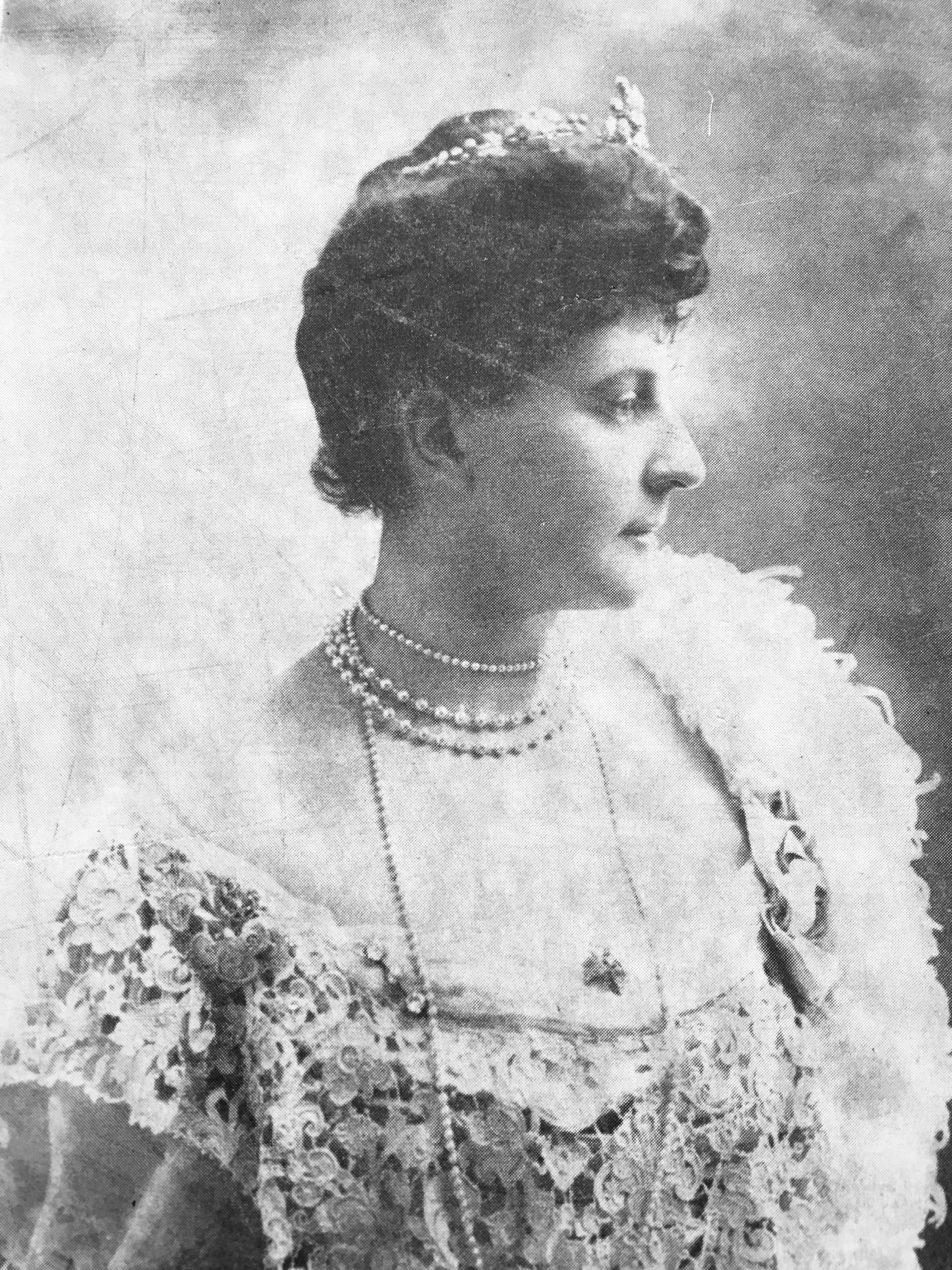
Cecilia af Klercker

Cecilia af Klercker née Lewenhaupt (1869 in Ericsberg Palace, Katrineholm Municipality – 1951) was a Swedish memoirist, translator and court official. She served as statsfru (lady of the Bedchamber) to the queen of Sweden, Victoria of Baden, from 1903 to 1930.

She was the daughter of courtier count Charles Adam Sixten Casimir Erik Lewenhaupt and Ingeborg Vilhelmina Sofia Charlotta Bonde. She married baron Henrik Vilhelm Falkenberg af Trystorp (1855–1901) in 1895, and the courtier nobleman Adolf Göran af Klercker in 1908. She was a personal and well liked confidant of the queen and was often chosen to accompany her on her many journeys.

She is known as the translator of the last parts (4–9, 1920–1942) of the famous journal of Hedvig Elisabeth Charlotte of Holstein-Gottorp, continuing the work begun by her uncle Carl Carlson Bonde. She also published her own memoirs of her life as a lady-in-waiting, Förgången glans : en drottnings statsfru berättar, 1944 (literary:'Former Splendour: the story of a lady-in-waiting of a queen').

== See also ==
- Helene Taube
