= Hilda Petrini =

Swedish clockmaker

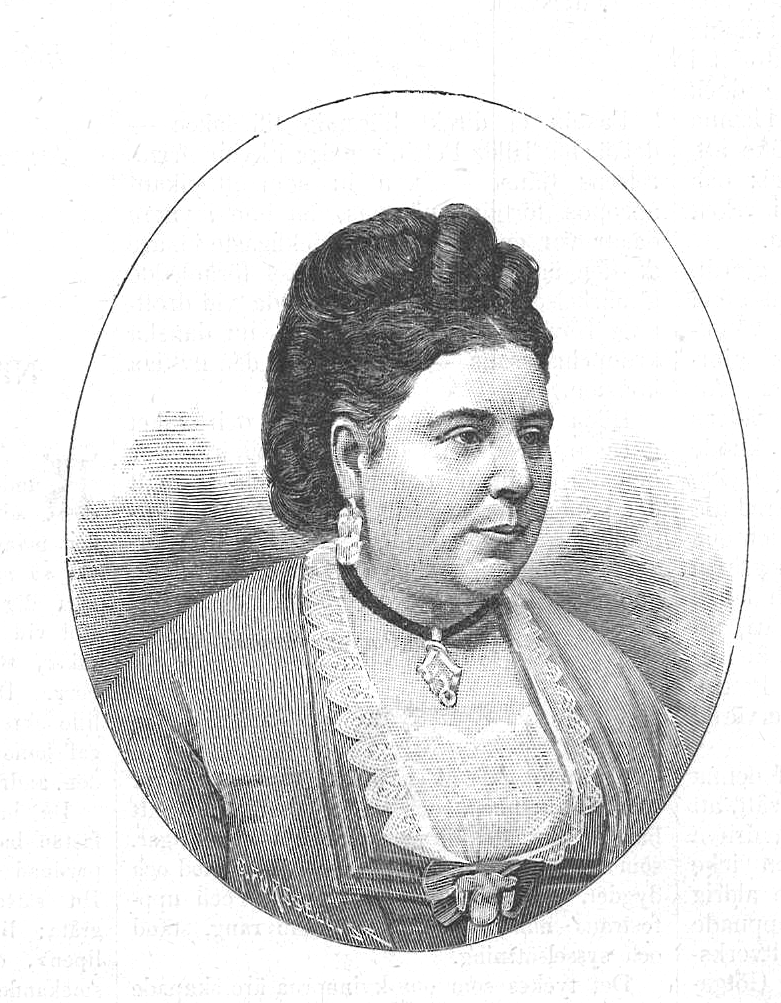
- Born: Hilda Catharina Petrini; 9 October 1838; Stockholm, Sweden
- Died: 30 January 1895 (aged 56); Stockholm, Sweden
- Occupation: Watchmaker

Hilda Catharina Petrini (9 October 1838, Stockholm – 30 January 1895, Stockholm) was a Swedish watchmaker, clock maker and businesswoman. She has been referred to as the first female master of mechanics of her country.

== Life and work ==
Hilda Petrini belonged to a wealthy old merchant family of Italian descent in Stockholm. During her youth, Petrini was a skilful swimmer and for a time assisted Nancy Edberg, who gave swimming lessons for Louise of the Netherlands and her daughter Louise of Sweden.

Even as a young girl, her affinity for mechanics was noticeable.

At that time [mechanics] was considered an unusual skill for a girl to master. Victor Söderberg, a manufacturer of chronometers, was at the family home on one occasion when he gave her some challenging mechanical exercises to do. Victor Söderberg was then amazed at the ease with which she completed them and immediately suggested that Hilda Petrini should train as a mechanic.

In 1858, at the age of 20, she began her studies as a student in mechanics under chronometer watch maker Victor Söderberg and completed her apprenticeship with good results. For a time, she was the assistant manager of the Söderberg factory.

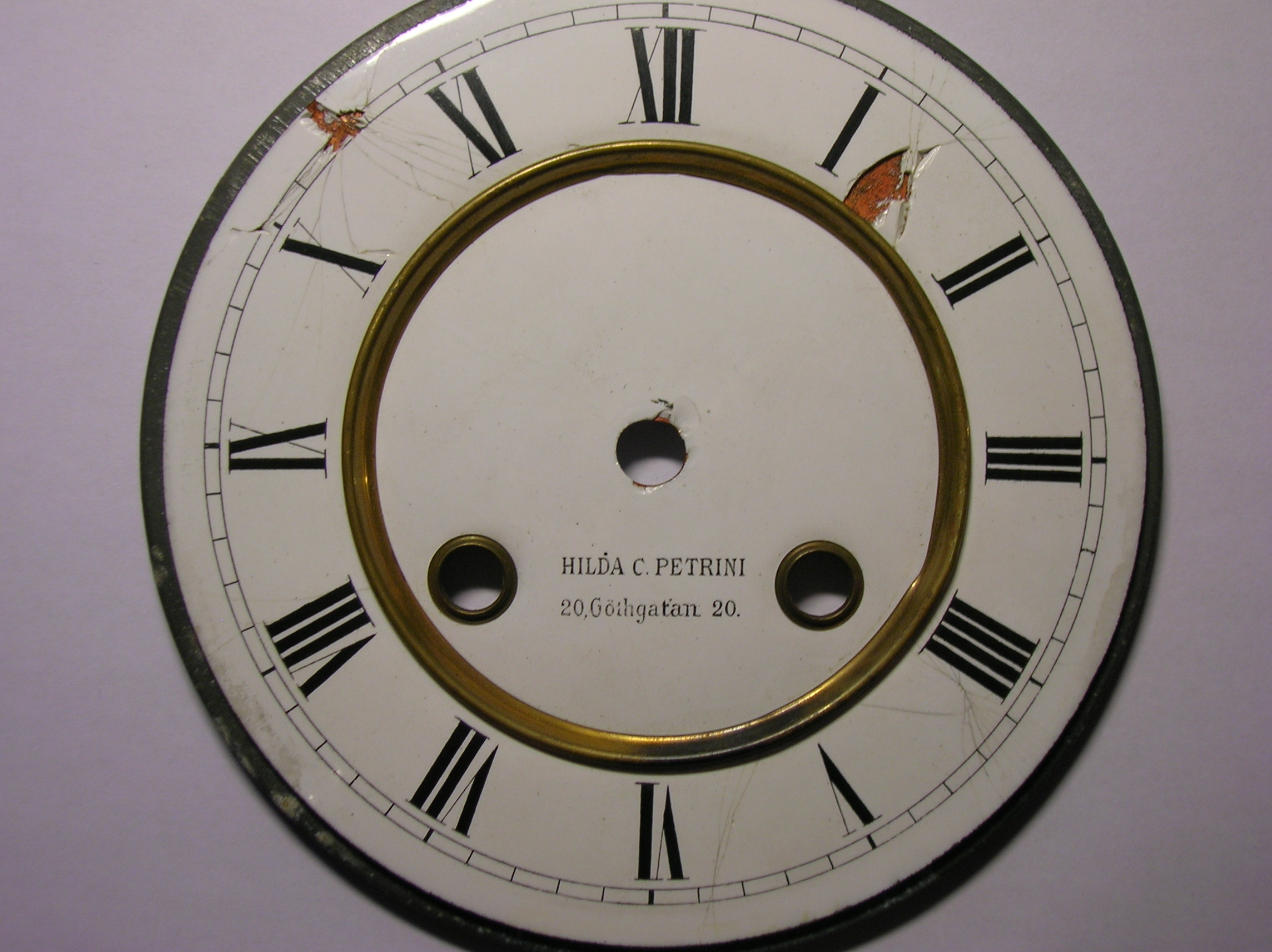
Clock face by Petrini

She was offered a position at the Royal Observatory, Greenwich, in London, but her parents did not wish for her to move so far away, so she declined.

In 1862, Petrini applied for a license to establish her own clock-making factory in Stockholm. She made her application to the association of handicrafts (still commonly referred to as guilds) in accordance with the Fabriks och Handtwerksordning. However, her application was controversial for the city guild: not because of her gender, but because of her combined gender and civil status, as the guild normally only issued licenses to widows, not unmarried women, although there was no law to forbid it. She was therefore denied a license, formally because of her age. Instead, her mother, then a widow, applied for the same license and was immediately granted one. Hilda Petrini thereby used her mother's license to open her own clock factory on 17 May 1862 at No. 20 Götgatan, one of the longest streets in central Stockholm. She was a successful and recommended craftswoman and trained apprentices of both genders.

Petrini became known not only as a skilled and scrupulous mechanic but also as a kind and warm-hearted woman who had an extensive social life. A long article about her and her work accompanied her image on the cover of Idun magazine (Number 7, 14 February 1890).

She died in Stockholm on 30 January 1895, at the age of 57, an event that was reported in national newspapers that recounted her work and success as groundbreaking for a woman.
