= Stefanie Hamilton =

Swedish court official (1819–1894)

Stefanie Fredrika Hamilton (1819–1894) was a Swedish court official. She served as överhovmästarinna, or senior lady-in-waiting, to Louise of the Netherlands, the crown princess and later queen of Sweden, from 1857 to 1860.

She was the daughter of councillor August Giesecke and Fredrika Theodora Wohlgenau. She married count Jakob Essen Hamilton in 1851. She succeeded countess Juliana Lovisa Posse (in office 1853-57, who in turned succeeded Elisabet Piper) as senior lady-in-waiting to Crown Princess Louise in 1857. Hamilton left office one the year following Louise's elevation to queen in 1859. Stefanie Hamilton was described as a personal friend and confidante of Louise. Their correspondence has been preserved and partially published.

Court offices
Preceded by Charlotta Skjöldebrand	Överhovmästarinna to the Queen of Sweden; 1859–1860	Succeeded by Wilhelmina Bonde
