= Ebba Åkerhielm =

19th-century Swedish court official

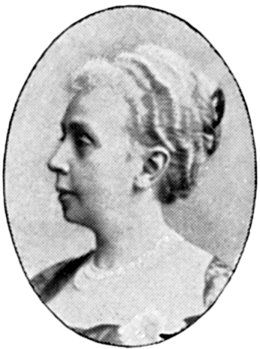
Ebba Åkerhielm

Countess Ebba Aurora Ulrika Åkerhielm af Margaretelund (née Gyldenstolpe 1841–1913) was a Swedish court official. She served as överhovmästarinna (senior lady-in-waiting) to the queen of Sweden, Sophia of Nassau, from 1890 to 1907.

She was the daughter of Count Adolf Fredrik Nils Gyldenstolpe and Countess Ebba Eleonora Brahe. She married prime minister Baron Gustaf Åkerhielm in 1860. In the 1870s, Fritz von Dardel described her as a jolly beauty and an eager participator in high society life, who was well received at court.

She was chairman of the board of the charitable foundation 'Kronprinsessans vårdanstalt för sjuka barn' ('Crown Princess' Nursing Institution for Sick Children') between 1885 and 1897.

In 1890, she was appointed to succeed Countess Malvina De la Gardie as senior lady-in-waiting to the queen. As the queen preferred to devote her time to charitable purposes and religious devotion, and also suffered from weak health, she was often given the task to represent the queen in high society.

After the death of her spouse in 1900, she took over the management of the Margretelund Mine.

Court offices
Preceded by Malvina De la Gardie	Överhovmästarinna to the Queen of Sweden; 1890–1907	Succeeded by Augusta Lewenhaupt
