= Nancy Edberg =

Swedish swimmer

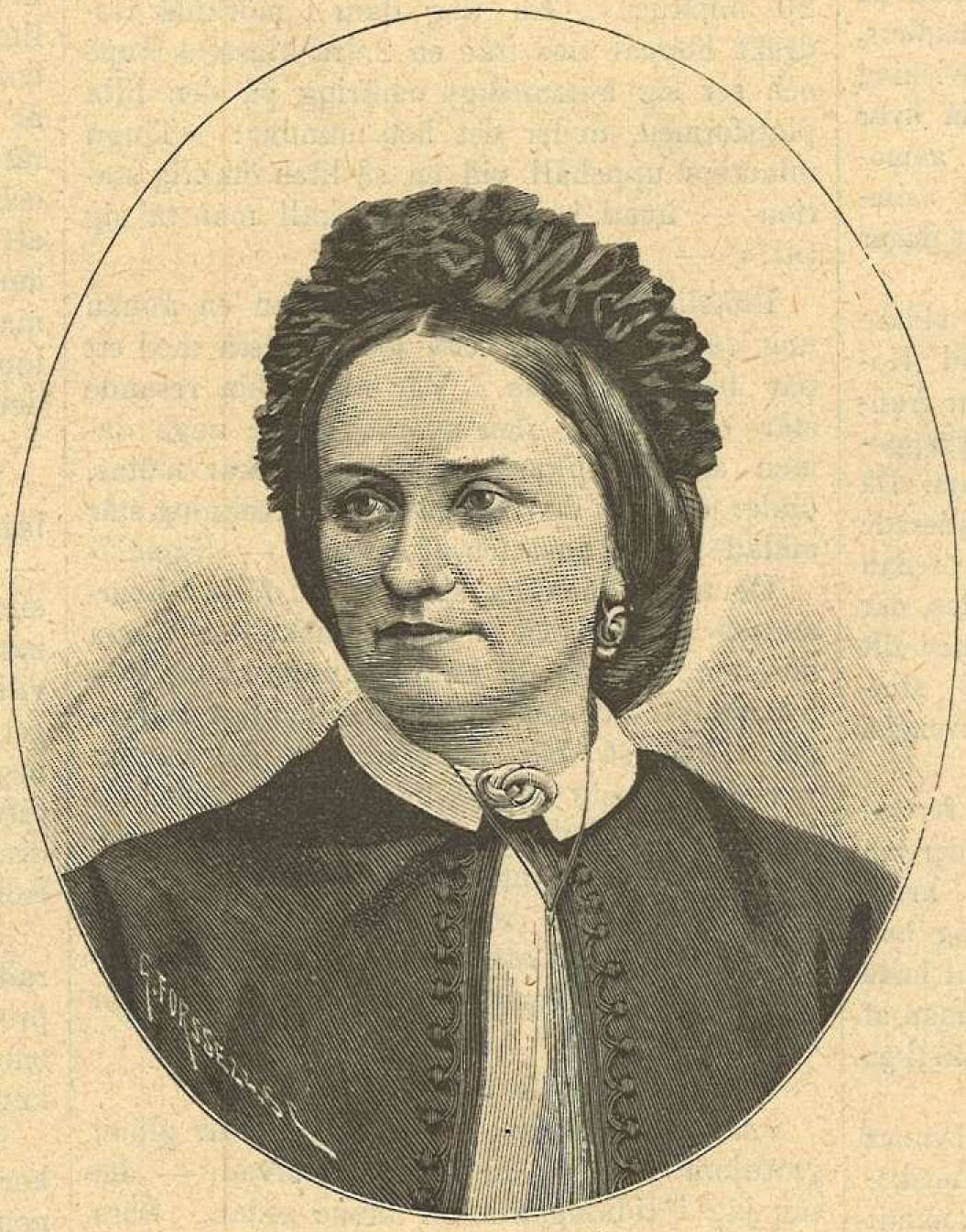
- Born: Nancy Fredrika Augusta Edberg; 12 November 1832; Ytterjärna
- Died: 11 December 1892 (aged 60); Stockholm
- Known for: Pioneer in the introduction of swimming and ice skating for women in Sweden and Europe
- Spouse: Carl Andrésen

Nancy Fredrika Augusta Edberg (12 November 1832 – 11 December 1892 in Stockholm) was a Swedish swimmer, swimming instructor and bath house manager director, the first Swedish woman to work in these fields. Edberg was a pioneer in making the art of swimming and ice skating acceptable as activities for women in Sweden.

== Early life ==
Nancy Edberg was born on 12 November 1832 in Ytterjärna, Södermanland, to Johanna Ulrica Edberg and Theodor Berg, a ticket-collector. She was taught to swim by her father. At this point, there was little physical education for women, one of few female role models being Gustafva Lindskog, who became the first Swedish instructor in physical education in 1818.

== Career ==
Nancy Edberg was employed as a swimming instructor at the newly founded bath house for women in Stockholm in 1847. This was the first bath house open to women in the country: first located at Riddarhuset, it was moved to Kastellholmen the following year. In 1851, she was made swimming master at Åbomska simskolan (Åbom Swimming School), and from 1853, she held her own swimming lessons at Djurgården. Her ideas met a strong degree of push back with comments including “does mademoiselle intend to drown people?”.

She was given the license to open her own bath house by King Oscar I of Sweden in 1856, and in 1856-1858, she held public swimming exhibitions at Gjörckes simskola (Gjörcke Swimming School) with her students to finance the opening of her own bath house. These are considered to be the first public swimming exhibitions by women in Sweden and, possibly, also Europe. She opened her own bath house in July 1859, and served as its swimming master until 1866.

Louise of the Netherlands, then Queen of Sweden, and her daughter Louise (later Queen of Denmark) were among Edberg's students between 1862 and 1864, assisted by Hilda Petrini. The art of swimming was initially not regarded as being entirely proper for women, but when the Queen and her daughter supported it by attending the lessons, swimming was quickly made fashionable and became accepted for women.

The same change of attitude happened when Edberg introduced lessons teaching women to ice skate (1864). This was initially considered so improper that a covered fence was put up around the place where the lessons took place to hide the women from public view. When the queen and her daughter themselves joined the class, ice skating quickly became fashionable and accepted for women, and the fence was pulled down. Among her other students in swimming was the Princess of Wales, Alexandra of Denmark, and the Empress of Russia, Maria Feodorovna (Dagmar of Denmark).

At the swimming exhibition at Gjörckes simskola in Stockholm on 24 August 1864 "Mamsell Nancy Edberg displayed her skill in the art of swimming".

In 1865, she introduced swimming for women in Oslo in Norway, and then travelled to Saint Petersburg in Russia on a scholarship and recommendation from the royal couple to the Russian Emperor and Empress. Edberg introduced swimming for women in Copenhagen, Trondhjem and a multitude of Swedish cities "from Ystad to Östersund".

== Personal life ==
She married the Danish lithographer Carl Andrésen (d. 1873) in 1867. Edberg was given a front page biography as a tribute for her pioneer work at the feminist publication Idun in 1890.

Nancy Edberg died age 60 in Stockholm on 11 December 1892.

== Image ==
- Image of Nancy Edberg
