= Lewenhaupt family =

Lewenhaupt
- Swedish noble family
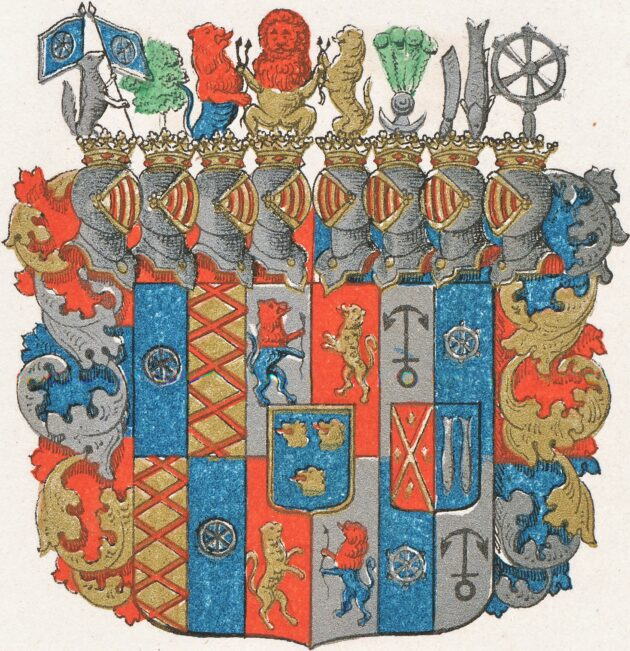
- Family coat of arms
- Country: Sweden

Lewenhaupt is the name of an old Swedish noble family, whose members occupied significant military and political positions in the Kingdom of Sweden.

== History ==
Lewenhaupt is the Germanized name of the Swedish Leijonhufvud noble family. They were granted baronial title in Sweden. The baronial branch was 1568 granted the title of Count. Branches of the family still exist in Sweden.

== Notable members ==
- Gustaf Adolf Lewenhaupt (1619–1656), Swedish soldier
- Adam Ludwig Lewenhaupt (1659–1719), Swedish general
- Charles Emil Lewenhaupt (1691–1743), Swedish general
- Wilhelmina Bonde, née Lewenhaupt (1817–1899), Swedish courtier
- Carl Lewenhaupt (1835–1906), Swedish diplomat and politician
- Carl Gustaf Sixtensson Lewenhaupt (1879–1962), Swedish horse rider and modern pentathlete
- Carl Gustaf Moritz Thure Lewenhaupt (1884–1935), Swedish horse rider who competed in the 1920 Summer Olympics
- Carl Adam Lewenhaupt (1947–2017), Swedish count
