= Aurore von Haxthausen =

Swedish author, composer, and pianist (1830–1888)

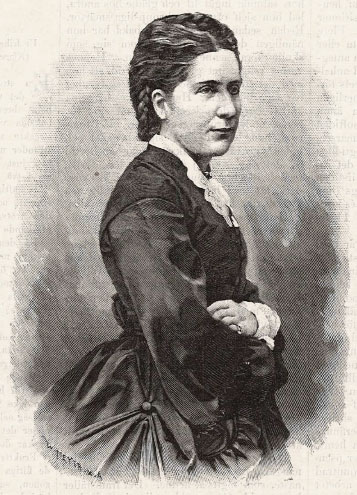
- Born: August 15, 1830; Velinga parish, Sweden
- Died: February 7, 1888 (aged 57); Stockholm, Sweden
- Other name: Klara Kuhlman
- Occupations: Lady-in-waiting, composer, writer, pianist

Aurore von Haxthausen (Gustava Charlotta Märta Aurora: 1830 – 7 February 1888), known also by her artist pseudonym as Klara or Clara Kuhlman, was a Swedish author, composer, pianist and lady in waiting. She composed a march that was played at the opening of Parliament for some years, and wrote several novels.

== History ==
Von Haxthausen was born in Daretorp in Västergötland, the daughter of the State Councillor (swedish: statsråd) and Governor (swedish: landshövding) of Halland County, Baron Carl Henrik Gyllenhaal and Aurore af Nordin. Her father died during a cholera outbreak in 1857, and it was after that that von Haxthausen was appointed as a lady-in-waiting to the Crown Princess. von Haxthausen married in 1873 to the Danish noble at the Danish legation in Stockholm, Frederik Ferdinand von Haxthausen.

From 1857 until 1871, she was a favored maid of honor and confidante of the Swedish queen, Louise of the Netherlands. She was known at court for her wittiness and talent for cheering people up as well as for her piano improvisations: a typical episode of all these qualities was when she, at one occasion when Louisa had reprimanded a chamber maid, eased the tension by improvising the whole episode on piano.

Aurore von Haxthausen wrote several compositions for piano which was given on public concerts, although few of her compositions were written down. One of them, a marchm was, for several years, often played during the annual opening of parliament. She also published a collection of novels: Från svenska hem (1883–84). Her writing is mostly based around her childhood memories. She died in Stockholm in 1888 and is buried at Solna cemetery. Her composition Vid lifvets afton was played at her funeral.

== Selected works ==
- Från svenska hem: pennritningar / af Klara Kuhlmann. Stockholm: Seligmann. 1883. Libris 1597523 (Swedish language)
- Från svenska hem: pennritningar : ny samling / af Klara Kuhlmann. Stockholm: Seligmann. 1884. Libris 1597524 (Swedish language)
