= Louise Rålamb =

Swedish court official

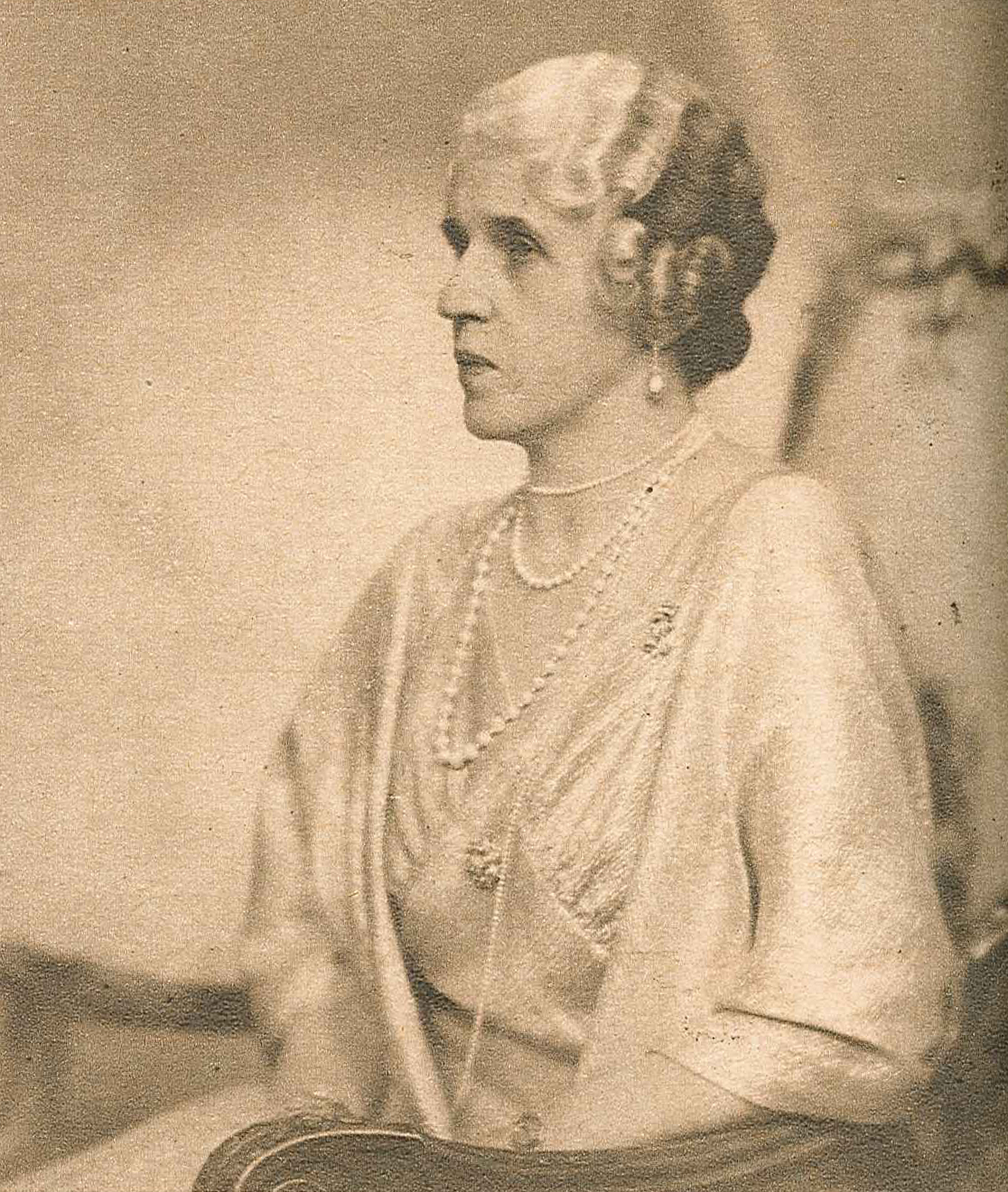
Louiser Rålamb, c.1942(or earlier)

Louise Rålamb (1875–1967) was a Swedish court official.

She served as överhovmästarinna (senior lady-in-waiting) at the Swedish Royal Court from 1938 to 1956.

Court offices
Preceded by Augusta Lewenhaupt	Överhovmästarinna; 1938–1956	Succeeded by Astrid Rudebeck
