= Trolle-Ljungby Castle =

- Trolle-Ljungbys slott
- Kristianstad Municipality
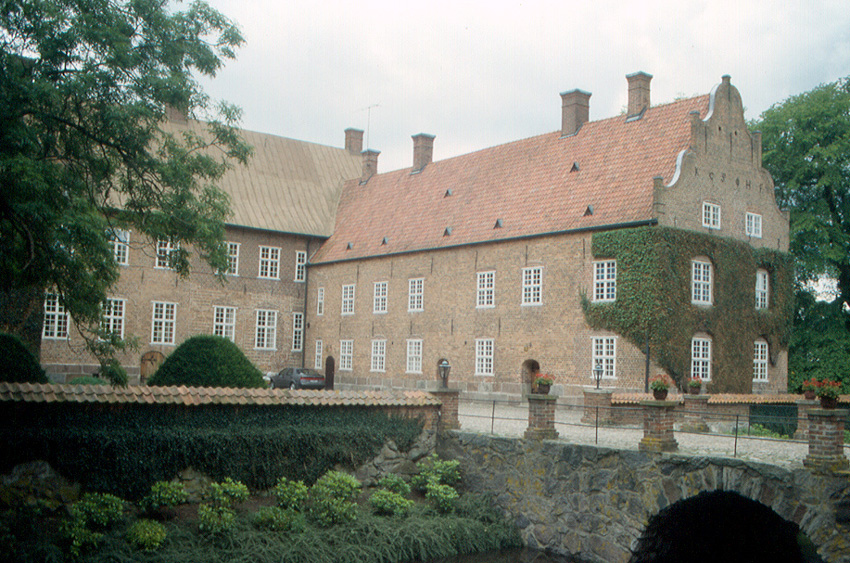
- Trolle-Ljungby Castle

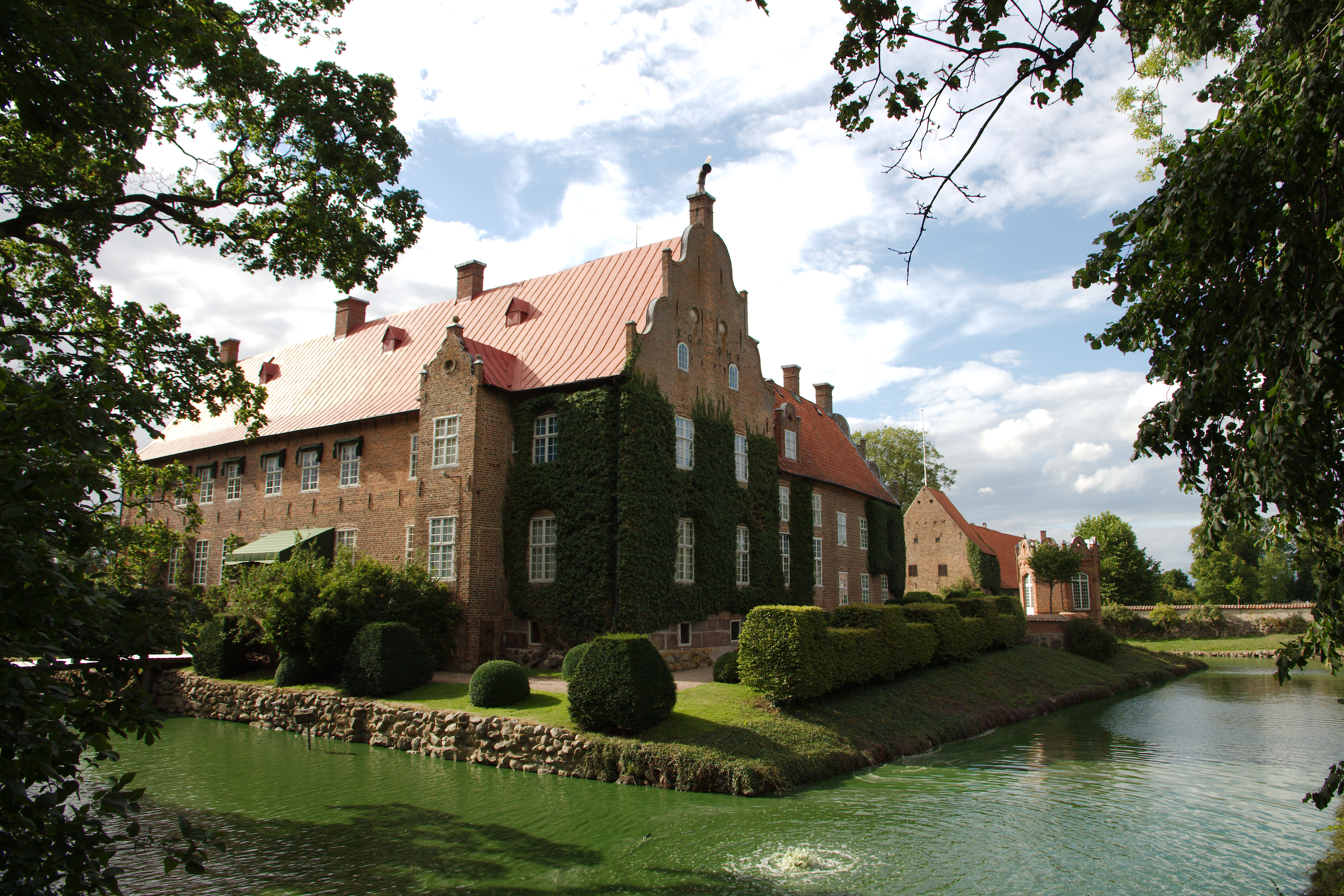
- View from across the moat

Site information
- Type: Castle
- Open to the public: No

Location
- Scania, Sweden
- Coordinates: 56.0218°N 14.3699°E

Site history
- Built: present form c. 1621
- Built by: Knud Gyldenstierne
- Battles/wars: 1525 insurrection of Søren Norby; Scanian War

Trolle-Ljungby Castle (Swedish: Trolle-Ljungby slott) is a castle in Kristianstad Municipality, Scania, in southern Sweden. The Renaissance style castle is enclosed by a moat.

== History ==
The castle is of medieval origins. It is mentioned as belonging to the Danish noble "Bille" family during the 14th and 15th centuries. In the 1460s, it was sold to Jens Holgersen Ulfstand, a Danish politician, admiral and county governor, who is famous for having commissioned the building of Glimmingehus, one of the best-preserved medieval manors in Scandinavia.

Little is known about the early history of the castle, but the western part is thought to be the oldest. Large reconstruction works were carried out after 1621 and it was at this time that the current Renaissance exterior was conceived. A drawing suggest that by 1680 the castle was more or less the same shape as it is now. In the wake of the Swedish conquest of Scania from Denmark and the following Scanian War, the castle was involved in the fighting and damaged by raiding Snapphanar or guerrilla fighters. Bullet holes and cutting marks in the tower door, from this conflict, are still visible. In the following years the castle was repaired and a defensive gate house was built.

The castle park was visited by Carl Linnaeus in 1749.

In 1850, the house came into the possession of Hans Gabriel Trolle-Wachtmeister, the ancestor of the current owners, who initiated reconstruction works both internally and externally.

The current owner of the castle is Count Hans-Gabriel Trolle-Wachtmeister, married to Countess Alice Trolle-Wachtmeister, the Swedish Mistress of the Robes, until her death in 2017.

== Architecture ==
The castle consists of three wings surrounding a courtyard, located on a small island surrounded by a moat. Its style is an accomplished form of Danish Renaissance. Close to the castle lies Trolle-Ljungby Church. Internally, the castle retains few of the original furnishings but has richly decorated Rococo and Neoclassical rooms, including one of the finest private libraries in Sweden.

== Trolle-Ljungby horn and pipe ==
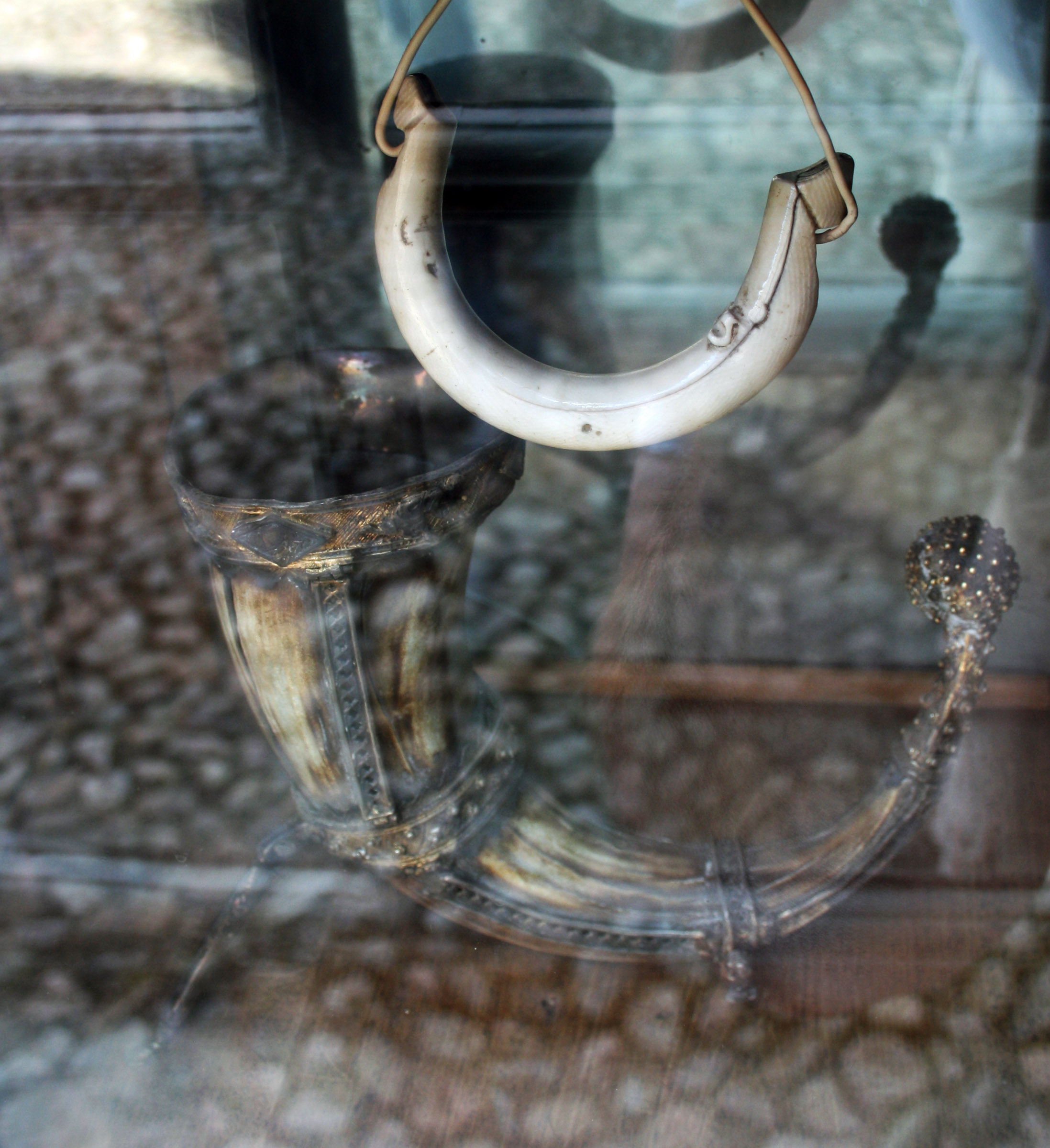
The legendary horn and pipe

Among the castle's collections are a medieval drinking horn and a hunting flute or pipe, also of considerable age. These two objects, which (in summertime) are displayed in a window of the castle, are tied to an old legend which was first recorded in 1620. According to this legend, trolls used to congregate under a large erratic boulder, which is still on the estate. Sissela Ulfstand, lady of the manor in the mid-1500s, wanted to know what happened at the boulder and sent one of her men to investigate. When he arrived he found the trolls holding a feast under the boulder, which was raised on a golden column. They asked him to drink to the troll chieftain, handing him the horn, and to play on the flute. However, a maiden managed to warn him not to drink, and to ride home across the fields where the trolls could not reach him. He poured the contents of the horn out over his shoulder, scorching the side of his horse, and galloped across the fields to the castle, bringing the horn and flute with him. The trolls later demanded that Sissela Ulfstand return it, but she refused. Angered, they put a curse on her and the castle, saying that the castle would be burnt three times and her family die out. They also warned that the horn and pipe must never leave the castle. Much folklore has arisen concerning the curse; it is a fact, however, that the castle burned down during the lifetime of Sissela Ulfstand, during a failed rebellion attempt by Søren Norby.
