= Fritz Wedel Jarlsberg =

Norwegian aristocrat, jurist and diplomat (1855–1942)

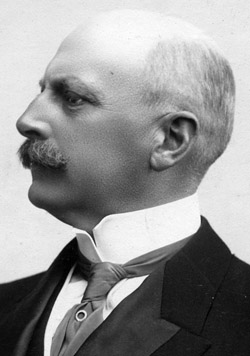

Norwegian-Swedish Minister in Madrid
- In office 1891–1897 and 1902–1905

Personal details
- Born: 7 July 1855 Christiania, Norway
- Died: 27 July 1942 (aged 87)
- Spouse(s): Alice Thekla Louise von Wagner; Mary von André
- Parents: Baron Frederik Joachim Wedel Jarlsberg (father); Juliane Wedel Jarlsberg (mother)
- Education: University of Christiania
- Occupation: jurist and diplomat

Baron Frederik (Fritz) Hartvig Herman Wedel Jarlsberg (7 July 1855 – 27 July 1942) was a Norwegian aristocrat, jurist and diplomat.

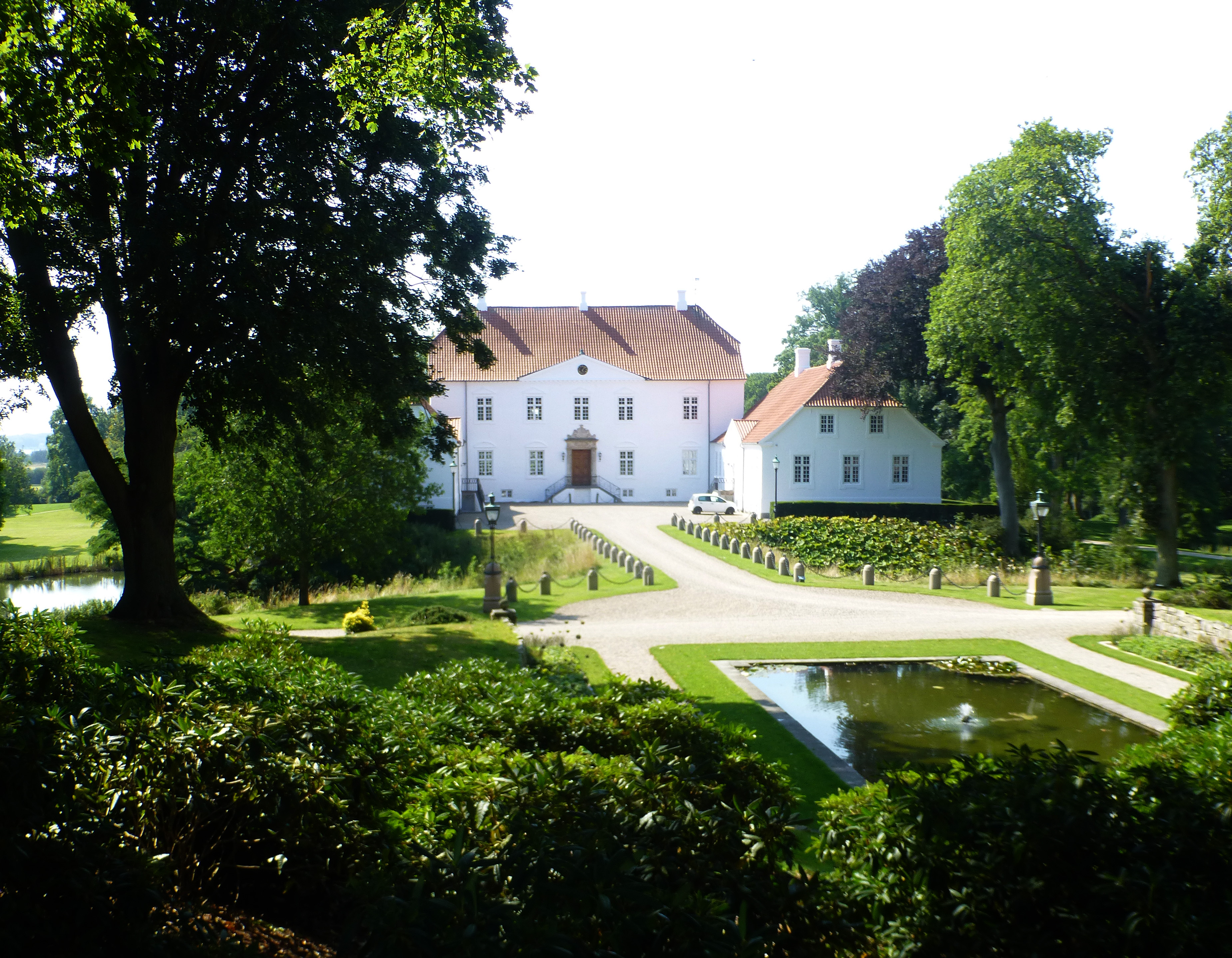
Palsgård on Jutland

== Biography ==
Fredrik Wedel Jarlsberg was born in Christiania (now Oslo), Norway. He was the son of Baron Frederik Joachim Wedel Jarlsberg and Baroness Juliane Wedel Jarlsberg. On both his father's and mother's side, he was a member of a branch of Norway's foremost nobility. He maintained the title of baron in Denmark, which had not abolished nobility titles following the separation of Denmark-Norway. Earlier in Norway, his family was officially recognised as barons.

He studied law at the University of Christiania and graduated Cand.jur. in 1879. He first became a professor and then entered diplomacy service. He was Norwegian-Swedish Minister in Madrid 1891–1897 and 1902–1905. In 1882 Wedel became secretary of the Ministry of Foreign Affairs in Stockholm. He came to Vienna in 1885 and in 1888 to London as Chargé d'affaires. He became a Swedish-Norwegian minister in the Spanish court in 1891. He was active in Norwegian-Swedish diplomacy and played a central role in the 1905 dissolution of the union between these countries. He was offered the post as minister of foreign affairs three times. He played a key role in securing the Svalbard Treaty of 1920, which granted Norway sovereignty over Svalbard. Jarlsberg also attempted to acquire German East Africa as colony/mandate for Norway, citing Germany's obligation to reimburse Norway for its lost shipping in World War I. However, despite support from some British negotiators, nothing came of this project, and German East Africa was instead divided between Belgium, Portugal, and the United Kingdom.

On the 17th of April 1906, he is accredited the first Ambassador of Sweden to France.

From 1898 to 1908, he established residence at Palsgård on the east coast of the Jutland. In his time as owner, a large park was built between 1898 and 1900 by the English landscape architect Edward Milner. In 1908 he sold Palsgård and in 1909 he bought Skaugum in Asker.The estate had a large main building, which Wedel redesigned in French architectural style. He donated it to Crown Prince Olav at the time of his wedding to Princess Märtha of Sweden in 1929.

== Personal life ==
Wedel Jarlsberg was married twice. In 1883 he married Alice Thekla Louise von Wagner, who was a member of one of Germany's industrial families. In 1916, as a widower, he married an American heiress, Mary von André, née Palmer.

He was the author of Reisen gjennem Livet (1932) and 1905 og Kongevalget (1946). He became a knight of the Order of St. Olav in 1892 and also held a number of foreign orders. Wedel Jarlsberg Land on the southwestern part of Spitsbergen in Svalbard is named after him.

While he was posted to Paris, he and his wife acquired a private residence in the city. At his retirement in 1930, they simply kept on living in Paris instead of moving back to either of their home countries. In 1940, when the German forces invaded France, he and his wife relocated to Lisbon, Portugal, where he was widowed for the second time in 1941, and died in 1942.

== See also ==
- Wedel-Jarlsberg
