= Alice Trolle-Wachtmeister =

Swedish countess (1926–2017)

Alice Countess Trolle-Wachtmeister
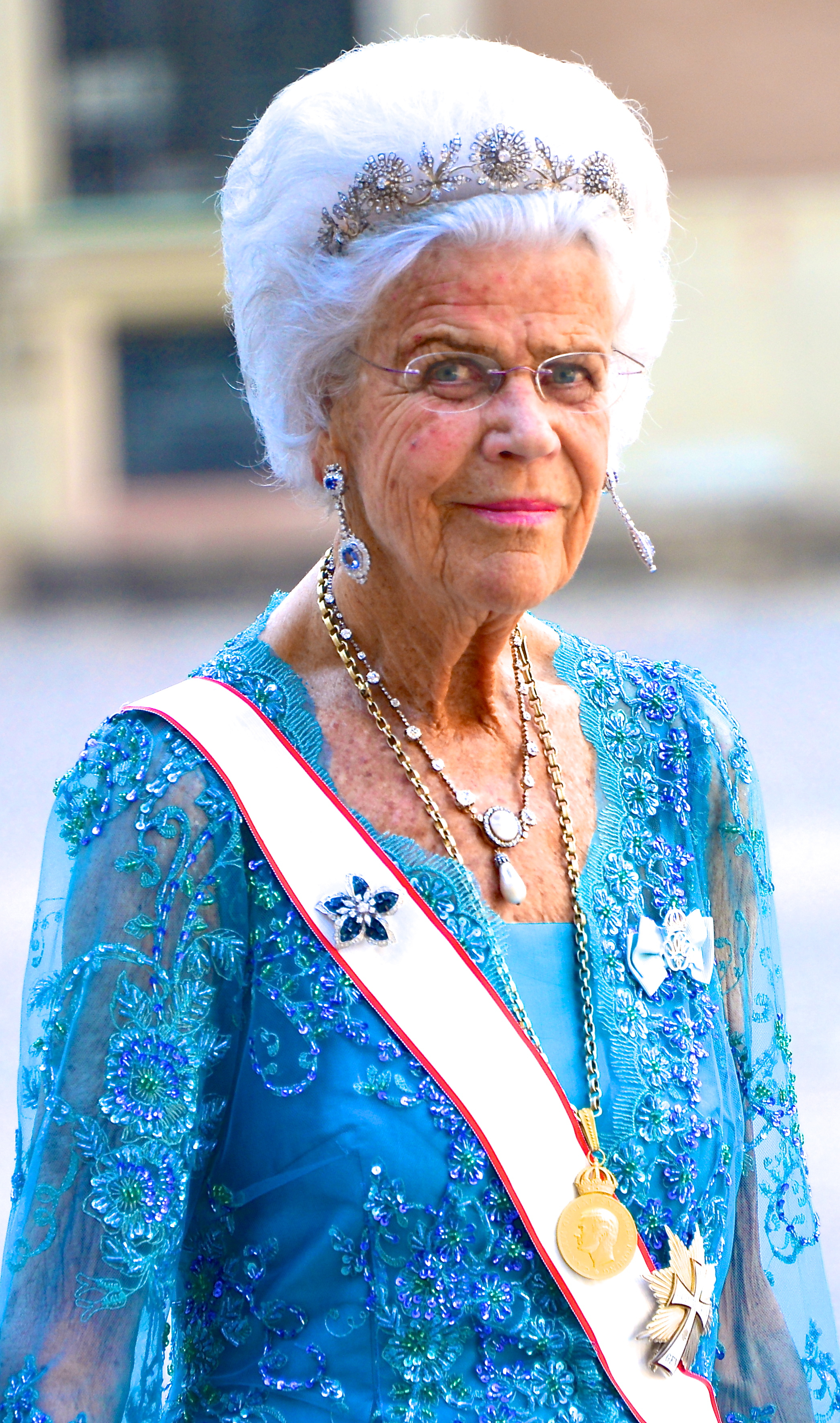

Chief Court Mistress
- In office 1994 – 31 December 2015
- Monarch: Carl XVI Gustaf
- Preceded by: Astrid Rudebeck
- Succeeded by: Kirstine von Blixen-Finecke

Statsfru
- In office 1978–1993
- Succeeded by: Louise Lyberg

Personal details
- Born: Alice Tornérhielm; 9 May 1926 Helsingborg, Sweden
- Died: 26 June 2017 (aged 91) Trolle-Ljungby Castle, Sweden
- Spouse: Count Hans Gabriel Trolle-Wachtmeister (m. 1949)

Countess Alice Viktoria Trolle-Wachtmeister (9 May 1926 – 26 June 2017) was a courtier at the Royal Court of Sweden from the 1970s to 2015, serving as chief court mistress from 1994 to 2015.

== Early life and education ==
Alice Viktoria Tornérhielm was born on 9 May 1926 in Helsingborg, the daughter of Erik Gunnar Tornérhielm (1895–1969), a squire from Gedsholm, and the Danish-born Ellen Valentiner-Branth (1897–1965). As a child, Trolle-Wachtmeister was often ill and lived for a long time in a sanatorium with a nurse in her mother's home country, Denmark. When she returned home to Gedsholm outside Helsingborg, she spoke only Danish. During her early school years, she lived in a boarding house in Helsingborg. Seventeen years old in 1943, she followed her mother's example and joined the Swedish Women's Voluntary Defence Organization. After school graduation in 1945, she undertook home education which her father regarded as his daughter's military service. Then followed a nursing course with internship at a children's hospital, a practical social course in Copenhagen 1945–1947, a period in an English family and a time as a hostess. In 1947 she graduated from child care nurse training. Trolle-Wachtmeister then engaged in the Swedish Red Cross and in the Church Sewing Association.

== Career ==
She was trained in air defense and staff welfare services in the Swedish Air Force. Trolle-Wachtmeister was vice chief and then chief of the Swedish Women's Voluntary Defence Organization in Kristianstad County from 1962 to 1968 and from 1968 to 1974 respectively. She passed a management course at the Swedish National Defence College in 1974 and was chairman of the board of the Swedish Women's Voluntary Defence Organization and its chief from 1974 to 1978. Trolle-Wachtmeister was chairman of Sveriges unglottor from 1974 to 1978, when she became a statsfru, a high ranking court official. She served as such until 1994, when she was promoted to the office of the Chief Court Mistress, succeeding Astrid Rudebeck. As such, she was the highest ranking non-royal woman in Sweden.

Trolle-Wachtmeister was chairman of the municipal council from 1964 to 1976 and a member of the Temperance Board (Nykterhetsnämnden) and of the county council's Social Welfare Board (Socialnämnd) from 1970. She was also chairman of the Church Council, member of the Church Board, the Sophiahemmet Foundation (Sophiahemmets stiftelse), the Foundation of the Queen Silvia Jubilee Fund (Stiftelsen Drottning Silvias jubileumsfond), and chairman of the Foundation of Queen Victoria's Nursing Home (Stiftelsen Drottning Victorias vilohem) from 1984.

On 23 February 2012, along with Prime Minister Fredrik Reinfeldt, the Speaker of the Parliament Per Westerberg and the Marshal of the Realm Svante Lindqvist, Countess Trolle-Wachtmeister was presented the newborn Princess Estelle, Duchess of Östergötland. According to tradition, the Mistress of the Robes and the other officials are required to witness that the second in the line of succession to the throne is indeed the child of the Crown Princess, rather than a changeling. She then attended the announcement of the Princess's names on 24 February.

== Personal life ==
In 1949, Alice Tornérhielm married Count Hans-Gabriel Trolle-Wachtmeister (9 January 1923 – 9 November 2023), the son of first hovjägmästare, Count Carl-Axel Trolle-Wachtmeister and Hilla-Brita (née Trolle). Hans-Gabriel was a member of the Trolle-Wachtmeister family, with whom she lived at Trolle-Ljungby Castle in Scania.

== Distinctions ==
=== National ===
- (Sweden) Member 1st Class of the Royal Order of Vasa (6 June 1974)
- (Sweden) Member of the Royal Family Order of King Carl XVI Gustaf
- (Sweden) H. M. The King's Medal, 12th size gold medal worn around the neck on a chain of gold (silver-gilt) (1990)
- (Sweden) H. M. The King's Medal, 12th size gold (silver-gilt) medal worn around the neck on the Order of the Seraphim ribbon (1983)
- (Sweden) King Carl XVI Gustaf's Jubilee Commemorative Medal II (23 August 2013)
- (Sweden) Crown Princess Victoria and Prince Daniel's Wedding Commemorative Medal (8 June 2010)
- (Sweden) King Carl XVI Gustaf's Jubilee Commemorative Medal I (30 April 1996)
- (Sweden) Swedish Home Guard Medal of Merit in gold (6 June 1978)
- (Sweden) Swedish Women's Voluntary Defence Organization Royal Medal of Merit

=== Foreign ===
- (Norway) Grand Cross of the Royal Norwegian Order of Merit (1 July 1992)
- (Iceland) Grand Cross of the Order of the Falcon (26 October 1981)
- (Denmark) Knight Grand Cross of the Order of the Dannebrog
- (Argentina) Grand Cross of the Order of the Liberator General San Martín (18 May 1998)
- (Spain) Dame Grand Cross of the Order of Isabella the Catholic (21 March 1983)
- (Spain) Band of Lady of the Order of Civil Merit (15 October 1979)
- (Luxembourg) Knight Grand Cross of the Order of Adolphe of Nassau
- (Netherlands) Knight Grand Cross of the Order of Orange-Nassau (11 May 1987)
- (Portugal) Grand Cross of the Order of Prince Henry (13 January 1987)
- (Thailand) Knight Grand Cross of the Order of the White Elephant
- (Estonia) 1st Class of the Order of the White Star (11 September 1995)
- Order of the White Rose of Finland
- (Mexico) Order of the Aztec Eagle
- (Brazil) Brazilian Congress' Order
- (Japan) Order of the Sacred Treasure

Court offices
Preceded by Astrid Rudebeck	Chief Court Mistress; 1994–2015	Succeeded by Kirstine von Blixen-Finecke
