= H. M. The King's Medal =

H. M. The King's Medal H.M. Konungens medalj
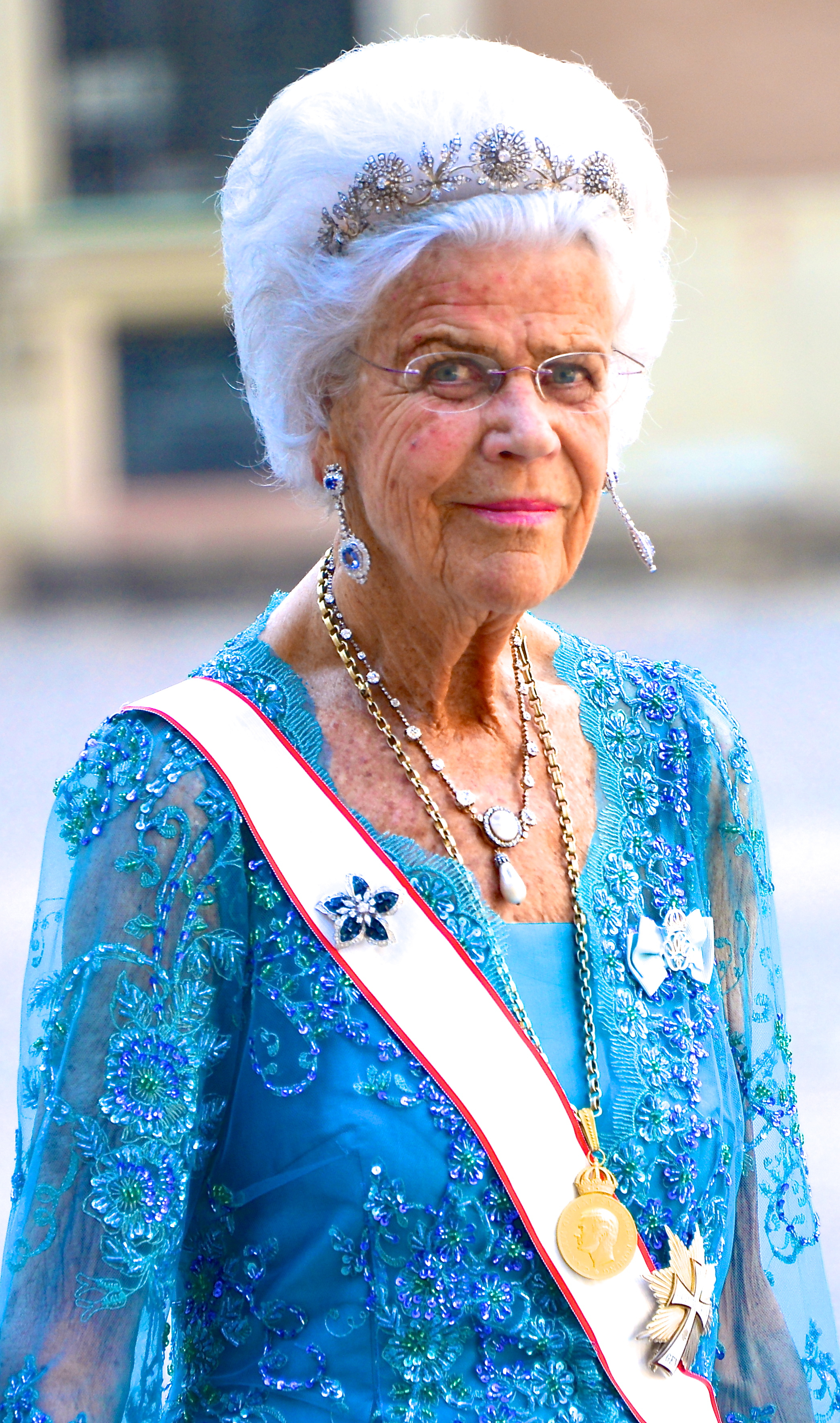
- Countess Alice Trolle-Wachtmeister wearing H. M. The King's Medal 12th size on gold chain
- Type: Royal medal
- Awarded for: Special merits as well as service at the royal court
- Country: Sweden
- Presented by: the King of Sweden
- Eligibility: Swedes and foreigners
- Status: Currently awarded
- Established: 1814

Precedence
- Next (higher): Seraphim Medal
- Next (lower): Litteris et Artibus

H. M. (His Majesty) The King's Medal (Swedish: H.M. Konungens medalj), earlier known as the Court Medal (Swedish: Hovmedaljen), is a Swedish honour that may be bestowed upon Swedish and foreign citizens. The medal was created in 1814 and is awarded in different sizes in gold and silver with chain or ribbon. This medal is not awarded in classes but in sizes. The 12th size is the largest and is worn around the neck on a chain or ribbon. The 8th and 5th size are worn from the left breast suspended by a ribbon, after the Seraphim Medal.

It is awarded to Swedish and foreign citizens for special merits as well as to officials at the royal court. This was especially the case since 1975, when Swedish Orders of Chivalry ceased to be conferred upon non-royal Swedish citizens, until the Orders were open to Swedish citizens again from 1 February 2023.

== Medals ==
H.M. The King's Medal is awarded in various sizes in both gold and silver. It may be suspended from a ribbon or chain. Swedish medals are not awarded in classes but are awarded in sizes. These sizes come from the Berch's Scale from the 18th century. This scale assigns various sizes to medals. For example, the 12th size medal is 43 mm in diameter, while the 8th size is 31 mm in diameter. The medal may be awarded in the following sizes and suspensions:

- 12th size gold medal with diamonds worn around the neck on a chain of gold (silver-gilt)
- 12th size gold medal worn around the neck on a chain of gold (silver-gilt)
- 12th size gold (silver-gilt) medal worn around the neck on the Order of the Seraphim ribbon
- 12th size gold (silver-gilt) medal worn around the neck on a blue ribbon
- 8th size gold (silver-gilt) medal worn on the chest suspended by the Order of the Seraphim ribbon
- 8th size gold (silver-gilt) medal worn on the chest suspended by a blue ribbon
- 8th size silver medal worn on the chest suspended by a blue ribbon

== Notable recipients ==
12th size gold medal with diamonds in chain

- Prince Bertil, Duke of Halland
- Princess Christina, Mrs. Magnuson

12th size gold medal with chain

- Thorbjörn Fälldin
- Johan Hederstedt
- Alf Svensson
- Stig Synnergren
- Håkan Syrén
- Alice Trolle-Wachtmeister
- Bertil Werkström
- Carl Bildt
- Sverker Göranson
- Stefan Löfven

12th size gold medal on Seraphim Order ribbon

- Adolf H. Lundin
- Baron Niclas Silfverschiöld
- Anitra Steen
- Alice Trolle-Wachtmeister

12th size gold medal on Bright-Blue ribbon

- Niklas Zennström
- Hans Ellegren
