= Hans Ellegren =

Swedish Environmental biologist and Geneticist

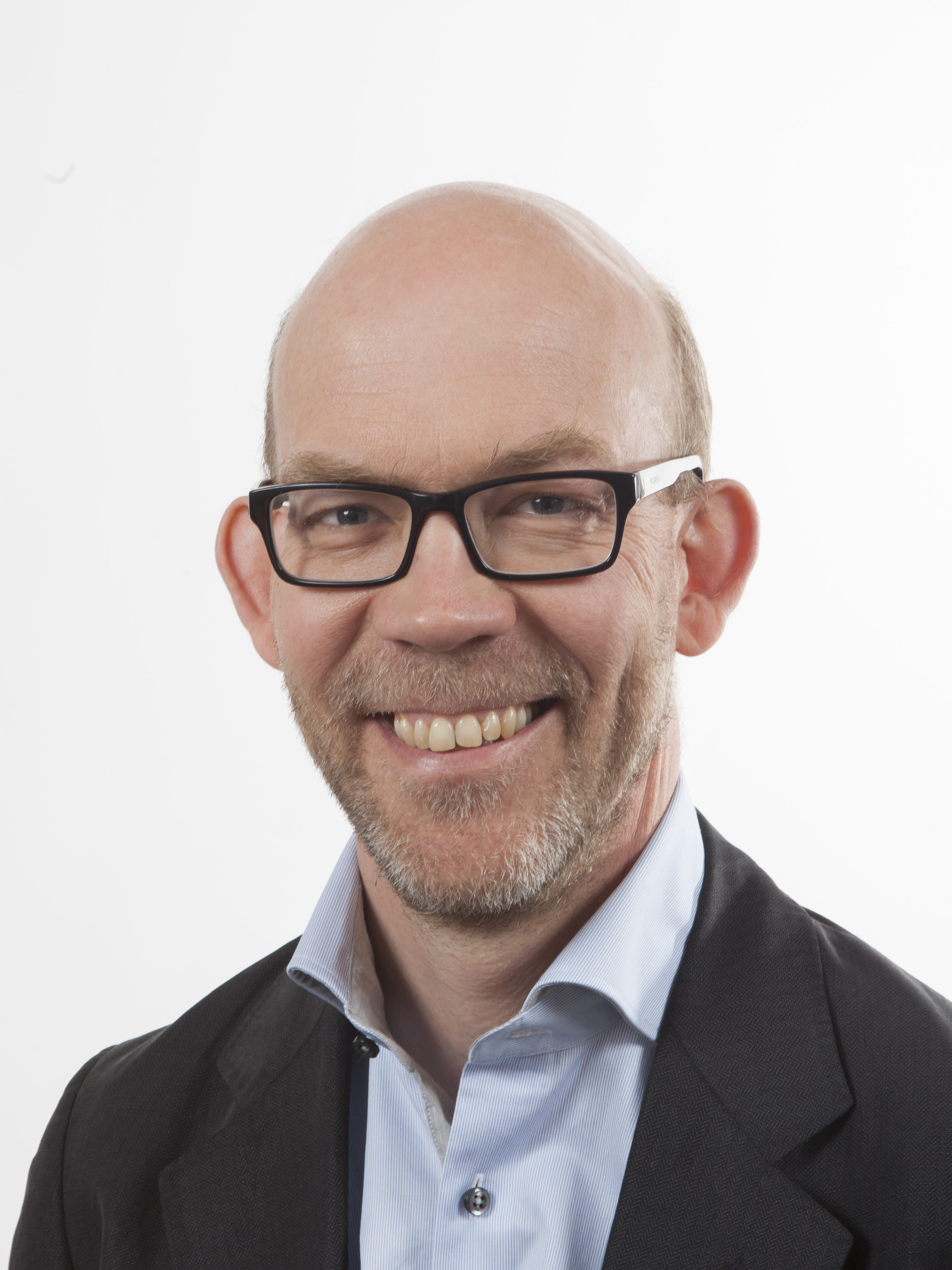
- Born: 9 September 1962 (age 63); Gävle, Sweden
- Education: Swedish University of Agricultural Sciences
- Known for: Bioinformatics, Microsatellite, Evolutionary biology, Genetics
- Awards: H.M.The King's Medal
- Scientific career
- Fields: Evolutionary biology, Genetics
- Website: https://www.kva.se/en/contact/hans-ellegren-2/

Hans Ellegren is Secretary General of Royal Swedish Academy of Sciences, and Professor of Evolutionary biology and Genetics at Uppsala University.

== Publications ==
Ellegren has published more than 300 research articles.

== Membership in Academies ==
Ellegren is a member of Royal Swedish Academy of Sciences (2010), the Norwegian Academy of Science and Letters (2015), and the European Molecular Biology Organization (2015). He is on the board of directors of the Royal Swedish Academy of Sciences, and a board member of the Nobel Prize.
