= Astrid Rudebeck =

Swedish court official

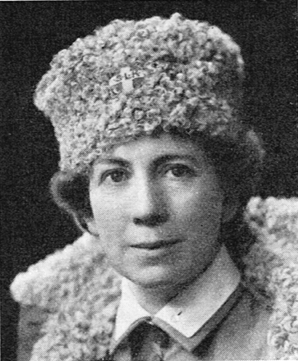

Astrid Rudebeck (1893–1982) was a Swedish court official.

She served as överhovmästarinna (senior lady-in-waiting) at the Swedish Royal Court from 1956 to 1973.

Court offices
Preceded by Louise Rålamb	Överhovmästarinna; 1956–1973	Succeeded by Alice Trolle-Wachtmeister
