= Augusta Lewenhaupt =

20th century Swedish court official

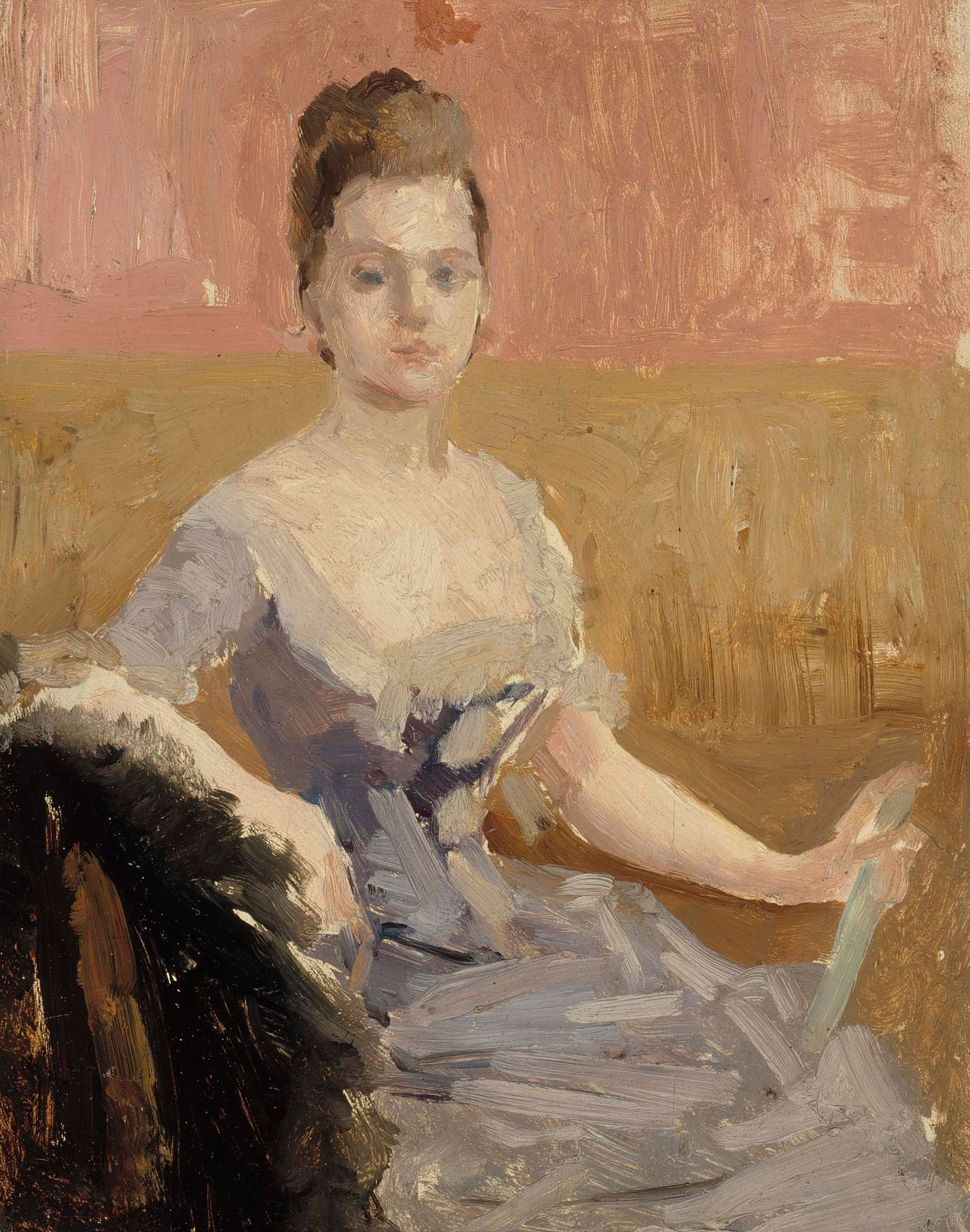
Augusta Lewenhaupt

Augusta Lewenhaupt née Wirsén (1851–1939) was a Swedish court official. She served as överhovmästarinna (senior lady-in-waiting) to the queen of Sweden, Victoria of Baden, from 1908 to 1938.

She was the daughter of major count Carl Emil Wirsén and Ebba Lovisa De Geer af Leufsta. She married Minister for Foreign Affairs count Carl Lewenhaupt in 1874. She accompanied her spouse on his diplomatic posts in London and Paris before he became minister of foreign affairs, and described as talented, witty and entertaining.

In 1908 she was appointed senior lady-in-waiting to the Swedish court. Queen Victoria regarded her as experienced, just, independent and well informed, and their relationship is described as that of mutual respect.

Court offices
Preceded by Ebba Åkerhielm	Överhovmästarinna; 1908–1938	Succeeded by Louise Rålamb
