= Louise of the Netherlands =

Queen of Sweden and Norway from 1859 to 1871

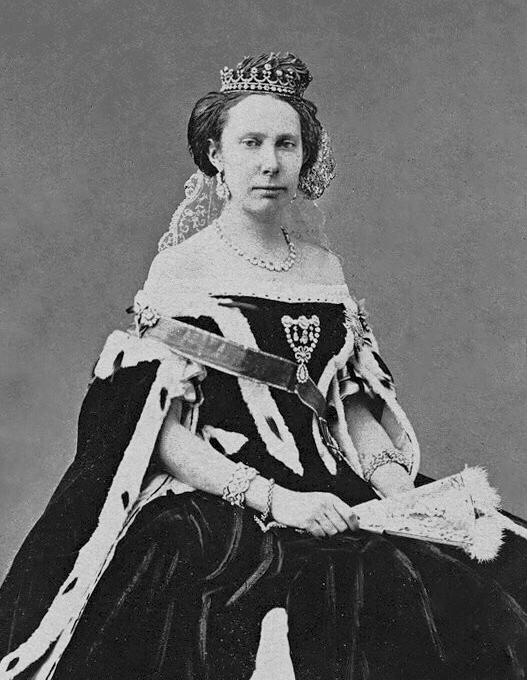

Queen consort of Sweden and Norway
- Tenure: 8 July 1859 – 30 March 1871
- Coronation: 3 May 1860 (Sweden); 5 August 1860 (Norway)
- Born: 5 August 1828; The Hague, United Kingdom of the Netherlands
- Died: 30 March 1871 (aged 42); Stockholm, United Kingdoms of Sweden and Norway
- Burial: Riddarholmen Church
- Spouse: Charles XV & IV (m. 1850)
- Issue: Louise, Queen of Denmark; Prince Carl Oscar, Duke of Södermanland
Names
- Wilhelmina Frederika Alexandrine Anna Louise
- House: Orange-Nassau
- Father: Prince Frederick of the Netherlands
- Mother: Princess Louise of Prussia

Louise of the Netherlands (Wilhelmina Frederika Alexandrine Anna Louise; 5 August 1828 – 30 March 1871), also called Lovisa, was Queen of Sweden and Norway from 8 July 1859 until her death in 1871 as the wife of King Charles XV & IV.

== Youth ==
Princess Louise was born on 5 August 1828 in The Hague. Her father was Prince Frederick of the Netherlands, the second child of King William I of the Netherlands and Wilhelmina of Prussia. Her mother Louise was the eighth child of King Frederick William III of Prussia and Louise of Mecklenburg-Strelitz. Her education was to large extent entrusted to her Belgian governess Victoire Wauthier, and she studied French, German, English, Russian and piano.

In 1849, Louise was selected as a suitable spouse for Crown Prince Charles, the son of King Oscar I of Sweden and Norway and Josephine of Leuchtenberg. The marriage was arranged after the negotiations to arrange a marriage between Charles and her cousin Princess Louise of Prussia had failed. King Oscar I of Sweden wished to secure royal family connections between the new Bernadotte dynasty and the old royal dynasties of Europe, and a Protestant princess was also seen as a necessary queen of the Protestant Sweden-Norway after two Catholic predecessors. Louise fulfilled these credentials, and a great dowry was expected from the rich House of Orange-Nassau. Cabinet secretary L Manderström was sent to inspect her, and diplomatically let it be known in his report that Louise had an excellent education and a good character but that she was not attractive. In August 1849, a meeting was arranged between Louise and Charles in the Hague. Reportedly, Louise fell in love with Charles and felt an immediate attraction, while Charles in contrast was disappointed in her appearance. Charles, however, was convinced to agree to the marriage by the King.

The engagement was officially declared in February 1850. The expectations of her great fortune was debated in Sweden, both in the parliament during the discussions about the allowance, and in the radical press, who suggested that the monarch would now be able to finance the construction of the Swedish rail road net by himself. In reality, however, her dowry turned out to be very small. During the engagement, Louise studied the Swedish language and history; she never learnt Norwegian, however. Because the Dutch government had supported the marriage, she did not have to renounce her rights to the Dutch throne upon her marriage.

== Crown princess ==
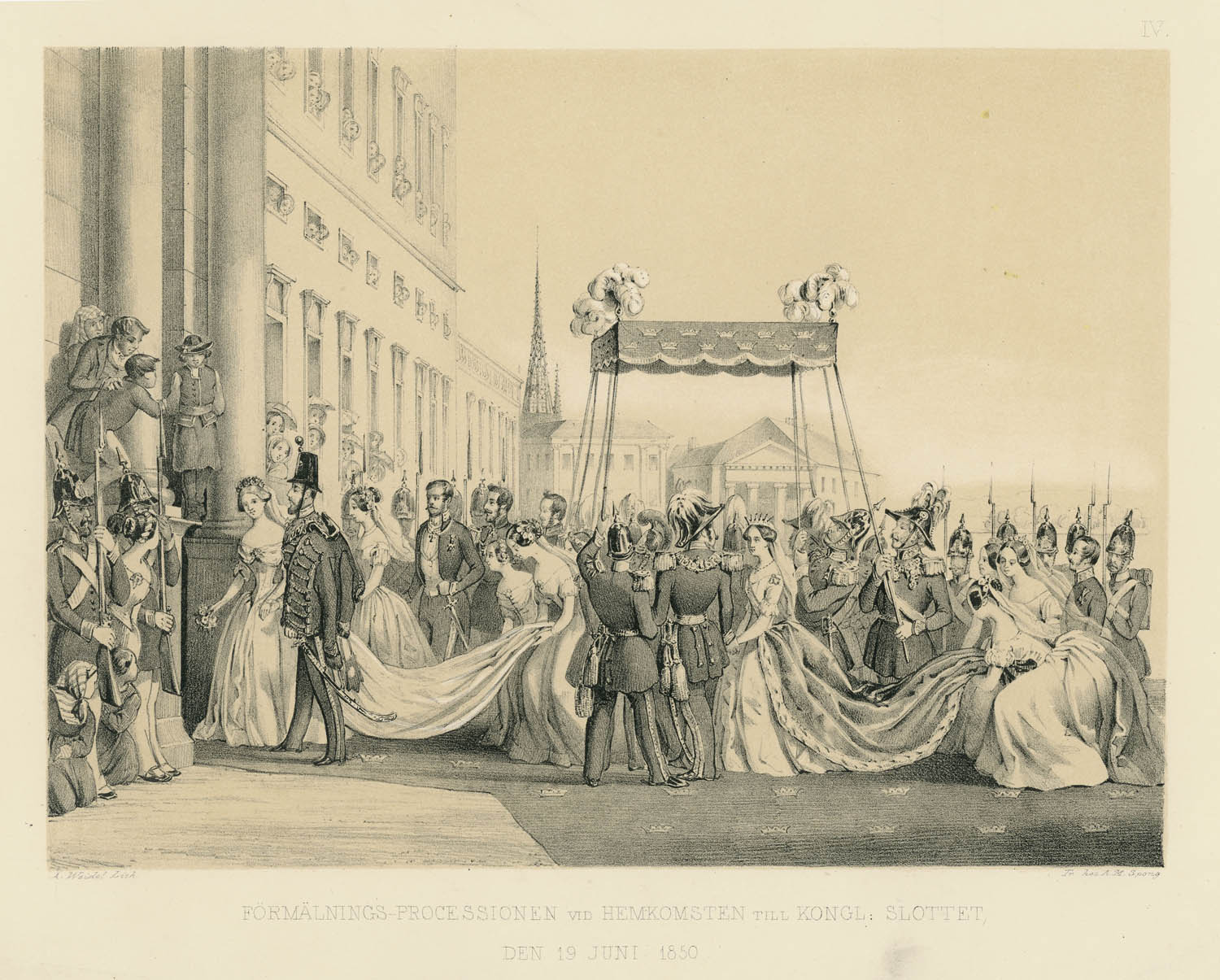
Charles XV and Louise of Orange Nassau betrothal in 1850. Returning home to the castle

Louise left Germany by a Swedish boat from Travemünde and arrived to Sweden with her parents and sister Marie, who were present at her wedding. Princess Louise and Crown Prince Charles married at Storkyrkan in Stockholm on 19 June 1850. She was given Countess Elisabet Piper as her hovmästarinna (senior lady-in-waiting) and Ottiliana Sparre and Ulrika Sprengsporten as maids-of-honor. After the wedding, her father-in-law the King took her on a tour through Sweden to introduce her to the country.

The relationship between Louise and Charles was unhappy. The couple had dissimilar personalities, with Louise being introverted, shy and with a preference for a simple life, and Charles extraverted and with a love for parties and social life. Louise was reportedly unhappily in love with Charles, who found her unattractive and was unfaithful to her, which pained her considerably.

From 1852 until 1860, Charles had a relationship with Josephine Sparre, maid of honor to Louise, which caused a scandal. Sparre was described as so domineering that the Crown Princess and her maid of honor were said to have changed places with each other, with Louise being the lady-in-waiting to Josephine Sparre rather than the other way around. Fritz von Dardel described Sparre: "The lady in question is a great favorite of the Crown Prince as well as with the Crown Princess, and she governs them both entirely in everything about their daily life. Gifted with an unusual talent to please and make herself indispensable, she has managed to capture the Crown Prince to a strange degree."

Louise was given sympathy and Charles was considered to be treating her with neglect. A known episode which attracted attention took place at the birthday garden party of Louise at Drottningholm Palace in 1857, when the Crown Prince proposed a toast to his "secret love" with both Louise and Josephine Sparre present. This caused a scene, and his brother, Prince Oscar, reprimanded him indirectly by asking his own spouse, Sofia of Nassau, to toast with him. This scene caused Louise to burst into tears and suffer a nervous attack.

Louise bore two children; Princess Louise in 1851, and Prince Carl Oscar in 1852. Due to complications that arose at the birth of Prince Carl Oscar, Louise was unable to have any more children. In 1854, her 1-year-old son, Carl Oscar, died. He had fallen ill with measles, but the cold baths he was prescribed caused him to catch pneumonia and he died as a result. As the Salic law prevailed at that time in Sweden (having been introduced by the constitution of 1809), Louise's daughter, princess Louise, was not eligible to ascend the throne. Charles was very chagrined and disappointed because this meant that his progeny would not be the next monarch of Sweden; his heir would be his brother Oscar. Louise offered Charles a divorce so he could remarry and produce a male heir, but he declined the offer.

Crown Princess Louise was not considered a social success, and her timid and shy nature was not appreciated in society because of her official position. Between 1857 and 1859, Crown Prince Charles was named regent during the incapacity of his father, and she took over the representational duties of first lady from her mother-in-law. During her spouse's reign as prince regent, she was described in the well-known court chronicle of Fritz von Dardel:

"A more lovable and talented woman would have entirely recreated the atmosphere in this circle and also exerted a good influence upon the Prince, who, of a good nature, easily let himself be led by those he likes, especially women. Although good, dutiful and not one to plot, the crown princess lacks higher qualities. She is a good housewife but thinks only of her husband, herself and those closest to her and she has not the good influence on him which her good character gives her the right to have. Because of her inborn shyness, she lacks the courage to meddle in his affairs, and her only wish is to gain his love. With one word; she seems not mature enough for her great task".

== Queen ==
Louise's coat of arms as queen of Sweden and Norway

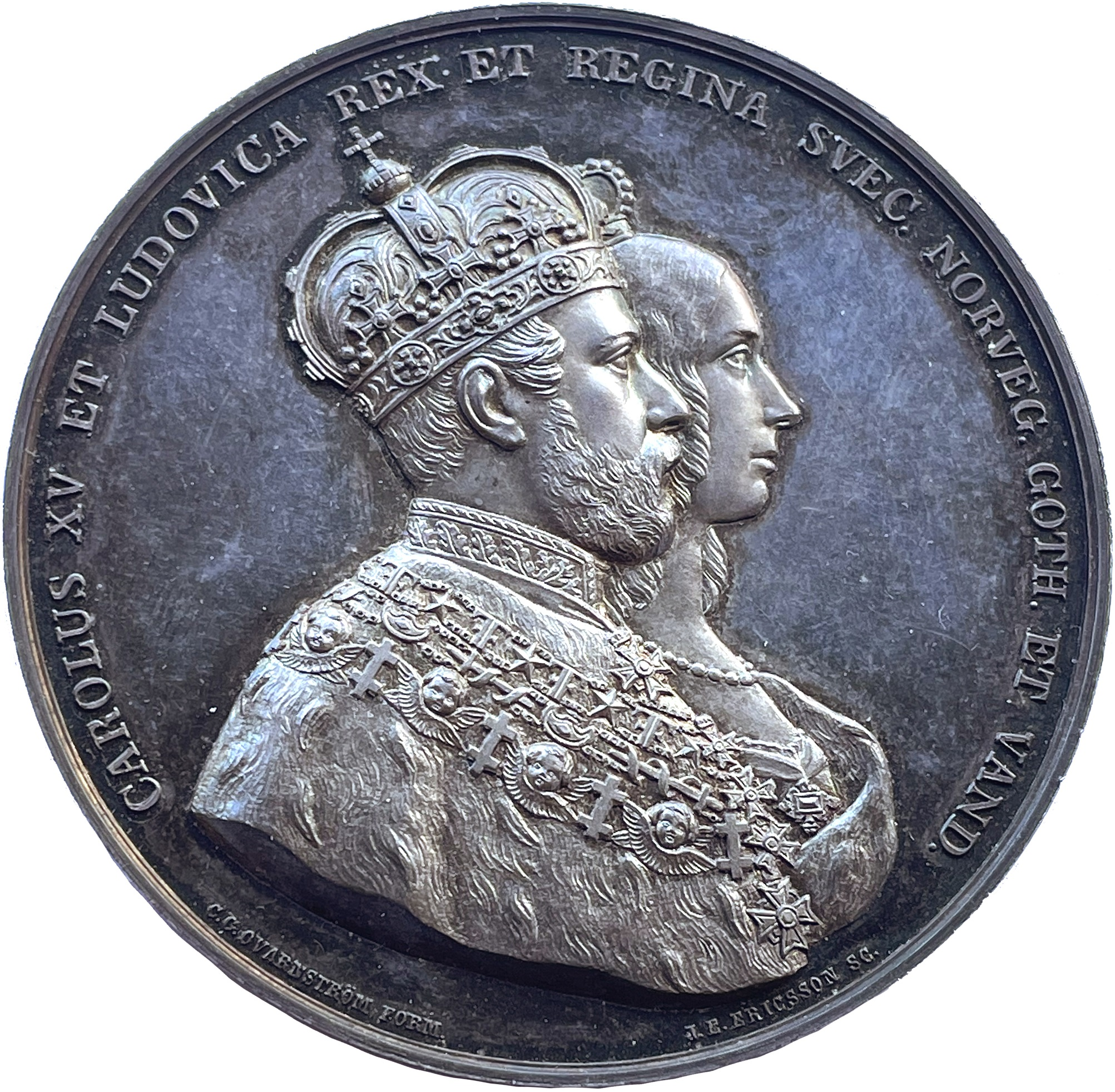
Coronation medal for Louise and Charles 1860

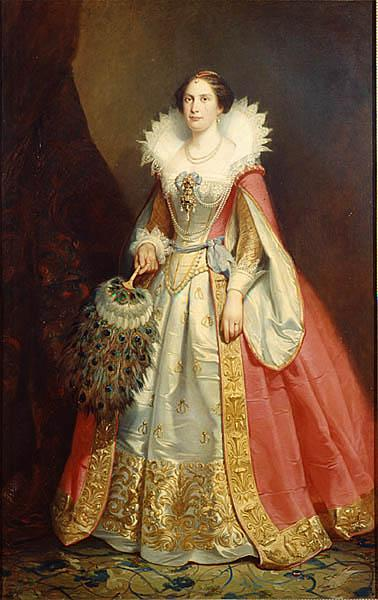
Louise of the Netherlands

Louise became Queen of Sweden and Norway at the death of her father-in-law on 8 July 1859. She was the first queen of the union of Sweden-Norway to be crowned in both Sweden and Norway, as Norway had refused to crown her two predecessors because they were Catholics. Louise was crowned Queen of Sweden in Stockholm on 3 May 1860 and Queen of Norway in Trondheim on 5 August 1860. She was the first queen to be crowned in Norway since the Middle Ages. Louise was very celebrated in Norway during her stay there.

Louise exerted no influence upon state affairs whatsoever, nor did she show any ambition to do so. The fact that she did not meddle in politics was seen as a good role model and was favorably compared to previous queens who had, such as her predecessor, Queen Josephine, and this view is described in a contemporary encyclopedia from 1864: "At last, the two kingdoms can rejoice in the blessing of again having a Queen, who does not proceed the governmental power with her own thoughts, but calmly observes the natural process through King and legitimate authority. Loved by the Swedish people, she has enough opportunity for her noble wish to occupy herself in charity". She did not lack political views, however: she disliked the parliamentary reform of 1865, and she did not share the anti-German view of Charles.

Louise preferred to use her royal position for philanthropy, which was also expected of a female member of the royalty and upper class. She founded the charity organisations: "Kronprinsessan Lovisas vårdanstalt för sjuka barn" (The Crown Princess Louise's Asylum for Sick Children) in 1854; "Femöreföreningen till inrättande av barnhem i Lappland" (The Five Öre Foundation for Orphanages in Lappland) in 1864; "Lotten Wennbergs fond för hjälpbehövande" (The Lotten Wennberg Foundation for the Needing) in 1864; "Drottning Lovisas understödsförening" (The Queen Louise Charity Foundation) in 1866; "Allmänna institutet för dövstumma och blinda" (The Public Institution of the Deaf and Blind); "Sällskapet för inrättande av småbarnsskolor" (The Society for Elementary Education School's Foundation); "Den fosterländska föreningen till uppmuntran av själverksamhet för framtida oberoende" (The Patriotic Society for the Encouragement of Self Employments for Future Independence); and the "Tysta skolan, eller uppfostrings- och undervisningsanstalten för dövstumma barn" (Silent School, or The Nursing- and Education Institution for Deaf and Mute Children) by Johanna Berglind.

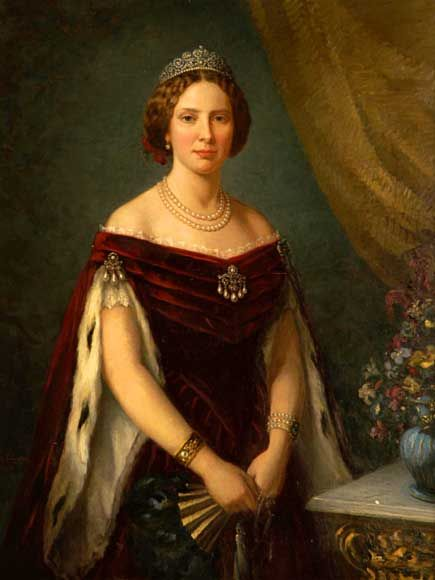
Queen Louise of Sweden and Norway, 1860s

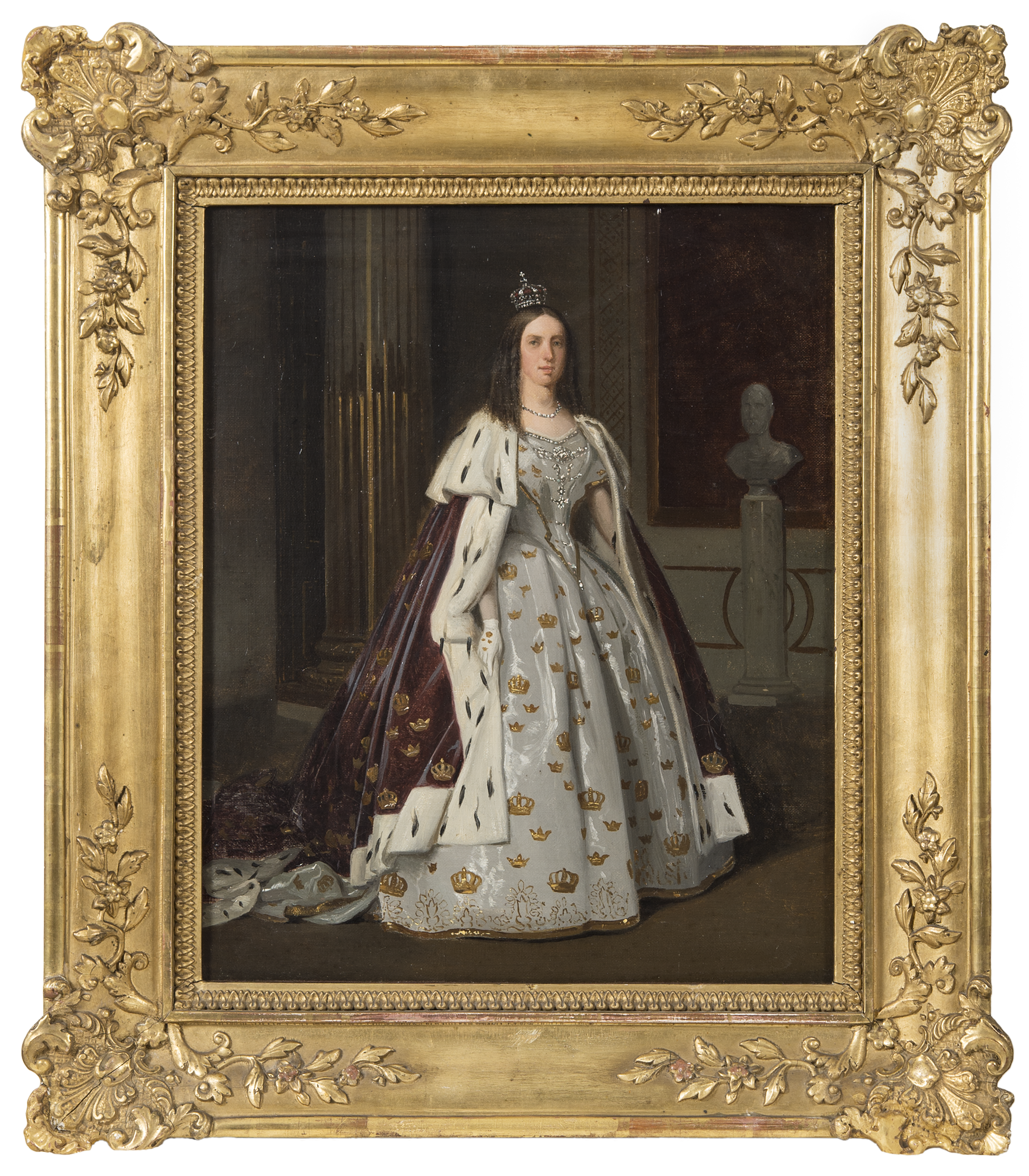
Louise in the only known modern-day painting of a Swedish queen wearing her crown

Louise was interested in music and history, and took piano lessons from the Swedish pianist Adolf Fredrik Lindblad. She translated work from English and Dutch into Swedish, which she sold for charitable purposes. Louise and her daughter were students of Nancy Edberg, the pioneer of swimming for women: swimming was initially not regarded as being entirely proper for ladies, but when the Queen and her daughter Princess Louise supported it by attending the lessons from 1862, swimming quickly became fashionable and accepted for women. Louise employed Sweden's first female dentist, Rosalie Fougelberg, as her official personal dentist in 1867. Among her own personal friends was Aurore von Haxthausen, who was her maid of honor her entire time as queen, as well as Countess Stefanie Hamilton, who served as her Mistress of the Robes in 1859–60: the correspondence of Louise and Stefanie Hamilton is preserved. She also kept in contact with her family and her old governess by correspondence.

Queen Louise preferred a quiet and anonymous family life and preferred to avoid ceremonial and representational duties whenever she could, some times by pretending to be ill. King Charles, however, did not like to appear without her at formal occasions and occasionally forced her to be present. On one occasion, he is known to have said to her that she would have to attend, otherwise: "The old women might think there is something wrong with you!" In 1866, for example, Charles made her open the General Industrial Exposition of Stockholm (1866) in his place.

King Charles XV loved parties and masquerades, and his court life at Ulriksdal Palace was compared to that at Versailles and was in some circles considered to shame the name of the monarchy, expressed by the vicar Christoffer Bruun in 1881: "It still causes as shiver that the highest power of the church was placed in the hands of this degenerated King, who has filled the whole nation with talk of his debauched life." Louise was given an important part to play in his court life as the Queen, and upon the death of Queen Dowager Desirée, who had occupied the Queen's wing in the Stockholm Royal Palace until her death in 1860, Charles redecorated it for Louise and had a luxurious Venetian Mirror hall made to her reception room, which was much talked about (it was later removed by his successor). Her court was headed by Wilhelmina Bonde almost her entire tenure as queen. Reportedly, Louise suffered from her spouse's adultery and did her best to compete with her rivals and entertain him, and her mother-in-law advised her to remove and marry away her maids of honor when Charles became attracted to them. Charles had a relationship with Hanna Styrell from 1860 until 1869 and with Wilhelmine Schröder from 1869 until his death, except from his more temporary relationships. Charles was very fond of their daughter; however, Louise was worried that he treated their daughter too much like a son at a time when gender roles were considered extremely important, allowing her more freedom than what was considered to be suitable for a girl at that time.

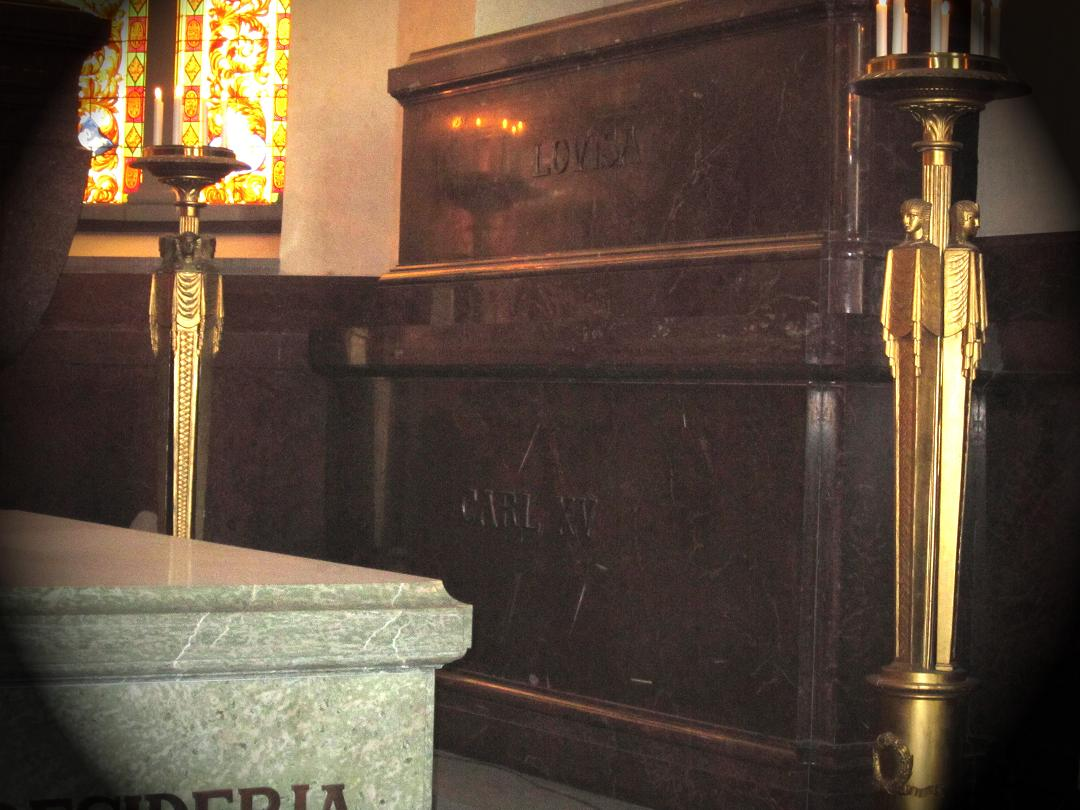
Grave of King Carl and Queen Louise in Riddarholm Church.

Louise suffered from bad health. On at least one occasion, during a boat trip on Mälaren, she suffered some kind of a fit (possibly an epileptic seizure from contemporary descriptions), which was interpreted to have been a hysterical reaction to her husband's neglect. The court gathered to conceal her from public view, and the King quickly took her below deck. In this issue, it is reported that: "Lovisa could at any time faint and in connection to this, she could have what is called nerve- or cramp-attacks". In 1864, during a visit to court by a former lover of Charles, Josephine Sparre, Fritz von Dardel noted: "Initially the Queen is said to have felt worried for this visit; one evening, Her Majesty was about to have convulsions in the billiard hall, but this they attempted to conceal by claiming that it was caused by her chamberlain Liljenkrantz, who was supposed to have pushed her accidentally with his billiard pole..."

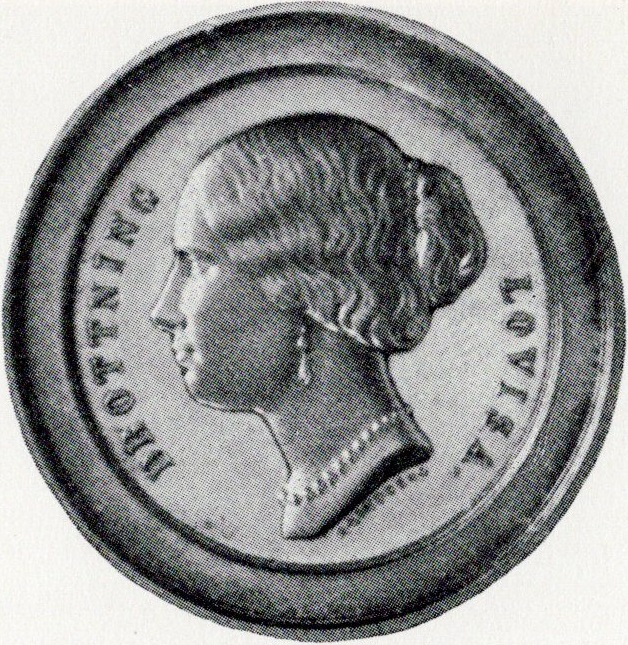
Memorial relief for Queen Louise in 1872

In 1870, Queen Louise visited the Netherlands to be present at the death bed of her mother. Upon her return to Stockholm, Charles XV fell sick and she nursed him. Exhausted, she contracted pneumonia during a walk by carriage. On her death bed, she had long conversations with her family, which have been described as dramatic. Her daughter claimed: "It was as if mother exposed her entire life to us". Louise asked Charles to forgive her everything in which she could have failed him, to which he responded by accusing himself, after which both he and his mother Josephine reportedly fainted because they were so moved. Louise died on 30 March 1871, aged 42.

== Issue ==
Louisa and Charles had two children together:

1. Princess Louise (31 October 1851 – 20 March 1926), later Queen of Denmark
2. Prince Carl Oscar, Duke of Södermanland (14 December 1852 – 13 March 1854), who died in infancy

No subsequent king of Sweden to this day is Louise’s descendant. However, through her daughter, her descendants are on the thrones of Denmark, Luxembourg, Belgium and Norway.

== Ancestry ==
Ancestors of Louise of the Netherlands

8. William V, Prince of Orange
4. William I of the Netherlands
9. Princess Wilhelmina of Prussia
2. Prince Frederick of the Netherlands
10. Frederick William II of Prussia (=12)
5. Princess Wilhemine of Prussia
11. Princess Frederika Louisa of Hesse-Darmstadt (=13)
1. Princess Louise of the Netherlands
12. Frederick William II of Prussia (=10)
6. Frederick William III of Prussia
13. Princess Frederika Louisa of Hesse-Darmstadt (=11)
3. Princess Louise of Prussia
14. Charles II, Grand Duke of Mecklenburg-Strelitz
7. Duchess Louise of Mecklenburg-Strelitz
15. Princess Friederike of Hesse-Darmstadt

== Notes and references ==
- Svenskt biografiskt handlexikon (1906), Lovisa.
- Nationalencyklopedin, Lovisa
- Christer Engstrand and Ingmar Andersson. Historiska Personer: Lovisa av Nederländerna. Retrieved 3 October 2004.
- Lars Elgklou (1995). Familjen Bernadotte, en kunglig släktkrönika (in Swedish). Skogs boktryckeri Trelleborg. ISBN 91-7054-755-6.
- Lars O. Lagerqvist (1979). Bernadotternas drottningar (in Swedish). Albert Bonniers Förlag AB. ISBN 91-0-042916-3.
- Lars Elgklou (1978). Bernadotte. Historien – eller historier – om en familj.. Stockholm: Askild & Kärnekull Förlag AB.
- http://www.historici.nl/Onderzoek/Projecten/DVN/lemmata/data/LouisevanOranjeNassau

Louise of the Netherlands House of Orange-Nassau Cadet branch of the House of Nassau Born: 5 August 1828 Died: 30 March 1871
Royal titles
Preceded by Josephine of Leuchtenberg	Queen consort of Sweden and Norway; 1859–1871	Vacant Title next held by Sophia of Nassau
