= Statsfru =

Office at the Royal Court of Sweden

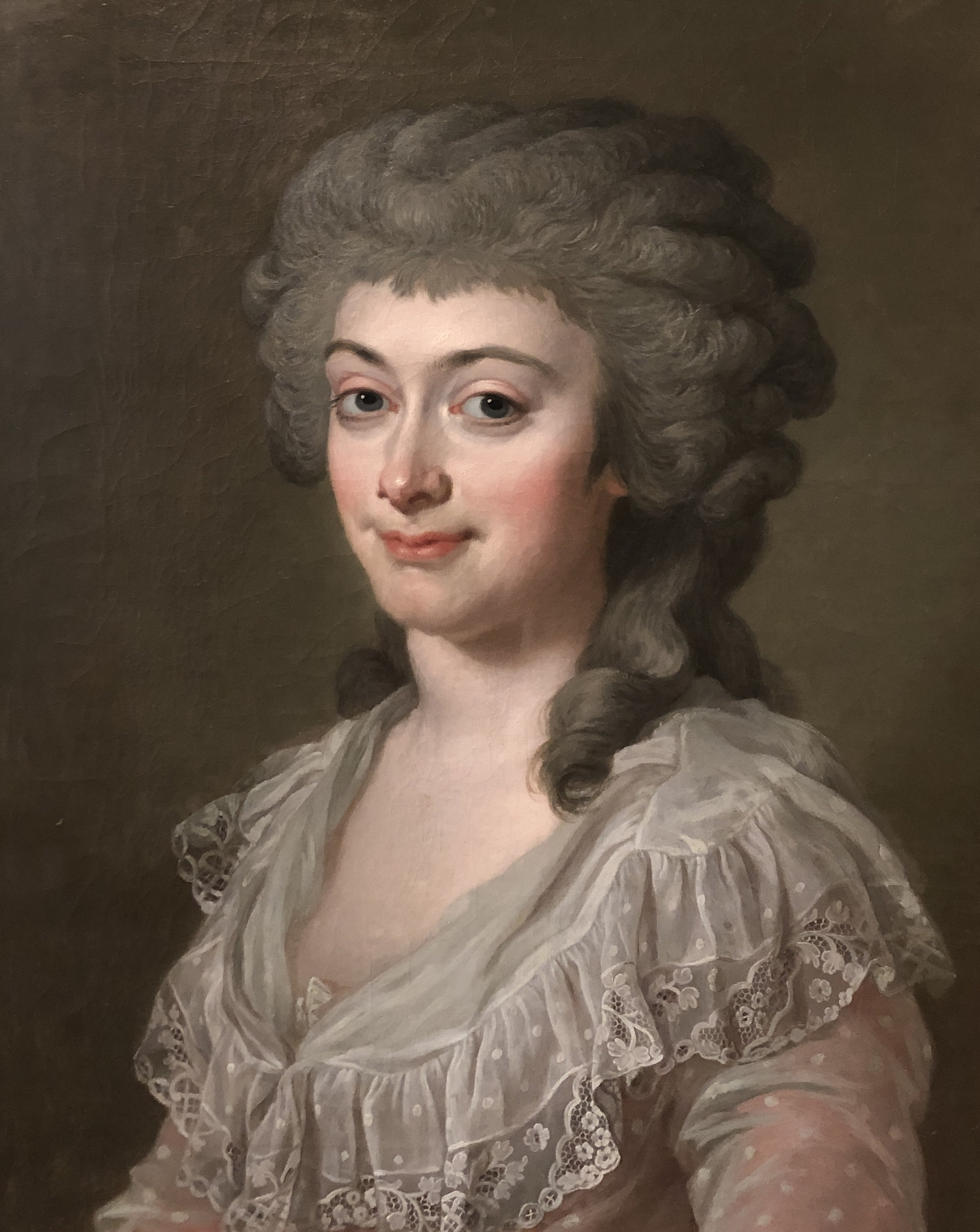
Hedvig Eleonora Klinckowström, by Lorens Pasch the Younger, Göteborgs konstmuseum. She was one of the first six women appointed statsfru when the post was first created in 1774.

Statsfru ("Lady of the State") is an office at the Royal Court of Sweden. The title has been used for two different offices during the course of history. Originally created in 1774, the office was simply the title of a married lady-in-waiting in rank between the överhovmästarinna and the kammarfröken, and shared between several individuals. This function disappeared after 1965. From 1994 onward, the title Statsfru has been used by the senior lady-in-waiting of the queen, and became a managerial title held by only one person at the time.

== Historical function ==
Originally, the Swedish Royal Household had no married ladies-in-waiting. The ladies-in-waiting, collectively referred to as Hovfruntimret, consisted of unmarried noblewomen with the title Hovfröken (maid of honour) one of whom could be promoted to a Kammarfröken (Senior maid of honour). They were supervised by the Överhovmästarinna, who was a widowed noblewoman, and the Kammarfröken was her deputy. Married noblewomen attended court informally, by being married to husbands who had offices at court, but a married noblewoman could not have her own office at court.

In 1774, king Gustav III introduced a new office called statsfru, to make it possible for married women to have a formal position at court. The new category of ladies-in-waiting, the Statsfru, were ranked below the widowed Överhovmästarinna but above the unmarried Kammarfröken and Hovfröken. While the Överhovmästarinna had the rank of Excellency and the Hovfröken had the rank of Colonel, the Statsfru had the rank of a General and were to be treated in accordance with this rank in public.

The Statsfru were to be married noblewomen. Both the queen and the queen dowager had statsfru. There were always several statsfru, who alternated in served the queen in pairs of two: in 1774, there were six Statsfru, and in 1917, there were eight. Their function was essentially the same as the Hovfröken: they performed secretarial duties, answered letters, made purchases, acted as messengers, delivered orders, performed smaller representational duties such as attending weddings and funerals in the nobility as in place of the queen, and accompanied the queen as her company and entourage.

However, the Statsfru had more privileges than the unmarried Hovfröken and the widowed Överhovmästarinna. Because they were married and expected to be able to attend their families, they were permitted to make their own terms, could negotiate their salary and refuse assignments. Like the Hovfröken, they had their own room at the royal palace, personal servants and free use of a carriage from the royal stables; but in contrast to the Hovfröken, they were also permitted to visit the private rooms of the queen without permission of the Överhovmästarinna, and they took their orders directly from the queen and not from the Överhovmästarinna. They could also act as the deputy of the Överhovmästarinna when she was absent from court.

They wore a black uniform with a blue ribbon over their chest with the queen's initials in the form of jewelry.

All queens and queen dowagers since between 1774 and 1965 had Statsfru with the exception of Josephine of Leuchtenberg.

== Modern function ==
The function of statsfru was transformed in the late 20th-century from a function divided on several people, to become the title for only one person, the senior lady-in-waiting of the queen.

When queen Louise Mountbatten died in 1965, her senior lady-in-waiting, the överhovmästarinna Astrid Rudebeck, remained at the royal household in service of king Gustaf VI Adolf, acting as his deputy hostess in the absence of a queen. When Alice Trolle-Wachtmeister was appointed to be the senior lady-in-waiting of the next queen in 1978, she was given the title Statsfru, instead of the traditional title of Överhovmästarinna.

== See also ==
- Dame du Palais, French equivalent
- Lady of the Bedchamber, English equivalent
