= Rebolledo =

Surname

Rebolledo is a surname. Notable people with the surname include:

- Luis Rebolledo de Palafox y Melci, 1st marqués de Lazán (1772–1843), Aragonese officer and general during the Spanish War of Independence
- Bernardino de Rebolledo (1597–1676), Spanish poet, soldier and diplomat
- Diego de Rebolledo (in office 1654–1659), colonial governor of Spanish Florida
- Efrén Rebolledo (1877–1929), Mexican poet and diplomat
- Ernesto Martens Rebolledo (1933–2024), Mexican chemical engineer, Secretary of Energy during Vicente Fox's government
- Jonathan Rebolledo (born 1991), Chilean footballer
- Juan Williams Rebolledo (1825–1910), Chilean rear admiral, commander-in-chief of the Chilean navy at the start of the War of the Pacific
- Julián Rebolledo, American actor and voice talent, known for playing Jake Morgendorffer on the MTV animated series Daria
- Manuel Preciado Rebolledo (1957–2012), Spanish football defender and coach
- Nelson Rebolledo (born 1985), Chilean football midfielder or defender
- Pedro Rebolledo (born 1960), former professional tennis player from Chile
- Pedro Rebolledo (composer) (1895–1963), Panamanian composer and sometime trumpeter
- José Rebolledo de Palafox, 1st Duke of Saragossa (1780–1847), Spanish general who fought in the Peninsular War
- Daniel Rebolledo Sepúlveda (1848–1908), Chilean military officer

== See also ==
- Rebolledo de la Torre, municipality located in the province of Burgos, Castile and León, Spain
- Rebola (disambiguation)
- Rebollo
- Robledo (disambiguation)
