= Anna de Beaumont =

Spanish-Navarrese Noblewoman

- Arms of the House of Beaumont.
- Born: ca. 1430
- Died: 1518 (aged 87–88); Valladolid
- House: House of Beaumont
- Father: Louis I de Beaumont
- Mother: Juana de Navarre (daughter of Charles III of Navarre)
- Occupation: Governess of the Imperial Children at Mechelen.

Doña Anna de Beaumont y Navarre (Dutch: Anne van Beaumont; ca. 1430 – 1518) was a Spanish-Navarrese noblewoman and lady-in-waiting who served in the household of Joanna of Castile, in the early 16th century. She accompanied Joanna to the Low Countries in 1496 and remained among the core of her Spanish attendants.

From 1499, Anna de Beaumont served as governess (aya) and later grand mistress in the household of the Habsburg children at the Hof van Savoye ('Court of Savoy') in Mechelen, under the supervision of their aunt Margaret of Austria, governor of the Habsburg Netherlands. In this capacity she functioned as a dueña, that is, a senior noblewoman entrusted with the supervision, guardianship, and moral oversight of younger royals and noblewomen. She was responsible for the care and upbringing of Eleanor of Austria, and later also of Isabella, Mary, and Archduke Charles, the future emperor Charles V.

== Biography ==
Anna de Beaumont was born into Navarre royalty between 1425 and 1456, perhaps in ca. 1430 at Lerín. She was the daughter of Louis I de Beaumont, Count of Lerín and his wife Juana (Joan) de Navarre, illegitimate daughter of Charles III of Navarre. Anna was thus a distant relative of Joanna of Castile. She was named after her paternal grandmother, Anna de Curton, Lady of Guiche.. She was sister of the famous constable of Navarre and head of the Spanish faction (the 'Beaumont faction') in the Kingdom of Navarre, Louis II de Beaumont, 2nd Count of Lerín.

She was a member of the House of Beaumont, which ruled as counts of Lerín in southern Navarre. The Beaumont dynasty was a scion of the House of Évreux, itself a cadet branch of the Capetian dynasty, the royal house of France, and descended from Louis of Évreux, Duke of Durazzo, the youngest son of Philip III of Navarre and Joan II of Navarre, through his illegitimate son Carlos de Beaumont.

=== Lady-in-waiting to Joanna the Mad ===
She was among the twelve noble ladies appointed by Isabella I of Castile, to serve as ladies-in-waiting to her daughter Joanna "the Mad" of Castile. Her husband, Philip I of Castile, considered it essential to grant gifts and pensions to Anne de Beaumont and fourteen other noblewomen who served the archduchess.

Several authors, including Bethany Aram and Nuria Silleras-Fernandez highlight that Anna de Beaumont, played a role in the intricate court dynamics under Joanna the Mad, where various individuals, especially her husband, sought to secure the control and loyalty of Joanna's courtiers through the granting of gifts, pensions, and other incentives.

In August 1496, Anna set sail from Laredo and travelled to Flanders in the retinue of Infanta Joanna. In late 1496, Joana bid farewell to the majority of those who had accompanied her to the Low Countries. However, Anna, described as being part of the "hard core of Spanish staff", remained. She was described as a dueña, a term for an older unmarried woman or widow who as guardian looks after a younger woman.

=== Grand Mistress of the imperial children ===
Anna de Beaumont played a pivotal role in the education and upbringing of Archduke Charles and his sisters, demonstrating a meticulous and tender approach that left a lasting impression on their lives, garnering enduring gratitude. She firstly became governess and lady-in-waiting to Eleanor of Austria in 1499, and after the birth of Isabella in 1501 and Mary in 1505, she also oversaw their upbringing and education. Anna reported to Margaret, their guardian, in Spanish, but apparently she did not teach the language to the children. Margaret in turn reported to Emperor Maximilian.

As Grand Mistress of the Imperial Household, Anna was in charge of the ladies' bedroom (French: Chambre des dames), consisting of over seven maids of honour, and was under the authority of the head of the household of the imperial children, First Chamberlain Charles de Croÿ-Chimay, and later his cousin William de Croÿ.

Her monthly remuneration amounted to 37 livres, as recorded in an inventory of the imperial finances and court in Mechelen in December 1508.

Ferdinand II, the old King of Aragon, honoured Anna de Beaumont with the Order of S. Iago. In 1514, Margaret petitioned the Emperor to permit Anna, who was burdened by the frailties of old age, to retire to one of the Archduke's residences in Ghent and to receive her accustomed pension and a "good annual sum of money". This plea emphasized Anna's extensive and commendable service to "Mesdames mes nieces," coupled with the perceived inadequacy of compensation for her dedicated efforts. Despite the request, Anna continued in her position. A fellow lady-in-waiting, Marie de Croix, the widow of Charles de Latre, who had served as butler to the princes until his death in 1510, was appointed to assist Anna in her duties.

She served as Grand Mistress at the Hof van Savoye in Mechelen, Antwerp, for eighteen years, until the marriage of Eleanor of Austria and Manuel I of Portugal, where Anna accompanied the archduchess to Spain, in 1517. Here she obtained her retirement and was rewarded a pension of 1500 ducats by Charles V, "so that she might withdraw to her home".

She died shortly afterwards in 1518 in Valladolid.

== Family and misidentification ==
In his genealogy of the Beaumont-Navarre family from 1909, Basque historian Jean de Jaurgain, states that Anna de Beaumont died "unmarried". Some documents attest her heir as Francés de Beaumont, her fraternal nephew.

Anna de Beaumont had at least two namesake nieces, with whom she is sometimes misidentified. One of these, Anna de Beaumont, daughter of Louis II de Beaumont, 2nd Count of Lerín, married Juan de Mendoza. Her brother, Juan de Beaumont, also had a daughter named Ana de Beaumont, who married Luiz de Peralta, 3rd Lord of Valtierra (Spanish: Señor de Valtierra), son of Martin de Peralta, Lord of Valtierra and Leonor de Rebolledo.
