= Christian II of Denmark =

King of Denmark and Norway from 1513 to 1523

Christian II
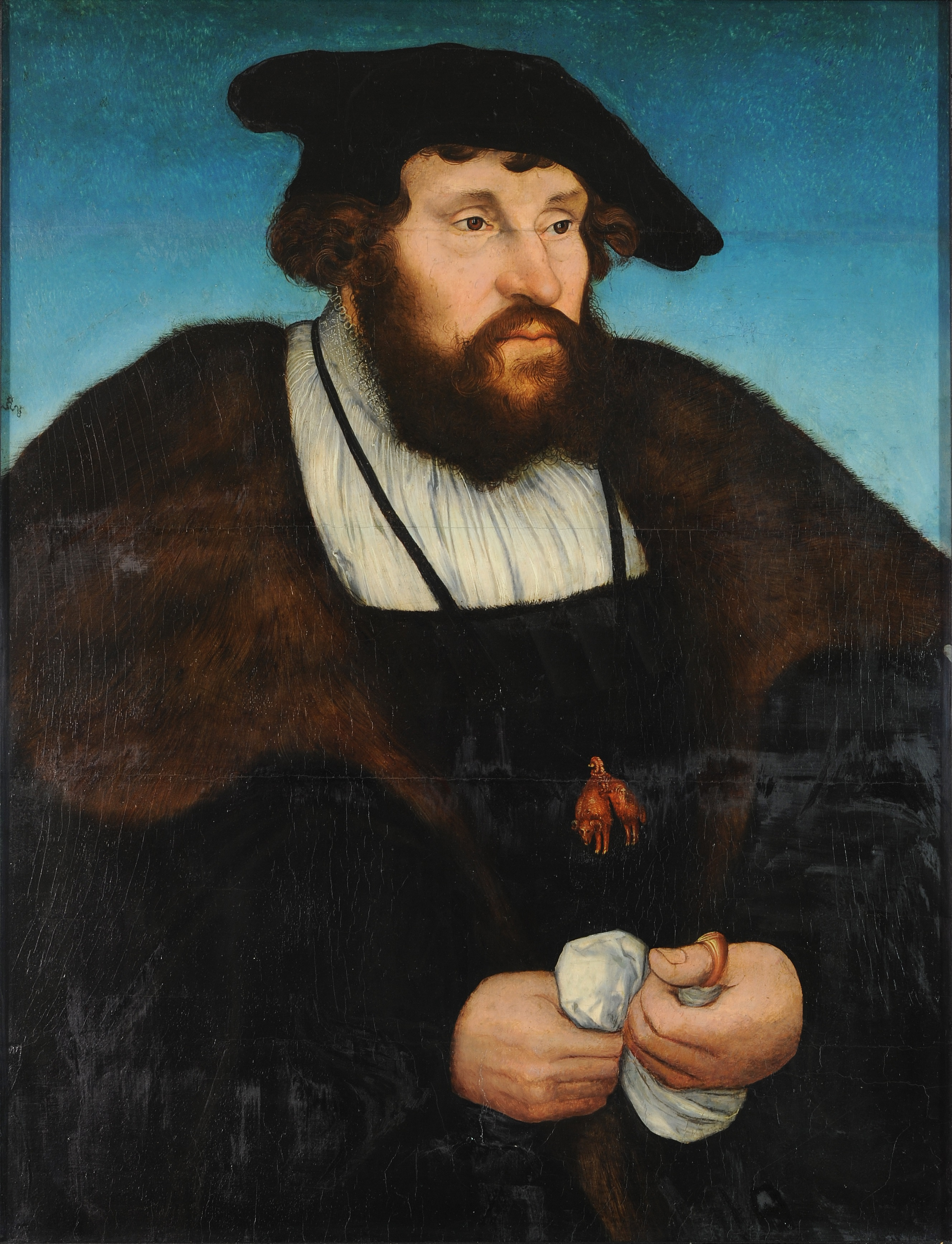
- Portrait by Lucas Cranach the Elder, c. 1523

King of Denmark and Norway
- Reign: 22 July 1513 – 20 January 1523
- Coronation: 11 June 1514, Copenhagen; 23 July 1514, Oslo
- Predecessor: John
- Successor: Frederick I

Viceroy of Norway
- Reign: 1506 - 20 January 1513
- Monarch: John

King of Sweden
- Reign: 1 November 1520 – 23 August 1521
- Coronation: 4 November 1520; Storkyrkan, Stockholm
- Predecessor: John II
- Successor: Gustav I
- Born: 1 July 1481; Nyborg Castle, Nyborg, Denmark
- Died: 25 January 1559 (aged 77); Kalundborg Castle, Kalundborg, Denmark
- Burial: St. Peter's Abbey, Ghent (1559–1883); St. Canute's Cathedral, Odense (since 1883)
- Spouse: Isabella of Austria (m. 1514; died 1526)
- Issue more...: John of Denmark; Dorothea, Electress Palatine; Christina, Duchess of Milan
- House: Oldenburg
- Father: John, King of Denmark
- Mother: Christina of Saxony
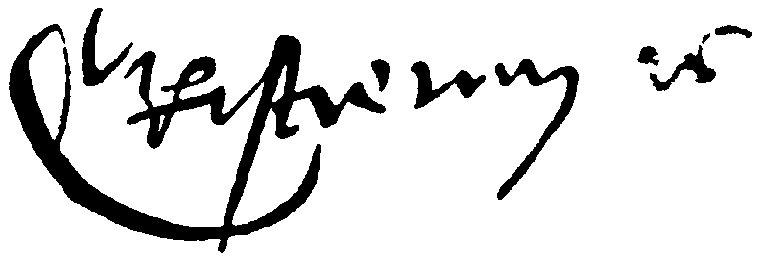
- Signature

Christian II (1 July 1481 – 25 January 1559), also known as Christian the Tyrant, was a monarch under the Kalmar Union, reigning as King of Denmark and Norway from 1513 until 1523. He was briefly King of Sweden from 1520 until 1521. As king of Denmark, he was concurrently Duke of Schleswig and Holstein in joint rule with his uncle Frederick.

As king, Christian tried to maintain the Kalmar Union between the Scandinavian countries, which brought him to war with Sweden, lasting between 1518 and 1523. Though he captured the country in 1520, the subsequent slaughter of leading Swedish nobility, churchmen, and others, known as the Stockholm Bloodbath, caused the Swedes to rise against his rule. He was deposed in a rebellion led by the nobleman and later king of Sweden, Gustav Vasa. He attempted to bring in a radical reform of the Danish state in 1521–22, which would have strengthened the rights of commoners at the expense of the nobles and clergy. The nobility rose against him in 1523, and he was exiled to the Netherlands, ceding the Danish throne to his uncle Frederick. After attempting to reclaim the thrones in 1531, he was arrested and held in captivity for the rest of his life, first in Sønderborg Castle and later at Kalundborg Castle. Supporters tried to restore him to power both during his exile and his imprisonment but they were defeated decisively during the Count's Feud in 1536. Christian died at Kalundborg in 1559.

In 1515, Christian married Isabella of Austria, granddaughter of Maximilian I, Holy Roman Emperor. Isabella died in 1526, after which her family took Christian's three children from him. His relationship with his mistress, Dyveke Sigbritsdatter, pre-dated his marriage and continued until her death in 1517. Christian's persecution of her supposed murderer contributed to his political isolation and downfall. Dyveke's mother, Sigbrit Willoms, became an influential councillor and followed Christian into exile.

== Early life ==
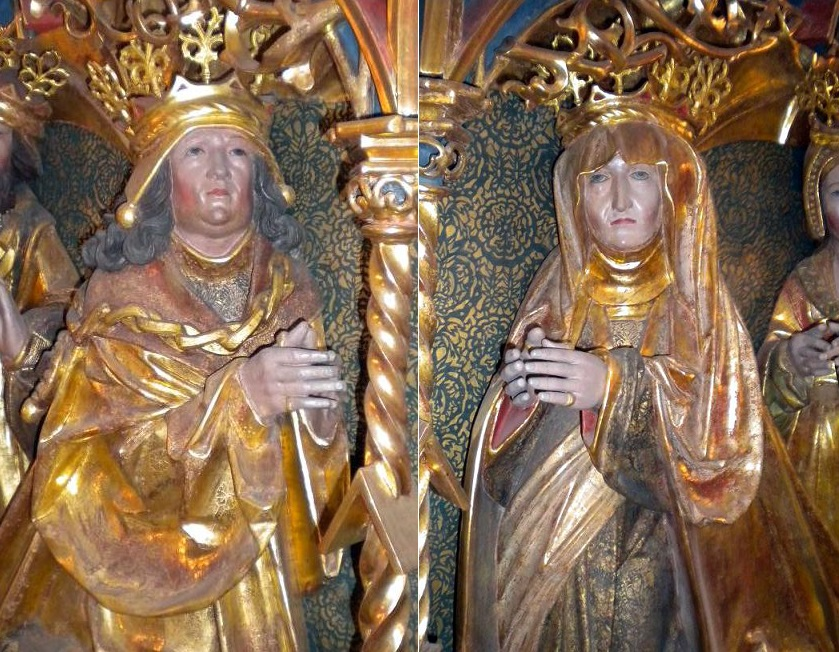
Christian's parents, King John and Queen Christina

Christian was born at Nyborg Castle in 1481 as the son of John, King of Denmark and his wife, Christina of Saxony. Christian descended, through Valdemar I of Sweden, from the House of Eric, and from Catherine, daughter of Inge I of Sweden, as well as from Ingrid Ylva, granddaughter of Sverker I of Sweden. His rival Gustav I of Sweden descended only from Sverker II of Sweden and the House of Sverker.

Christian took part in his father's conquest of Sweden in 1497 and in the Dano-Swedish War (1501–1512). He was appointed viceroy of Norway in 1506, and succeeded in maintaining control of the country. During his administration in Norway, he attempted to deprive the Norwegian nobility of its traditional influence exercised through the Rigsraadet privy council, leading to controversy with the latter.

In 1513, he succeeded his father as king of Denmark and Norway. Christian's succession to the thrones of Norway and Denmark was confirmed at the Herredag assembly of notables from the three northern kingdoms, which met at Copenhagen in 1513. The Swedish delegates said, "We have the choice between peace at home and strife here, or peace here and civil war at home, and we prefer the former." A decision as to the Swedish succession was therefore postponed. Christian's coronations as king of Denmark in Copenhagen and of Norway in Oslo took place in the summer of 1514.

== Personal life ==
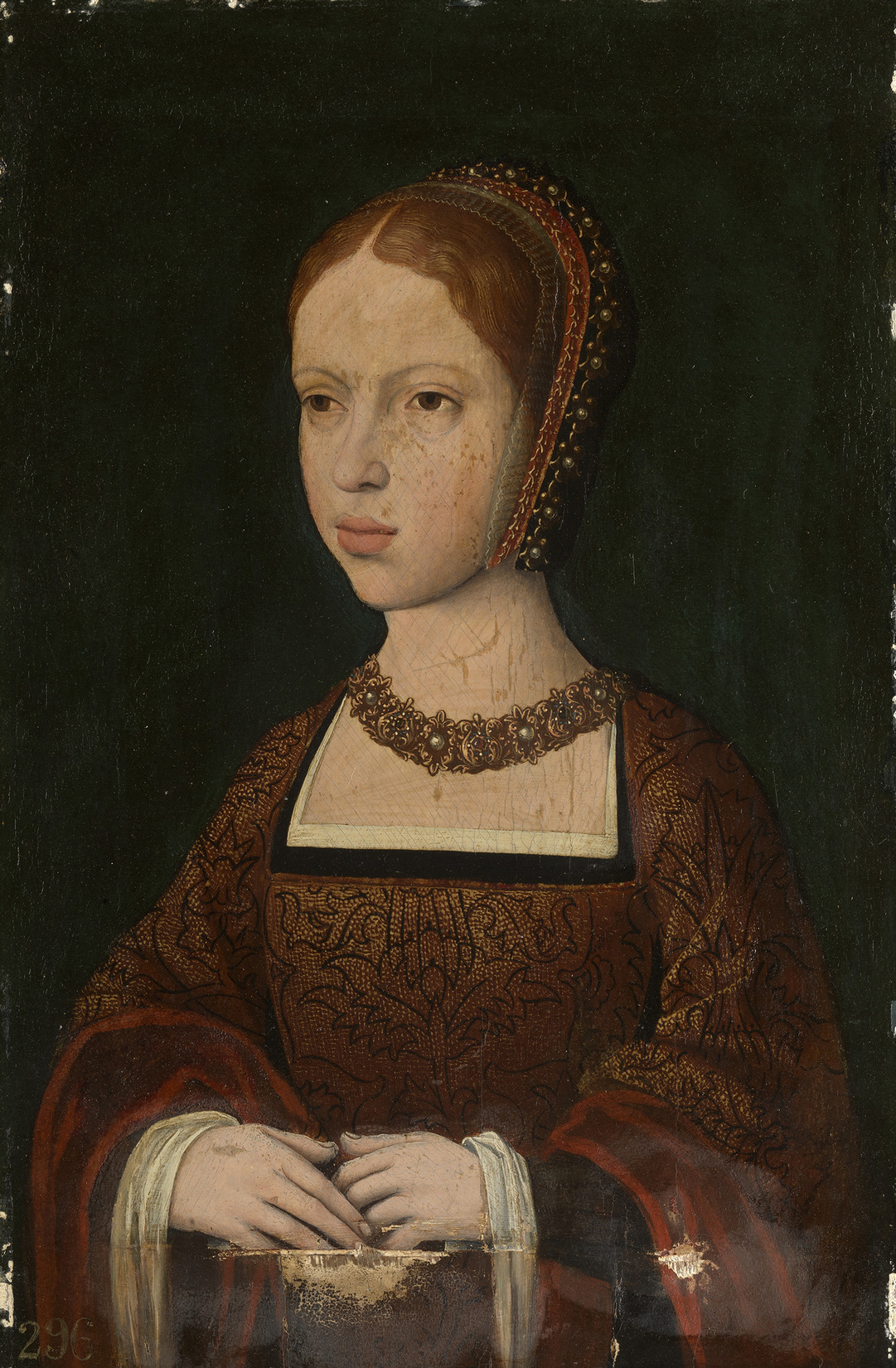
Isabella of Austria, Christian's wife.

Whilst visiting Bergen in 1507 or 1509, Christian fell in love with a Norwegian girl of Dutch heritage, named Dyveke Sigbritsdatter. She became his mistress and remained with him until Dyveke's death. Their relationship was not interrupted by Christian's marriage to Isabella of Austria, the granddaughter of Holy Roman Emperor Maximilian I. They married by proxy on 11 June 1514 in Brussels. Isabella was brought to Copenhagen a year later, and the marriage was ratified on 12 August 1515 at Copenhagen Castle, in a ceremony conducted by Birger Gunnersen, Archbishop of Lund.

Dyveke died in 1517, and Christian was led to believe that the magnate Torben Oxe had poisoned her. Oxe's status meant that he should have been tried by the Council of State, but instead he was brought to trial by a common jury at Solbjerg outside Copenhagen. He was found guilty and executed in November 1517. This act precipitated the division between the king and aristocracy that ultimately led to Christian's deposition.

Christian's chief counsellor was Dyveke's mother, Sigbrit Willoms. Christian appointed her controller of the Sound Dues of Øresund, and took her advice on all financial matters. A bourgeoise herself, she acted to extend the influence of the middle classes, and formed an inner council, which competed with the Rigsraadet for power. Her influence was resented by the aristocracy, who blamed her for the king's favouring the working classes.

== Reconquest of Sweden ==
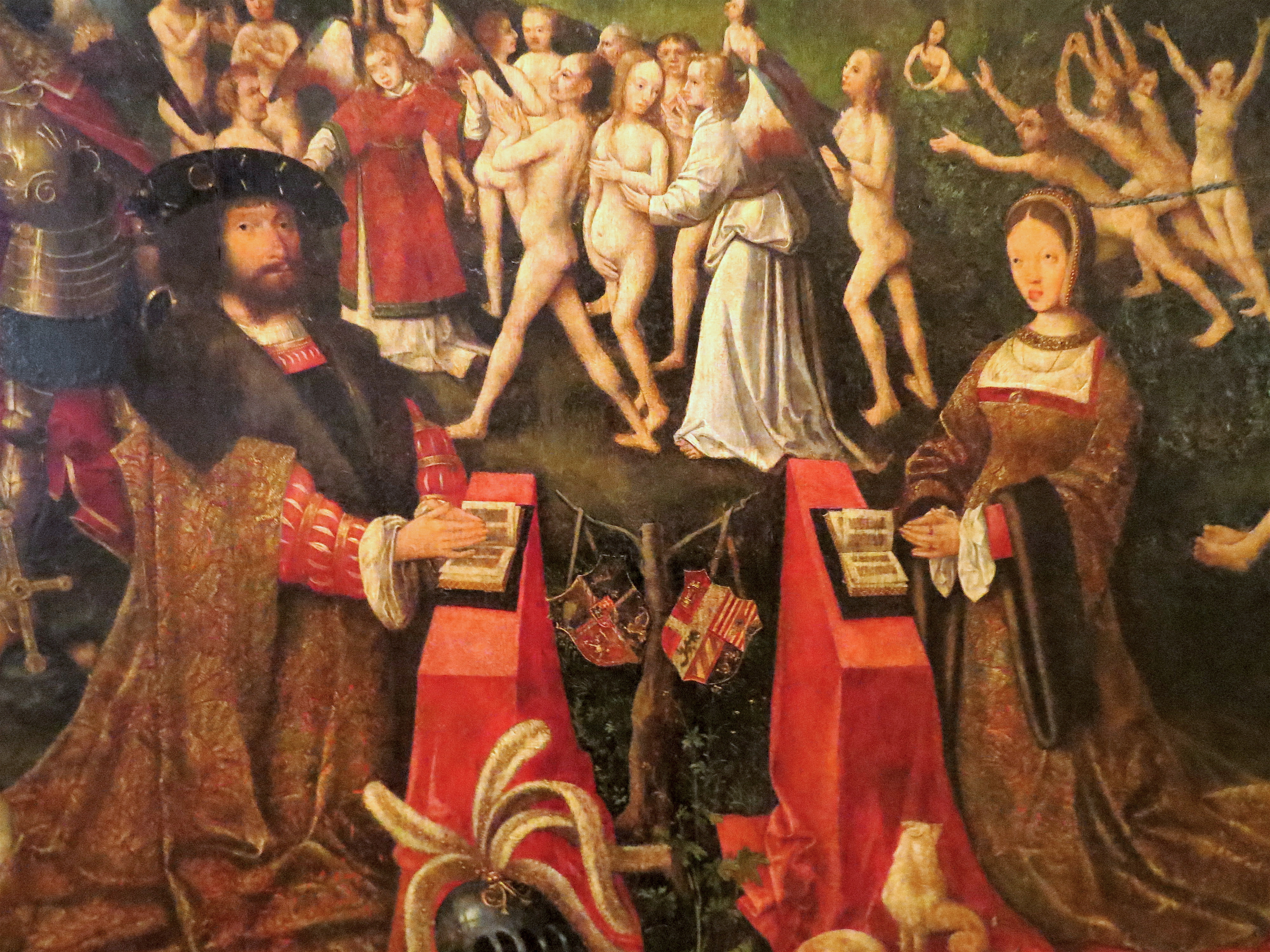
Christian and Isabella depicted on an altarpiece in Elsinore.

Christian was meanwhile preparing for the inevitable war with Sweden. The anti-Danish faction, headed by the regent Sten Sture the Younger, was opposed by the pro-Danish party led by Archbishop Gustav Trolle. In 1517 Christian dispatched ships and soldiers to the relief of the archbishop's fortress of Stäket, but was defeated by Sture and his peasant levies at Vedila. A second attempt the following year was also frustrated by Sture's victory at the Battle of Brännkyrka.

A third attempt made in 1520 with a large army of French, German and Scottish mercenaries proved successful. Sture was mortally wounded at the Battle of Bogesund on 19 January, and the remaining rebel forces were suppressed in April at the bloody Battle of Uppsala. Christian's army and navy then moved to Stockholm and besiege the city. Sweden was now under the leadership of Sture's widow Christina Gyllenstierna. Stockholm held out until September 1520, when Christina surrendered. Christian was crowned king of Sweden by Trolle in November, with the agreement of the Swedish Privy Council (Riksråd), who had, however, extracted an indemnity for the past and guarantee that Sweden should be ruled according to Swedish laws and custom.

=== Stockholm Bloodbath ===
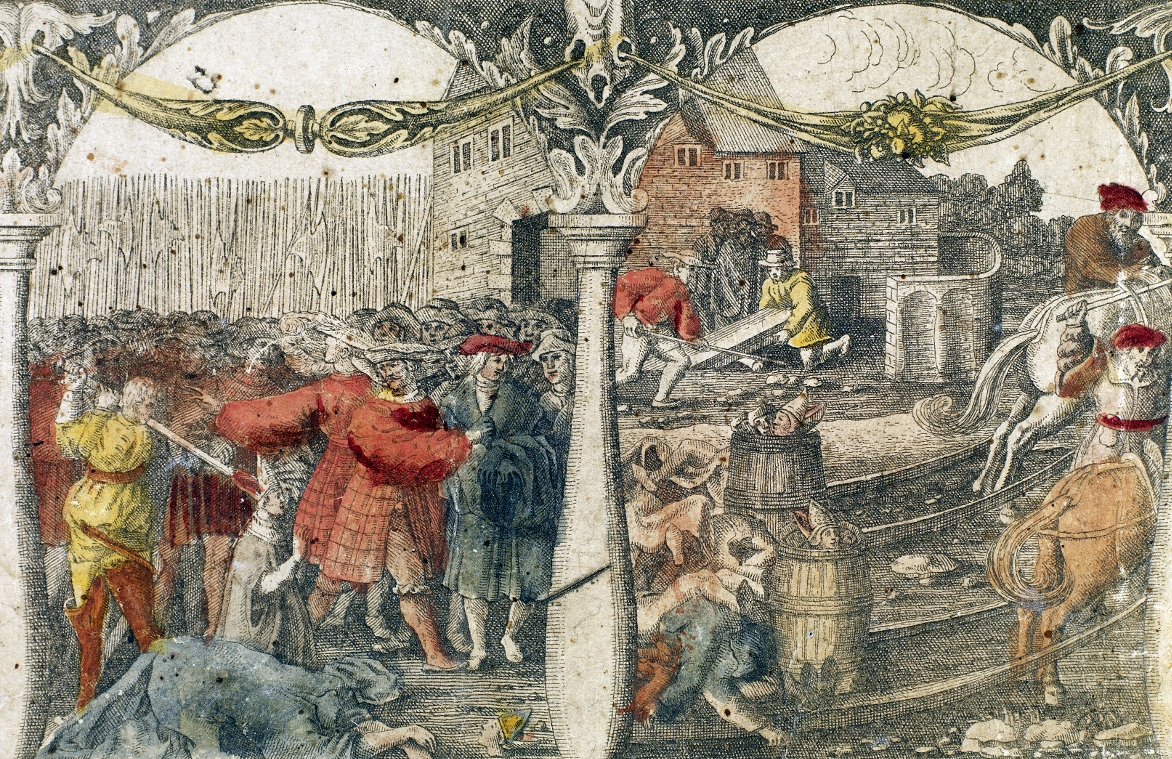
The Stockholm bloodbath depicted in a 1676 engraving by Dionysius Padtbrugge.

Three days after the coronation, Archbishop Trolle accused the followers of Sture of heresy for their part in the rising against him. Gyllenstierna used the fact that the Swedish Diet had made a 'swearing in common' (sammansvärjning) in 1517, which had bound the nobles to Sture's cause, in defence of her husband's followers. However, Christian seized on this as an opportunity to cement his control over Sweden by removing his opponents. He convened an ecclesiastical court which condemned all parties to the swearing in common. On 8 and 9 November eighty-two Swedish noblemen were executed at Stockholm castle, including the bishops of Skara and Strängnäs. As well as Sture's supporters, who had formed Trolle's original list, Christian's suspicious nature led him to even execute supporters of the Kalmar Union. The bodies of Sture and his child were dug up and burnt. Gyllenstierna and other noble Swedish ladies were sent as prisoners to Denmark.

The bloodbath, rather than cementing Christian's control of the Swedish throne, led in short order to Sweden's secession from the Kalmar Union. Didrik Slagheck, whom Christian appointed to the bishopric of Skara and as one of the three regents of Sweden, proved brutal and inept. The remaining Swedish nobility, appalled by the bloodbath, rose against Christian and the Swedish Diet elected Gustav Vasa regent and subsequently King of Sweden. On account of the massacre Christian is remembered in Sweden as Christian the Tyrant (Kristian Tyrann).

== Legal reforms and downfall ==
In June 1521, the Danish king paid a visit to Charles V in the Netherlands, where he remained for some months. He visited most of the large cities, made the personal acquaintance of Quentin Matsys and Albrecht Dürer, and met Erasmus, with whom he discussed the Protestant Reformation. Directly upon his return to Denmark in September 1521 Christian issued two bodies of laws – the Town Law and the Land Law – which governed respectively trade and the behaviour of the clergy. The Town Law strengthened the rights of tradesmen and peasants at the expense of the nobility. Trade was reorganised and was to be conducted solely through market towns, which were to be governed by officials appointed by the king. Trading in peasants was forbidden, and peasants were given the right to negotiate the terms of their tenure with the nobility. The Land Law permitted clergy to marry, and gave some control of the church over to the state. The new laws were radical, progressive, and perceived by the nobility and bishops as an existential threat.

By 1522, Christian was running out of allies. In an attempt to set up a Danish-centered trading company in direct competition with the Hanseatic League, Christian had raised the sound tolls, which affected trade between Sweden and the Hanseatic towns. As a consequence, Lübeck and Danzig joined the newly independent Sweden in war against Denmark. Domestic rebellion against Christian started in Jutland. On 20 January 1523, the herredag at Viborg offered the Danish crown to Christian's uncle, Duke Frederick of Holstein. Frederick's army gained control over most of Denmark during the spring, and in April 1523 Christian left Denmark to seek help abroad. On 1 May, he landed at Veere in Zeeland.

== Exile and imprisonment ==
Christian II at Sønderborg Castle, painting by Carl Bloch, 1871.

In exile Christian led a humble life in the city of Lier in the Netherlands (now in Belgium), waiting for military help from his brother-in-law Charles V. Christian corresponded with Martin Luther and he became a Lutheran for some time; he even commissioned a translation of the New Testament into Danish. Isabella died in January 1526, and Christian's children were taken by her family so as not to be raised as heretics. Popular agitation against Fredrick I in Denmark centered on Søren Norby, who gathered an army of peasants in Scania, but was defeated in 1525.

By 1531, Christian had reverted to Catholicism and reconciled with the Emperor. He took a fleet to Norway, and landed in Oslo to popular acclaim in November 1531. Christian failed to subdue Akershus Castle, and accepted a promise of safe conduct from Fredrick I, in 1532.

Frederick did not keep his promise, and Christian was kept prisoner for the next 27 years, first in Sønderborg Castle until 1549, and afterwards at the castle of Kalundborg. Stories of solitary confinement in small dark chambers are inaccurate; King Christian was treated like a nobleman, particularly in his old age, and he was allowed to host parties, go hunting, and wander freely as long as he did not go beyond the Kalundborg town boundaries.

Fredrick I died in April 1533, and the Danish Council of State was at first unable to choose a successor. The mayor of Lübeck, Jürgen Wullenwever, took advantage of the resulting interregnum to conspire for the restoration of Christian II to the throne of Denmark. He formed an alliance with two prominent nobles, Ambrosius Bogbinder and Jørgen Kock, mayor of Malmö. With Christopher, Count of Oldenburg as his military commander he succeeded in seizing Scania and Zeeland in the name of Christian II in a conflict known as the Count's Feud. However, Fredrick's eldest son, also named Christian, raised an army in Holstein which, led by Johann Rantzau, took in turn Holstein, Jutland and Zeeland in a series of brilliant military manoeuvers. He formed an alliance with Gustav Vasa, who subdued Scania, and took the throne as Christian III of Denmark. Christian II remained in prison in Kalundborg.

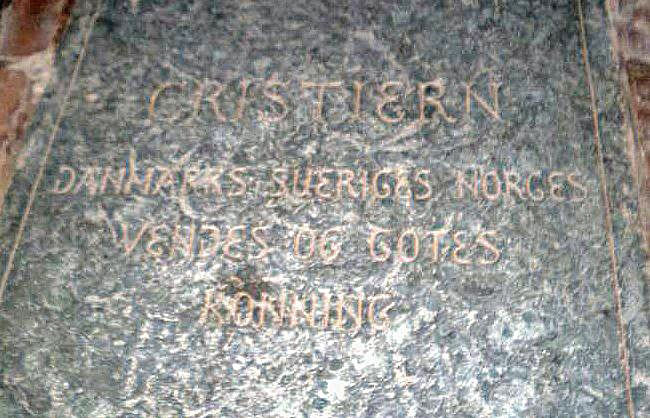
Christian's gravestone at Odense.

Christian II died in January 1559, a few days after Christian III. The new king, Frederick II, ordered that a royal funeral be held in his memory. He is buried in Odense next to his wife, parents, and son John, (Note: Hans in Danish) who died in the summer of 1532.

== In popular culture ==
Christian den Anden (Christian II) is an 1889 play by Jenny Blicher-Clausen which was performed at Copenhagen's Dagmar Theatre.

Jean Sibelius composed in 1898 incidental music King Christian II to a play about the king, and derived from it a suite.

The Fall of the King (Danish: Kongens Fald), a novel by the Danish author and Nobel Prize Laureate Johannes V. Jensen, published in three parts from 1900 to 1901, is considered a major work of modern Danish literature. It relates the tangled history of Christian II reign and downfall as seen by the (fictional) Mikkel Thøgersen, a loyal follower of king.

The Corridors of Time by Danish-American science fiction writer Poul Anderson includes a section where a modern American travels in time to 16th Century Denmark, arriving there shortly after Christian II's downfall – where he meets and befriends a diehard follower of the deposed King, and the two of them share various adventures.

The 2023 movie Stockholm Bloodbath is a highly fictionalized account of Christian II's life .

== Issue ==
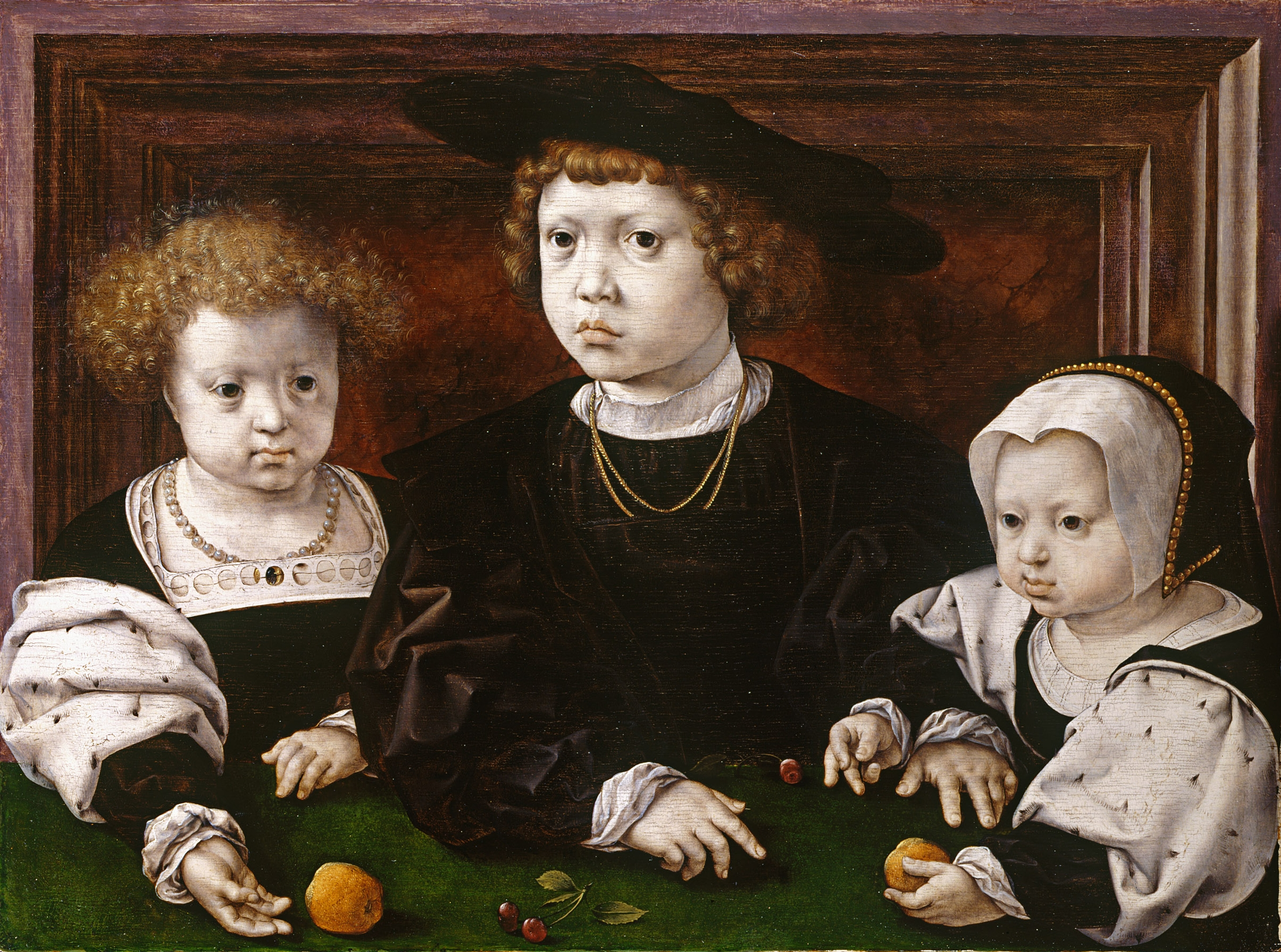
Three children of Christian II (Dorothea, John and Christina), by Jan Mabuse, 1526.

Christian II had six children by his wife, Isabella of Austria (1501–1526), only three of whom survived infancy and two reached adulthood. They were:

Name	Birth	Death	Notes
John	21 February 1518	2 August 1532	Heir to the thrones of Denmark, Norway and Sweden.
Philip Ferdinand	4 July 1519	1519	Twin
Maximilian	4 July 1519	1519	Twin
Dorothea	10 November 1520	31 May 1580	Married in 1535, Frederick II, Elector Palatine and had no issue.
Christina	c.1522	c.1590	Married in 1533, Francis II Sforza and had no issue. Married again in 1541, Francis I, Duke of Lorraine and had issue.
Stillborn son	January 1523	January 1523	Unnamed

== Bibliography ==
- This article incorporates text from a publication now in the public domain: Bain, Robert Nisbet (1911). "Christian II.". In Chisholm, Hugh (ed.). Encyclopædia Britannica. Vol. 6 (11th ed.). Cambridge University Press. pp. 274–276.
- Bisgaard, Lars (2019). Christian 2. : en biografi [Christian II : a biography] (in Danish). Copenhagen: Gads Forlag. ISBN 978-8712056973.
- Bricka, Carl Frederik (1887). Dansk biografisk Lexikon. Copenhagen: Gyldendal.
- Lockhart, Paul Douglas (2007). Denmark, 1513–1660 : the rise and decline of a Renaissance monarchy. Oxford University Press. ISBN 978-0199271214.
- Reiter, Paul Johann (1943). Kristian Tyrann. Personlighet, själsliv och livsdrama (in Swedish). Witting, Gustaf (tr). Natur och kultur.
- Scocozza, Benito (1997). "Christian 2.". Politikens bog om danske monarker [Politiken's book about Danish monarchs] (in Danish). Copenhagen: Politikens Forlag. pp. 102–110. ISBN 8756757727.

Christian II House of Oldenburg Born: 2 July 1481 Died: 25 January 1559
Regnal titles
Preceded by John	King of Denmark and Norway; 1513–1523	Succeeded by Frederick I
Preceded by John	Duke of Holstein and Schleswig; 1513–1523 with Frederick I	Succeeded by Frederick I and Christian III
Vacant Title last held by John II	King of Sweden; 1520–1521	Vacant Title next held by Gustav I
