= Dorothy of Sweden =

Dorothy of Sweden or Dorothea of Sweden - Swedish: Dorotea - may refer to:

- Dorothea of Brandenburg, Queen consort of Sweden 1447 and 1457
- Dorothea of Denmark, Electress Palatine, Princess of Sweden 1520
