= Isabella of Austria =

Queen of Denmark and Norway from 1515 to 1523

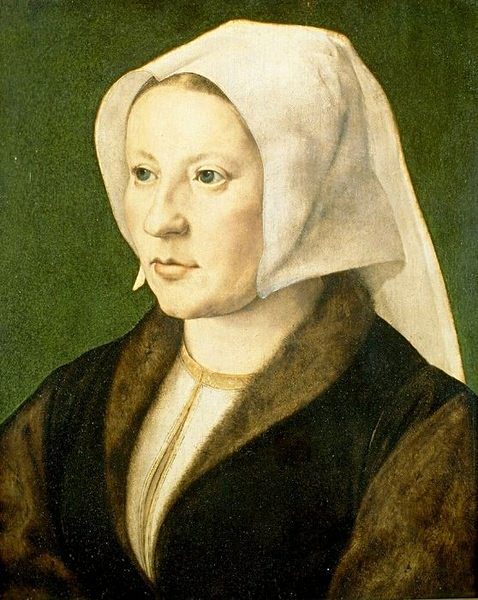
- Portrait of a woman, presumed to be of Isabella, by Jan Gossaert

Queen consort of Denmark and Norway
- Tenure: 12 August 1515 – 20 January 1523
- Coronation: 12 August 1515; Copenhagen Castle

Queen consort of Sweden
- Tenure: 1 November 1520 – 23 August 1521
- Born: 18 July 1501; Brussels, Duchy of Brabant, Holy Roman Empire
- Died: 19 January 1526 (aged 24); Ghent, County of Flanders, Holy Roman Empire
- Burial: St. Peter's Abbey, Ghent (1526–1883); St. Canute's Cathedral, Odense (since 1883)
- Spouse: Christian II of Denmark (m. 1514)
- Issue among others...: Prince John; Dorothea, Electress Palatine; Christina, Duchess of Milan
- House: Habsburg
- Father: Philip the Handsome
- Mother: Joanna of Castile

Isabella of Austria (Isabel; 18 July 1501 – 19 January 1526), also known as Elizabeth, was born an Archduchess of Austria and Infanta of Castile from the House of Habsburg, and subsequently became Queen of Denmark, Norway and Sweden, under the Kalmar Union, as the wife of King Christian II. She was the daughter of King Philip I and Queen Joanna of Castile and the sister of Charles V, Holy Roman Emperor. She ruled Denmark as regent in 1520.

Her upbringing, overseen by her aunt Archduchess Margaret, was marked by a comprehensive education in Mechelen under the guidance of notable humanists like Juan Luis Vives and Adrian of Utrecht. In 1514, she entered into a strategic marriage with Christian II of Denmark, Norway, and Sweden. However, the marriage encountered early challenges with diplomatic tensions arising from Christian II's existing relationship with Dyveke Sigbritsdatter, his Dutch mistress. Following Dyveke's death in 1517, the relations between Isabella and her husband significantly improved, and Isabella was entrusted with the position of regent in 1520 and political advisor to the king.

In 1523, her husband, King Christian II, was deposed. The political upheaval prompted the Danish royal family, including Isabella and her children, to seek refuge in various European states, such as England, Saxony and the Habsburg Netherlands. During this exile, Isabella strongly advocated for her husband's cause. In 1524, she participated in the Imperial Diet in Nürnberg, where she campaigned on behalf of King Christian II, seeking support for his restoration to the Danish throne.

Her travels through Germany, England, and the Netherlands contributed to her evolving religious sympathies for the Protestant movement. Isabella's death in 1526 prompted widespread mourning. She received both Protestant and Catholic communion, but the Habsburgs declared that she had died a fervent Catholic.

== Childhood and marriage ==
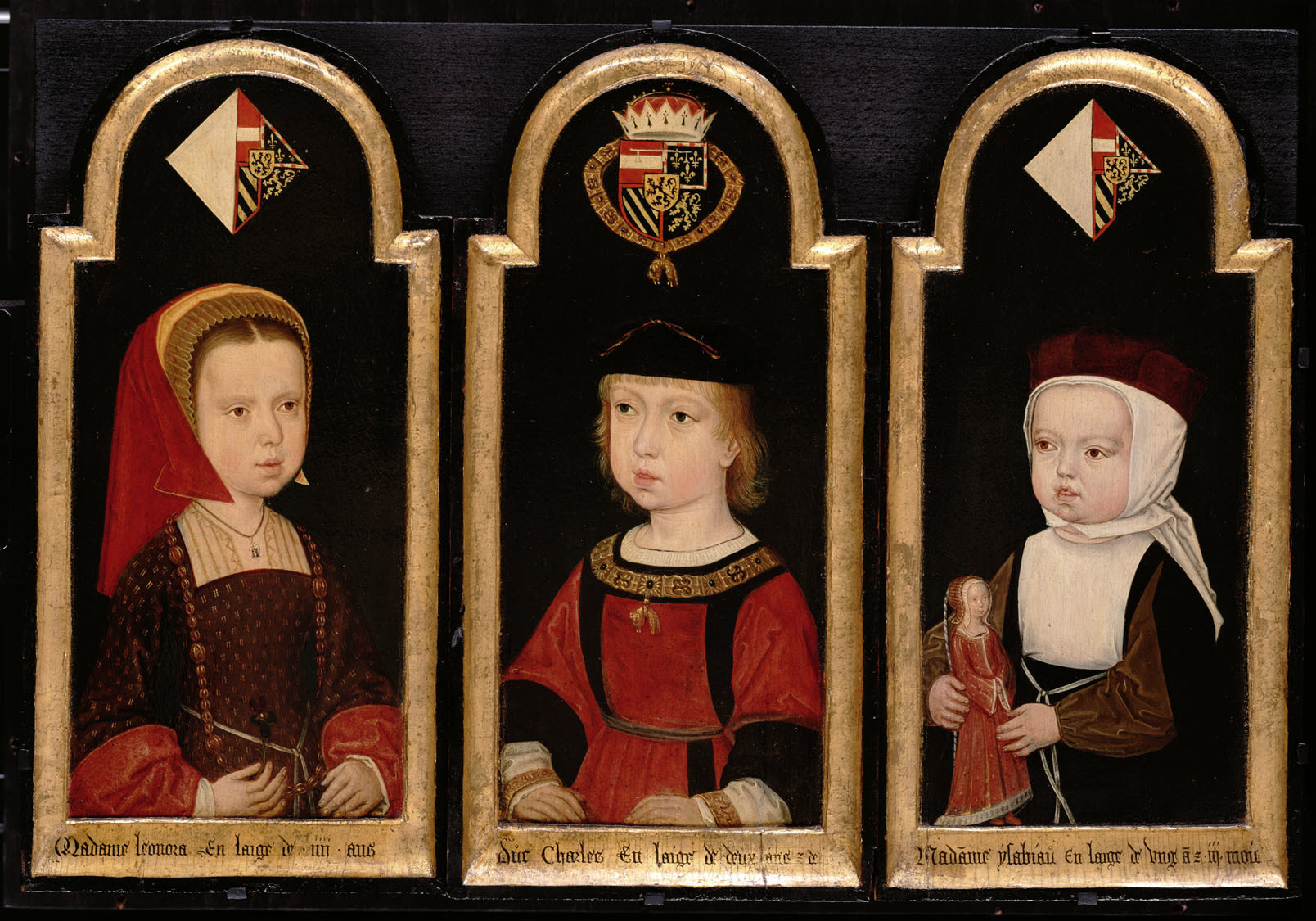
Portrait of Isabella, c.1503 at age 2. Isabella is on the right. She is pictured with her elder siblings, Charles and Eleanor.

Isabella was born on 18 July 1501 in Brussels as the third child of Philip the Handsome, ruler of the Habsburg Netherlands and Joanna the Mad, heiress to the Spanish kingdoms of Castile and Aragon. Her father was the son of the reigning Holy Roman Emperor Maximilian I and his deceased consort Mary, Duchess of Burgundy, while her mother was the daughter of the Catholic Monarchs Ferdinand II of Aragon and Isabella I of Castile, after whom she is named. She was baptized in Brussels by the Bishop of Cambrai, Henri de Berghes.

She had two older siblings, Eleanor and Charles, as well as three younger siblings Ferdinand, Mary and Catherine. Isabella and her siblings were considered the "noblest children" of her time. Her brothers became the most powerful men in Europe as Holy Roman Emperors. Her sisters became queens in Portugal and France, Bohemia and Hungary, respectively.

=== Upbringing at Mechelen ===
Following the early death of Isabella's father in September 1506, her mother's mental health reportedly began to deteriorate. Isabella, along with her brother, Charles, and her sisters, Eleanor and Mary, was put into the care of her paternal aunt, Archduchess Margaret, governor of the Habsburg Netherlands, while the two other siblings, Ferdinand and Catherine, remained in Castile. Eleanor, Isabella, and Mary were educated together at their aunt's court in Mechelen.

Margaret, a wise, staunch Catholic, and politically experienced woman, played a significant role in shaping Isabella's upbringing. Under her aunt's care, Isabella received a comprehensive education from the learned renaissance humanists of the time. Her upbringing at the opulent court in Mechelen afforded Isabella the finest education of her time, and among her notable tutors were Juan Luis Vives and the later Pope Adrian VI, who was associated with the pre-Reformation movement known as the "Brethren of the Common Life." The Brethren were viewed favourably by Martin Luther and Philipp Melanchthon for their emphasis on Christian devotion and self-sacrifice. Many members of this movement later aligned with the Protestant cause in its divergence from the authority of the papal church.

In her education, Isabella received instruction from Vives, covering Greek and Latin studies. The curriculum included a focus on the Gospels, St. Paul's Epistles, and select portions of the Old Testament.

Margaret acted as a maternal figure to her brother's children, and in October 1507, she informed her father, Emperor Maximilian I, who closely followed and actively participated in matters concerning his grandchildren, of Isabella and Maria contracting measles, with Eleonora showing symptoms. Due to the contagious nature of the disease and winter conditions, Margaret and Archduke Charles opted to stay in Brussels rather than returning to Mechelen as initially intended.

The household of the imperial children was headed by First Chamberlain, Charles de Croy-Chimay and Grand Mistress (stewardess) Anna de Beaumont, a Spanish-Navarrese noblewoman of French origin, who had been Juana’s former lady-in-waiting, arriving in the Low Countries with the duchess in 1498.

=== Matrimonial negotiations ===
Margaret heavily participated in the marriage negotiations of her nieces, including Isabella's. In 1509, Isabella's grandfather Emperor Maximilian proposed Henry of Navarre, son of John III, as a possible spouse, but the proposition was presumably dismissed by Margaret. By 1510, there were discussions about Isabel’s possible marriage to Charles II, Duke of Guelders, son of Adolf, Duke of Guelders. However, both Margaret and Maximilian harbored reservations about sending the young princess to Guelders, questioning the match's prestige. The Lord of Guelders held a lower rank as a duke, and their family's objective was to wed their daughters into royal houses.

Isabella's fortune, her succession rights, and her connections made her a valuable pawn in the royal marriage market. In 1513, Copenhagen hosted negotiations for the topic of the new King Christian II's marriage, leading to an agreement to pursue one of Philip the Beautiful's daughters. This alliance promised strategic advantages, creating kinship with the emperor and making King Christian the brother-in-law of Archduke Charles, a powerful figure in key Dutch cities. Furthermore, Habsburg-Austrian princesses were known for substantial dowries. King Christian enlisted the help of his uncle, Frederick III, Elector of Saxony, who, well-connected with the Emperor, inquired about suitable matches at the Imperial Court. In late October and early November, a national assembly in Viborg revisited the matrimonial issue, resolving to send an embassy to Emperor Maximilian for the formal proposal of Archduchess Isabella's hand. Bishop Gottschalk von Ahlefeldt, alongside Councilors Mogens Gjø and Albert Jepsen Ravensberg, was chosen to lead this envoy.

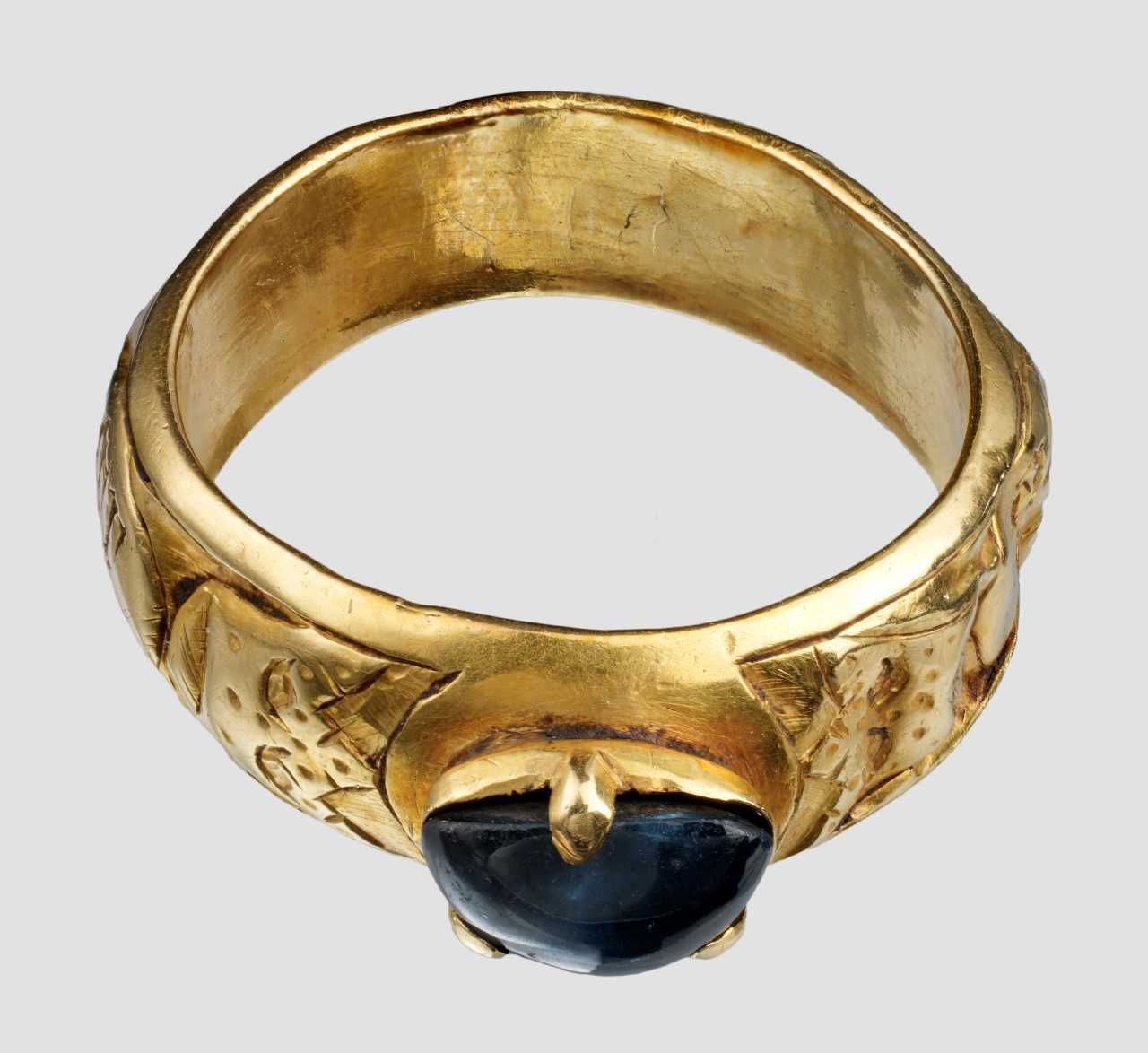
Wedding ring of Isabella; made of gold and adorned with an uncut sapphire. It bears the inscription: "Ave Maria gratia plena", i.e. the beginning of Hail Mary, the traditional Catholic prayer.

The king of Denmark had first intended to marry Isabella's eldest sister Eleanor of Austria, but the Habsburgs considered Eleanor too valuable for the throne of Denmark, because as the eldest sister, there was a likelihood that her descendants may succeed. Therefore, Isabella was selected for the Danish king. The Emperor expressed approval for the potential alliance with Denmark, a sentiment that found favor in the Low Countries. This alliance was viewed as a strategic opportunity to enhance trade access to the Baltic for merchants from Bruges and Amsterdam. The envoyship reached the imperial court in Linz in early April, engaging in month-long negotiations culminating in the signing of a marriage contract on 29 April 1514. The substantial dowry amounted to 250,000 Rhenish gulden, approximately equal to 800 million DKK today (about 118 million USD), with contributions from Spain and the Burgundian territories. Princess Isabella was also assured an annual income of 25,000 Rhenish gulden.

On 11 July 1514, one week short of her 13th birthday, Isabella was married by proxy to King Christian II of Denmark with Emperor Maximilian I, her grandfather, standing in for the king. The Bishop of Cambrai, Jacob van Croÿ, presided over the wedding which was conducted at the Brussels Palace.

She remained in the Netherlands, but is said to have fallen in love with her spouse at the sight of his painting, and asked to be taken to Denmark. A year after the wedding, the Archbishop of Nidaros, Erik Valkendorf, was sent to escort her to Copenhagen. The Danish fleet arrived in Veere, Zeeland on 1 July 1515, and later than month, a tearful Isabella departed on 16 July 1515. The fleet encountered a violent tempest, that dispersed the Danish convoy along the shores of Jutland. The vessel carrying the Queen narrowly averted shipwreck, and upon safely reaching Helsingør in the start of August, she penned a poignant letter to the Margaret: "Madame, if I could choose for myself, I should be with you now; for to be parted from you is the most grievous thing in the world to me". Isabella and Christian had their initial encounter at Hvidøre, Christian II's summer residence, where he greeted her with an elaborate entourage of over 1000 individuals.

The marriage was ratified on 12 August 1515, when she was 14 years old.

== Queen ==
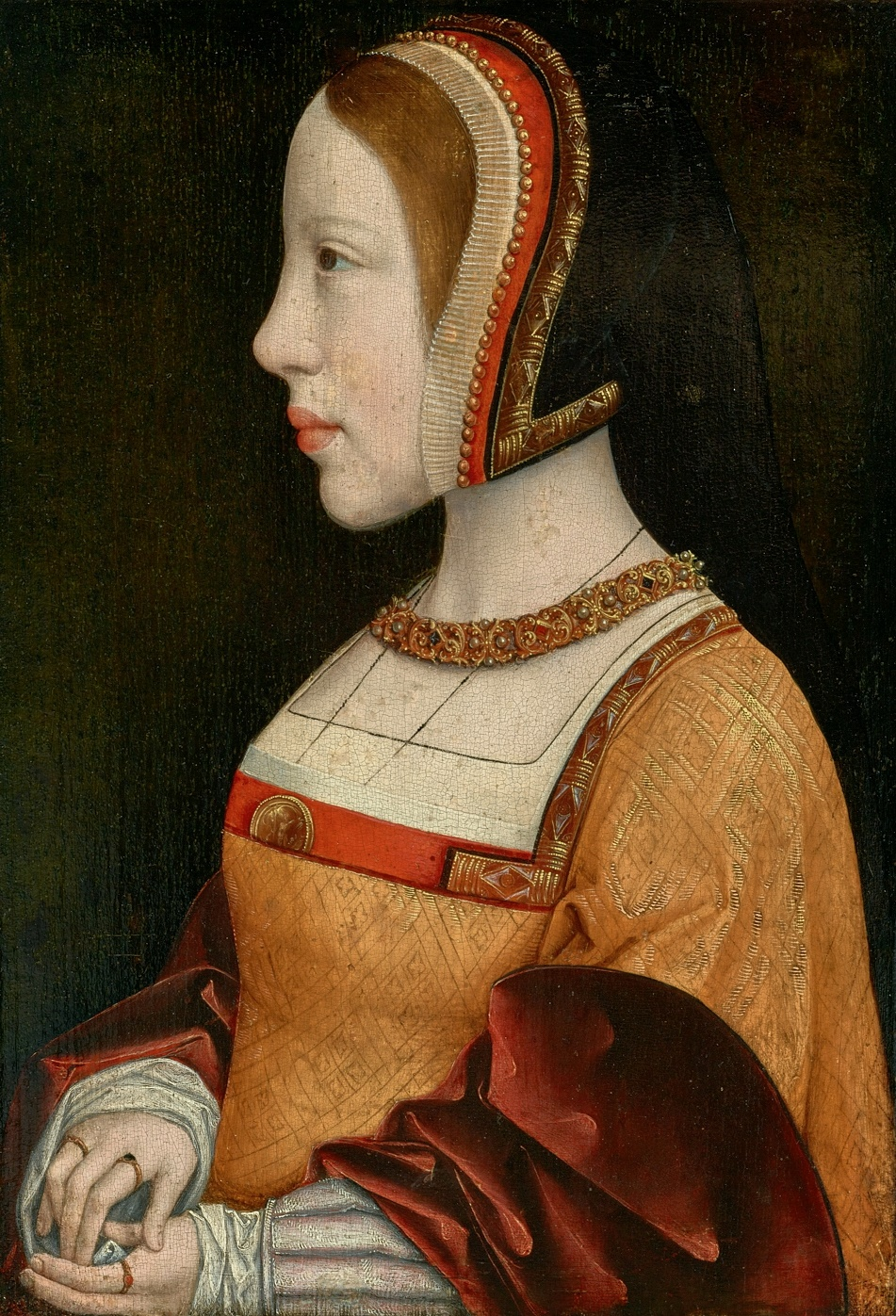
Portrait of Isabella around the time of her marriage by the Master of the Legend of the Magdalen, c. 1515.

Isabella was crowned Queen of Denmark and Norway, the same day of her matrimonial ratification, on 12 August 1515 at Copenhagen Castle by the Archbishop of Lund, Birger Gunnersen. She began using another version of her name, Elisabeth, but the relationship between her and her new family and Christian was quite cool during the first years of the marriage. The King's Dutch mistress, Dyveke Sigbritsdatter, had been with him since 1507, and he was not about to give her up for a teenager. Dyveke's mother, Sigbrit Willoms, was also influential at court, and Isabella was given less influence than both of them. This angered the Emperor, and caused some diplomatic strife between him and King Christian, but the matter was resolved when Dyveke died in 1517, and Isabella's relationship with her husband improved vastly over the next few years; her relationship with Sigbrit Willoms improved as well, and both women acted as political advisors to the king. From 1516, Anne Meinstrup was head lady-in-waiting of her court.

In 1520, Christian took the throne of Sweden, thereby making Isabella Queen of Sweden. After taking Stockholm, he asked the Swedish representatives to turn it and the regency of Sweden over to Isabella if he himself should die when his children were minors. She was to be the last Queen of Sweden who was also Queen of Denmark during the Kalmar union, but she in fact never visited Sweden; pregnant at the time of her spouse's accession to the throne of Sweden, she did not follow him there. Isabella served as the regent of Denmark during Christian's stay in Sweden. Her husband was deposed as king of Sweden the following year. King Christian imprisoned many Swedish noblewomen, related to rebellious Swedish nobles, at the infamous Blåtårn ("Blue Tower") of Copenhagen Castle, including Christina Gyllenstierna, Cecilia Månsdotter and Margareta Eriksdotter Vasa. Gustav I of Sweden used their purported harsh treatment in captivity in his propaganda against Christian II and claimed that the Danish monarch starved the women and children, who only survived by the mercy shown to them by the queen of Denmark, Isabella of Austria.

When King Christian was deposed in 1523 by disloyal noblemen supporting his uncle, Duke Frederick, the new king wanted to be on good terms with Isabella's family. He wrote her a personal letter in her native German, offering her a dowager queen's pension and permitting her to stay in Denmark under his protection while King Christian fled to the Low Countries. But Isabella replied in Latin "ubi rex meus, ibi regnum meum" ("where my king is, there is my kingdom").

== Exile ==
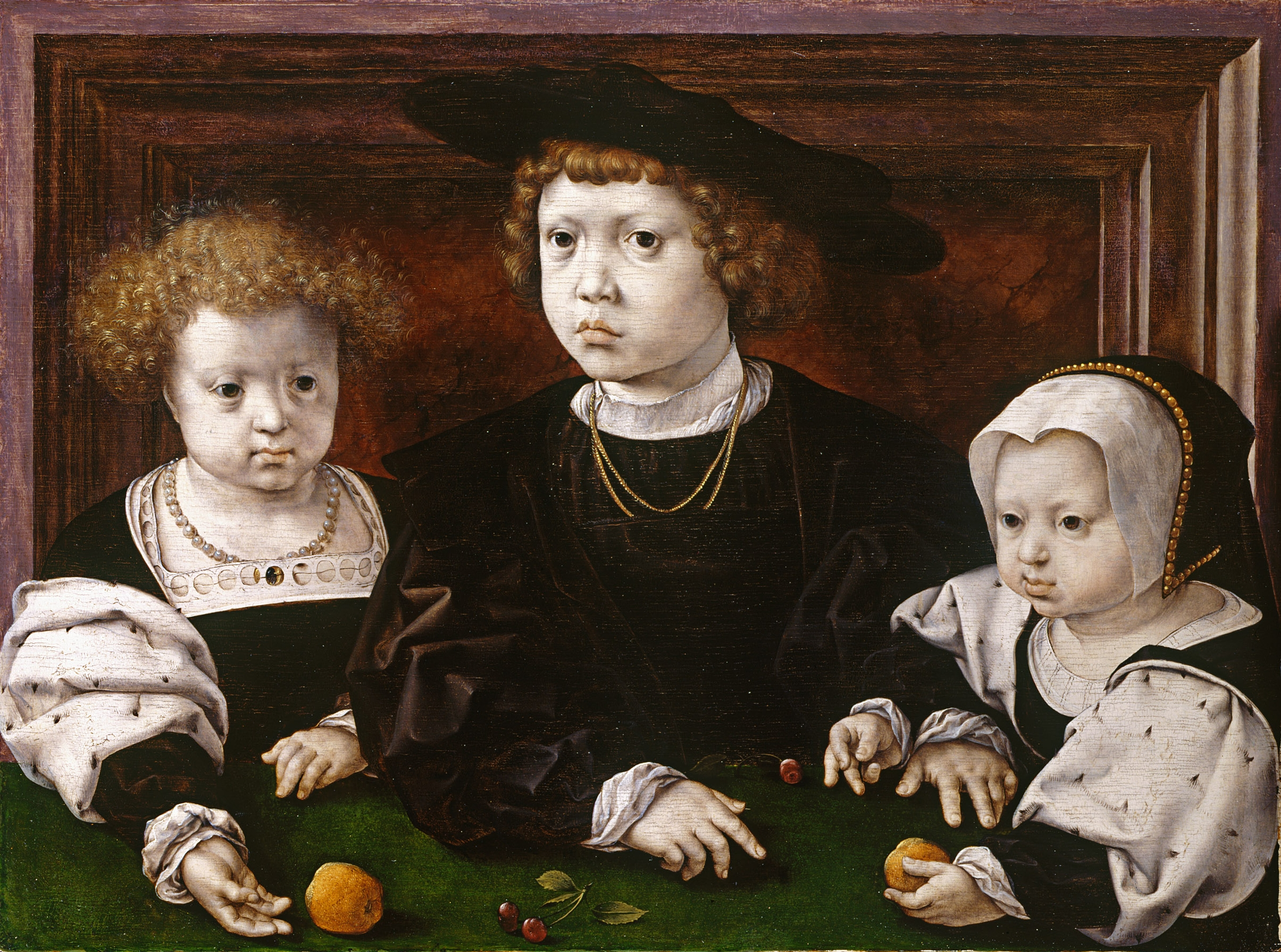
Three children of Christian II and Isabella: (Dorothea, John and Christina), by Jan Gossaert, 1526.

Isabella left Denmark with her husband and their children after her husband was deposed in 1523 and travelled to the Netherlands. Isabella and Christian travelled around Germany in an attempt to gain help for Christian's restoration to the throne. Isabella made her own negotiations with her relatives, and also accompanied her husband on his travels.

The Danish royal family then journeyed to England. While in England, they had an audience with Henry VIII at the Royal Palace in Greenwich and were later accommodated at Hampton Court Palace. They visited Saxony in 1523 and Berlin in 1523–1524. In Berlin, Isabella became interested in the teachings of Luther, and felt sympathy for Protestantism, however she never converted officially. When she visited Nürnberg in 1524, she received communion in the Protestant way, which so enraged her birth family, the Habsburgs, that Christian decided that she should hide her Protestant views in the future, for political reasons.

In the spring of 1525, Isabella caught some kind of serious illness, which worsened after she travelled through a storm later that year, and lasted all summer. The former queen died at the castle of Zwijnaarde near Ghent aged twenty-four, on 19 January 1526. She received both Protestant and Catholic communion, but the Habsburgs declared that she had died a convinced Catholic. Her religious sympathies, and whether she was a Protestant or a Catholic after 1524, have been debated. At her deathbed, she gave the cause of her husband's restoration to her aunt, the regent of the Netherlands, Margaret of Austria. She was buried on 4 February 1526 at the Saint Peter's Abbey, Ghent.

Isabella's early death was mourned not only in the Low Countries but also in her husband's realms. Nationwide funeral services were held, and expressions of grief were widespread for the Princess known as "the mother of her people." Testimonies to her worth were abundant, including a letter from Henry VIII of England, who regarded her as a sister. Martin Luther also paid tribute to her in his treatise on Holy Women.

Her fifteenth generation great-granddaughter, Princess Isabella of Denmark, was named after her.

== Cultural depictions ==
=== Literature ===
- Bruden fra Gent (English: The Bride from Ghent) – a 2003 historic novel by Dorrit Willumsen about King Christian II, Dyveke and mother Sigbrit, and about the marriage in 1515 with the only 14-year-old Elisabeth.

== Issue ==
Name	Birth	Death	Notes
John	21 February 1518	11 August 1532	died young.
Philip Ferdinand	4 July 1519	1519	twins, died in infancy.
Maximilian	4 July 1519	1519	twins, died in infancy.
Dorothea	10 November 1520	31 May 1580	married in 1535, Frederick II, Elector Palatine and had no issue.
Christina	November 1521	10 December 1590	married in 1533, Francesco II Sforza and had no issue, married secondly in 1541, Francis I, Duke of Lorraine and had issue.
Unnamed son	January 1523	January 1523	stillborn.

== Bibliography ==
- Cartwright, Julia (1913). Christina of Denmark: Duchess of Milan and Lorraine, 1522-1590. E.P. Dutton. ISBN 978-0-404-09205-4.
- Heiberg, Steffen, ed. (2001). Danske dronninger i tusind år (2. udg., 1. opl ed.). København: Gyldendal. ISBN 978-87-00-75146-0.
- Jørgensen, G. (1901). Dronning Elisabeth af Danmark (in Danish). G.E.C. Gad. ISBN 978-1172156450.
- Olsen, Rikke Agnete (2005). Kongerækken. København: Lindhardt og Ringhof. ISBN 978-87-595-2525-8.
- Skipper, Jon Bloch, ed. (2006). Danmarkshistoriens årstal [The Dates of Danish history.] (in Danish) (2. rev. udg ed.). København: Aschehoug. ISBN 978-87-11-11597-8.
- Ylä-Anttila, Tupu (2019). Habsburg Female Regents in the Early 16th Century. Faculty of Arts. Helsinki: University of Helsinki. ISBN 978-951-51-5701-0.

Isabella of Austria House of Habsburg Born: 18 July 1501 Died: 19 January 1526
Royal titles
Vacant Title last held by Christina of Saxony	Queen consort of Denmark and Norway; 1515–1523	Succeeded by Sophie of Pomerania
Vacant Title last held by Christina of Saxony	Queen consort of Sweden; 1520–1521	Vacant Title next held by Catherine of Saxe-Lauenburg
