= Rebola =

Rebola may refer to:

- Reboly or Rebol´a, a settlement in Russia
- Rebola, Equatorial Guinea, a town in Equatorial Guinea
- Rebola, a song by the Lacração Twins
- Rebola, a wine found in Rimini, Italy

== See also ==
- Rebola, Bola, a song by Carmen Miranda
