= Hans of Denmark (1518–1532) =

Heir apparent of Christian II

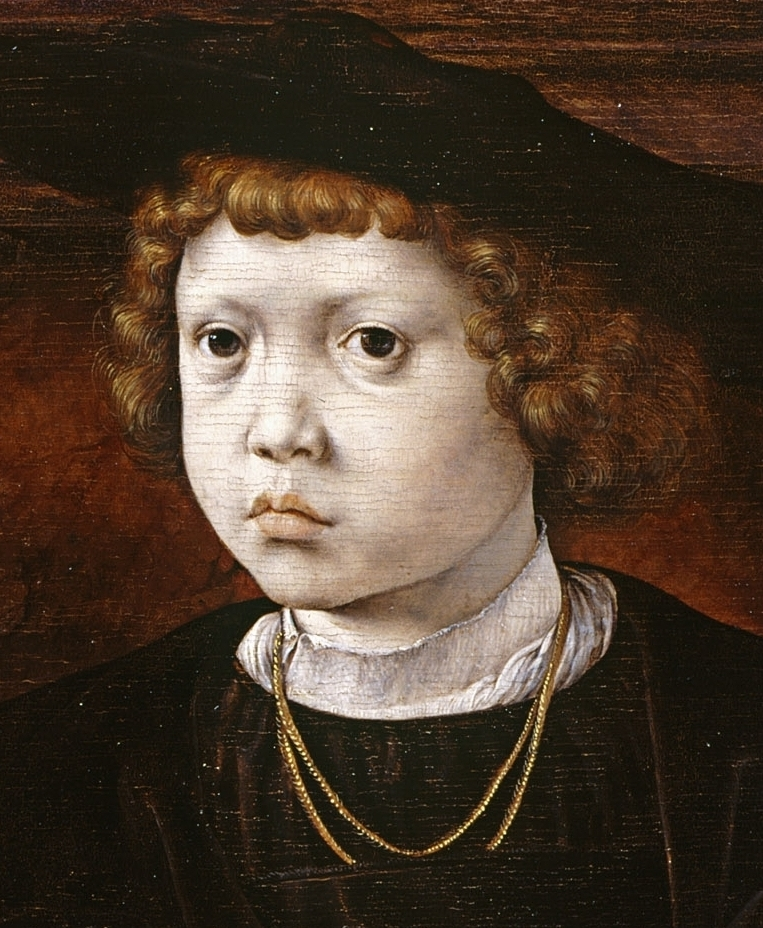
- Portrait by Jan Gossaert, 1526
- Born: 21 February 1518; Copenhagen, Denmark
- Died: 11 August 1532 (aged 14); Regensburg, Bavaria
- Burial: St. Peter's Abbey, Ghent (1532–1883); St. Canute's Cathedral, Odense (since 1883)
- House: Oldenburg
- Father: Christian II of Denmark
- Mother: Isabella of Austria

Hans of Denmark (also called John of Denmark; 21 February 1518 – 11 August 1532) was the eldest child of King Christian II and Queen Isabella of Denmark and Norway.

== Biography ==
Born at Copenhagen Castle, Hans was named after his paternal grandfather, King Hans. Hans had two younger sisters, Dorothea, the future Electress of the Palatinate, and Christina, the future Duchess of Lorraine.

King Christian II was deposed in 1523 by his uncle, who took the throne as King Frederick I. During the years of their exile, Hans and his family had a small court in the city of Lierre (now Lier, Flanders, Belgium) in the Duchy of Brabant of the Habsburg Netherlands, waiting for the military help of Hans's maternal uncle, Holy Roman Emperor Charles V.

In 1531, Christian II called a meeting in Oslo on St. Andrew's Day in an attempt to persuade the riksråd (National Council of Norway) to recognize Hans as the rightful heir and to afterwards crown him as the next King of Norway. Meanwhile, the Emperor took Hans to Regensburg, then a Free Imperial City in Bavaria. As the eldest grandson of Philip the Handsome, he was to play a role in Habsburg politics, but died on 11 August at Charles V's house in Regensburg. He was buried in St. Peter's Abbey in Ghent, also in the Habsburg Netherlands, but his remains were exhumed and transported to St. Canute's Cathedral in Odense, Denmark, in 1883. He is portrayed as gifted and intelligent, capable of running a country.

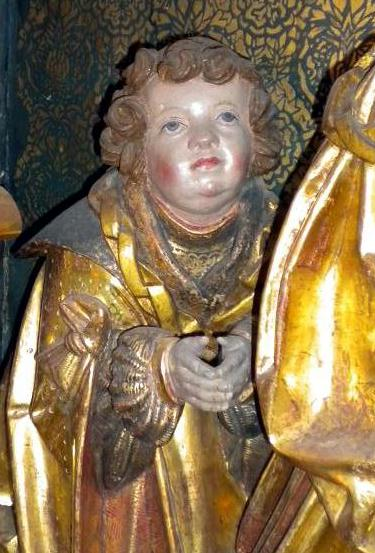
c. 1530 sculpture in Odense

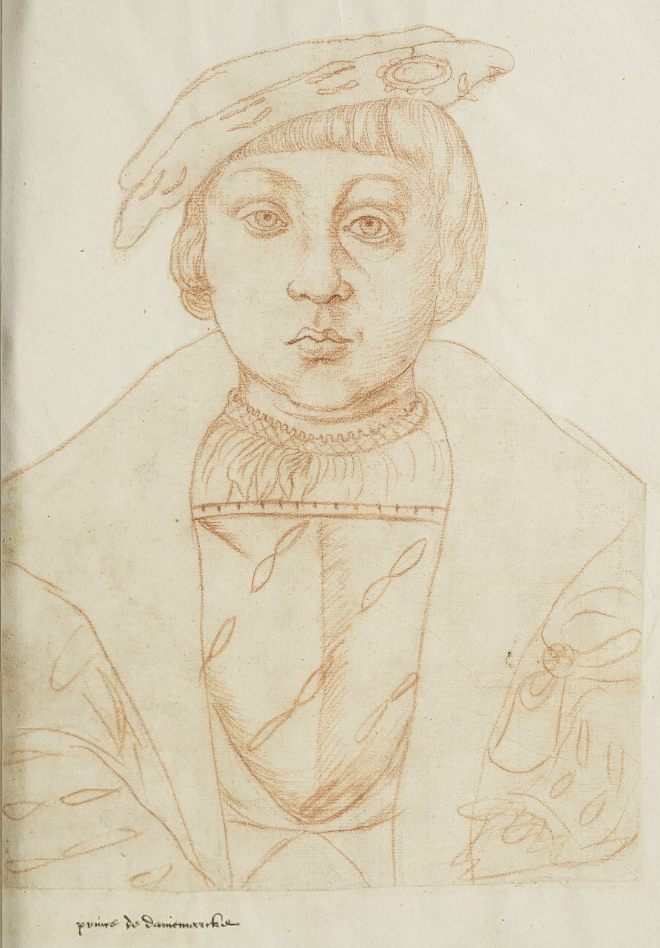
Drawing by Jacques de Boucq, c. 1570
