= Robledo =

Robledo may refer to:

- Robledo (name)
- Robledo (volcano), in Argentina
- Robledo, Spain, a municipality in Albacete in Spain
- Robledo de Chavela, a municipality in the Community of Madrid, in Spain
- Robledo Mountains, in Las Cruces, New Mexico, United States
- Robledo, a fictional Southern California town in Octavia E. Butler's novel Parable of the Sower
