= Jenny Blicher-Clausen =

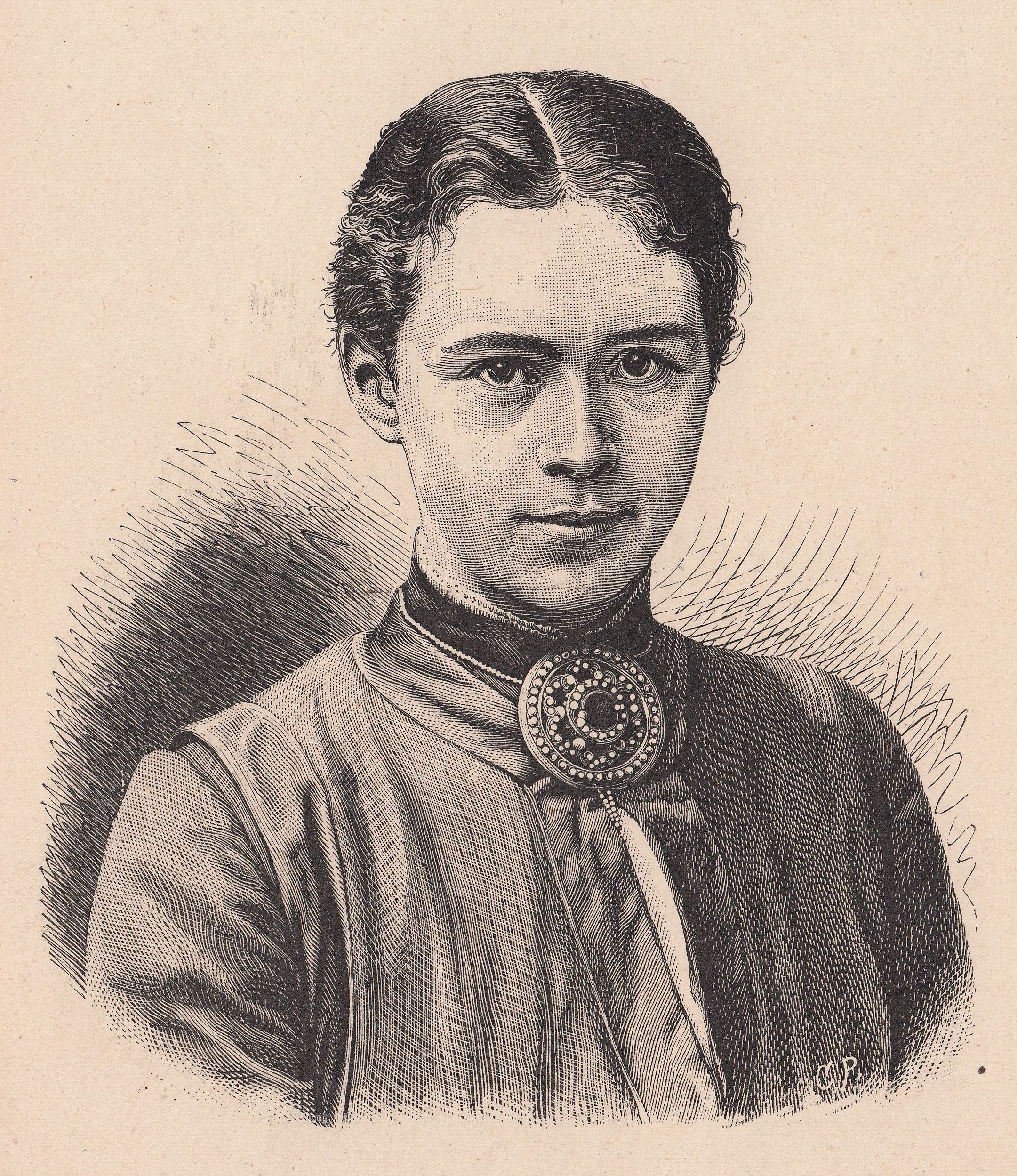
Jenny Blicher-Clausen (c. 1894)

Jenny Frederikke Blicher-Clausen, pen name John Bentsen, (1865–1907) was a Danish writer who is most notable for her poetry, especially for her first publication Digte (Poems, 1885) and for Violin (1900). She also wrote plays, including Christian den Anden (Christian II, 1889) which was performed at Copenhagen's Dagmar Theatre. She gained popularity not only in Denmark but in Germany, Sweden and Finland. The composer Rued Langgaard was inspired to put some of her poems to music.

== Biography ==
Born on 29 July 1865 in Durup Parish, Sallingsund Municipality, Jenny Frederikke Blicher was the daughter of the parish priest Jens Mathias Blicher (1822–1893) and his wife Frederikke Severine née Balle (1833–1910). In March 1892, she married the cleric Henrik Nikolaj Clausen (1858–1901). They had one daughter, Inga (born 1897).

When she was only 13, she submitted a manuscript to the Royal Danish Theatre. Although her play was rejected, she sent in a new work five years later which, though rejected, was accompanied by a positive response which encouraged her to write poetry. As a result, she was encouraged to complete her first publication, Digte, which was published in 1885 under the pen name John Brentsen. Using the same pen name, she went on to publish Ebba Brahe og andre Digte (Ebba Brahe and Other Poems) in 1888. Thereafter she used her own name, J. Blicher to publish the play Christian den Anden in 1889, which was performed at the Dagmar Theatre, and a new collection of poems Fra Markvejen (From the Country Road) in 1890. One of her major poetic works was Violin (1900) with its follow-up Den sidste Hauge (1903).

Jenny Blicher-Clausen died in the Frederiksberg district of Copenhagen on 14 February 1907. She was buried in Søllerød.
