= The Corridors of Time =

1965 novel by Poul Anderson

- Cover of the first edition
- Author: Poul Anderson
- Cover artist: Thomas Chibbaro
- Language: English
- Subject: Time travel
- Genre: Science fiction
- Published: 1965 (Doubleday)
- Publication place: United States
- Pages: 209
- OCLC: 505736567

The Corridors of Time is a science fiction novel by the American writer Poul Anderson that was first published in 1965 as a serial in Amazing Stories (May–June 1965), and as a book by Doubleday.

== Background ==
The Corridors of Time alternates between the European Stone Age and a repressive future. In its vision of tomorrow, almost everyone is either an agricultural serf or an industrial slave, but the rulers genuinely believe that they are creating a better world. Set largely in Denmark, it treats the Neolithic society with knowledge and respect but does not hide its own faults. It is there that the protagonist, having access to literally all periods of the past and future, finally decides to settle down and finds a happy and satisfying life.

== Characters ==
- Malcolm Lockridge, a man of the twentieth century who is sent to prison after an accidental murder and is released to join the Warden camp
- Storm Darroway, leader of the Warden faction (eastern hemisphere in the future)
- Brann, leader of the Ranger faction (western hemisphere in the future)
- Auri, Neolithic character
- Withucar, Neolithic character
- Jesper Fledelius, 17th-century Danish follower of Warden Queen Storm
- Mareth known as Marcus Nielsen, hedge row priest and Warden war lord
- John and Mary, continental advisors in a future in which there is no camp guard or gendarmes
