= Dorothea of Denmark, Electress Palatine =

Electress Palatine from 1544 to 1556

Dorothea of Denmark
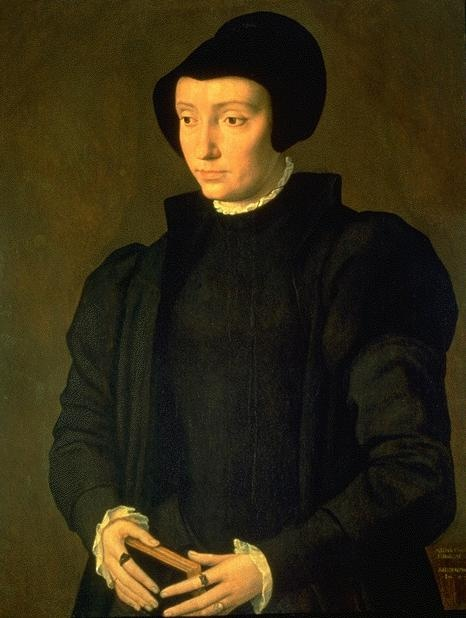
- Portrait by Michiel Coxcie, 1545

Electress Palatine
- Tenure: 16 March 1544 – 26 February 1556
- Born: 10 November 1520; Copenhagen
- Died: 31 May 1580 (aged 59); Neumarkt in der Oberpfalz
- Burial: Church of the Holy Ghost, Heidelberg
- Spouse: Frederick II of the Palatinate (m. 1535; died 1556)
- House: Oldenburg
- Father: Christian II of Denmark
- Mother: Isabella of Austria

Dorothea of Denmark and Norway (10 November 1520 – 31 May 1580) was a Danish, Norwegian and Swedish princess and an electress of the Palatinate as the wife of Elector Frederick II of the Palatinate. She was a claimant to the Danish, Norwegian and Swedish thrones and titular monarch in 1559–1561.

== Biography ==
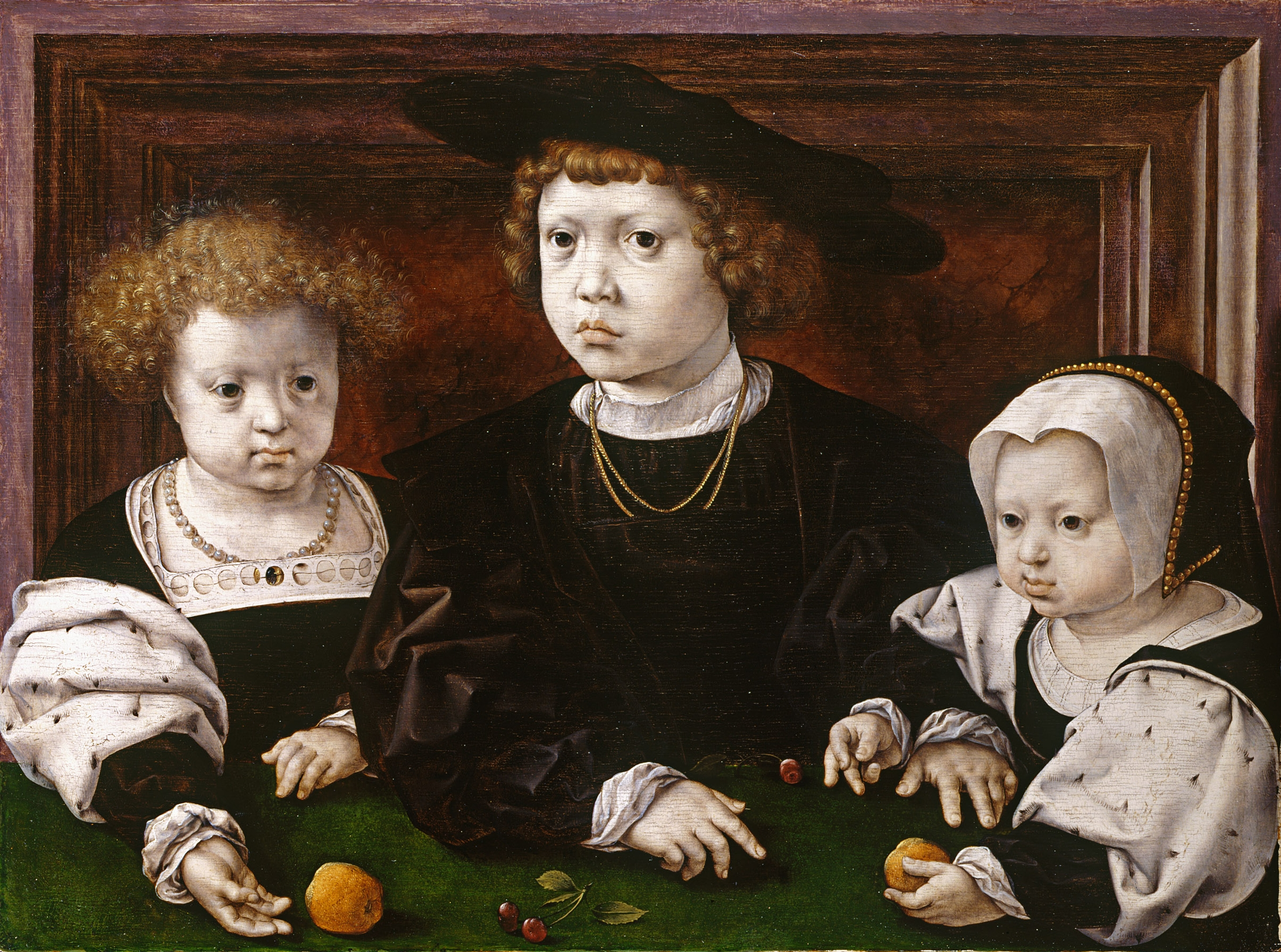
The three children of King Christian II: Dorothea, John and Christina. Painting by Jan Mabuse, 1526

Princess Dorothea was born on 10 November 1520 as the fourth child and eldest daughter born to King Christian II of Denmark and Norway and Isabella of Austria, sister of Holy Roman Emperor Charles V. Dorothea had an elder brother, John, born 21 February 1518. Her elder twin brothers, Philip Ferdinand and Maximilian, born 4 July 1519, had both died before her birth, the latter in 1519 and the former in 1520. Her sister Christina was born two years later, in November 1521, and was her only sibling to reach adulthood. Christina would marry twice, first to Francis II, Duke of Milan, and secondly to Francis I, Duke of Lorraine.

On 20 January 1523, disloyal nobles forced her father to abdicate and offered the throne to his uncle, Duke Frederick of Holstein. That month, her mother gave birth to a stillborn son. Three-year-old Dorothea and her sister and brother followed their exiled parents to Veere in Zeeland, the Netherlands, and were taken care of by the Dutch regents, their grandaunt and aunt, Margaret of Austria and Mary of Hungary. Her mother died when she was five years old, on 19 January 1526. The Dutch court was an officially Catholic environment, but influenced with a sympathy for Protestantism, and Dorothea herself acquired Protestant sympathies early on.

Dorothea was the object of marriage proposals very early. She has been described mostly in comparison with her sister, and referred to as beautiful, shorter and slighter than her sister. In 1527, England's Thomas Cardinal Wolsey proposed Henry VIII's son the Duke of Richmond as a match for either Dorothea or Christina, but this proposal was not accepted by the Habsburgs because Richmond was illegitimate.

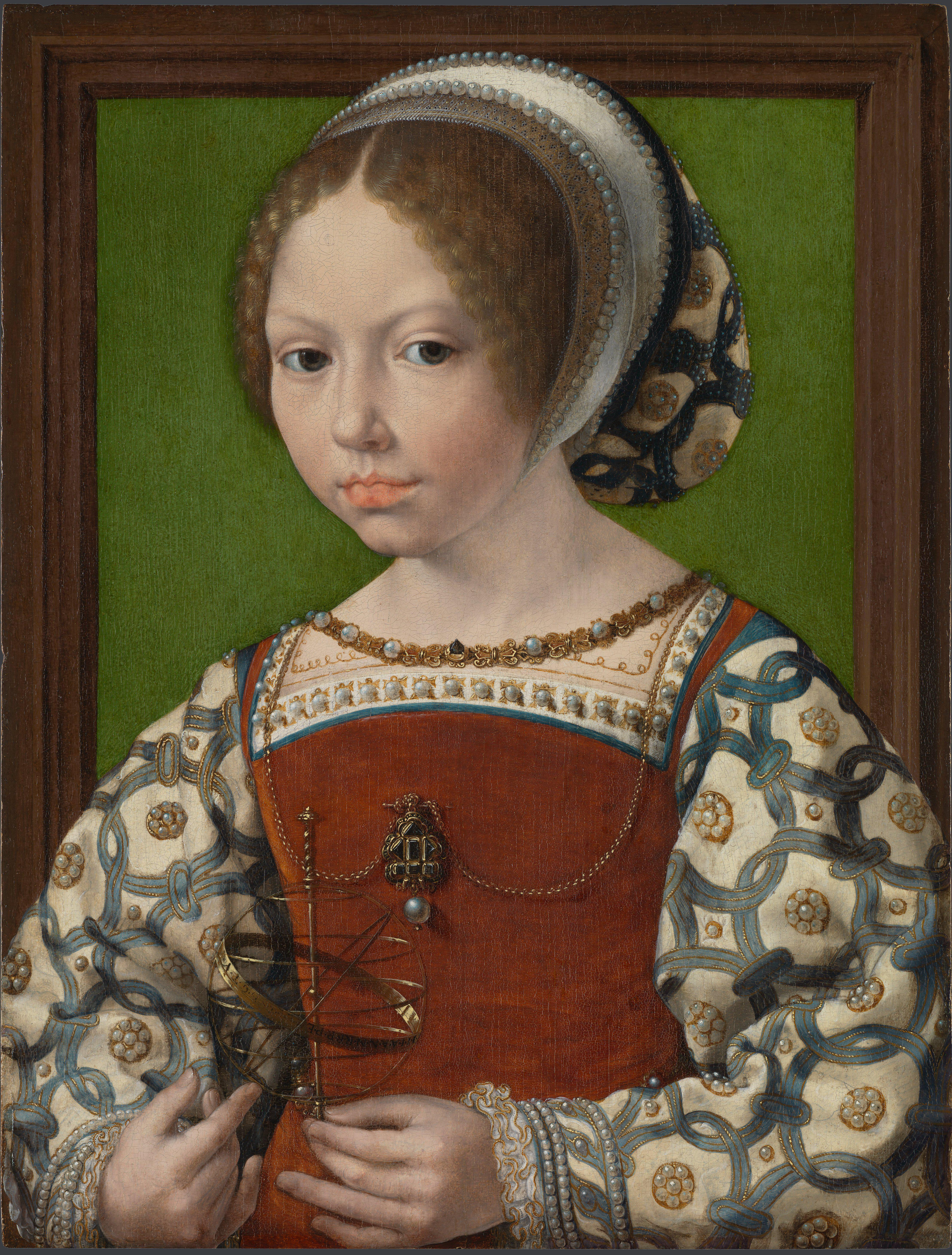
Portrait of a young princess, possibly of Dorothea, by Jan Gossaert c. 1530

Her brother Hans died in 1532 at about fourteen years old. As the eldest surviving child of the abdicated Christian II, Dorothea had a claim to the Danish, Norwegian and Swedish thrones. Because of this, King Frederick of Denmark suggested that Dorothea marry his youngest son, Prince John, after which he would name John his heir and leave his eldest son and current heir Christian as heir to the Duchy of Schleswig-Holstein instead. This was rejected by the Emperor and regent Mary because they did not wish to negotiate with Frederick, whom they regarded as an usurper. The matter became moot when Frederick died in 1533. In 1532, she received a proposal from the Duke of Milan, but the Emperor chose her sister for that match instead. Dorothea was long expected to marry King James V of Scotland, but the plan was never brought to fruition in fear of offending the French monarch, who wished for James to make a French match, compounded with the difficulty of finding a suitable dowry for her.

=== Marriage ===
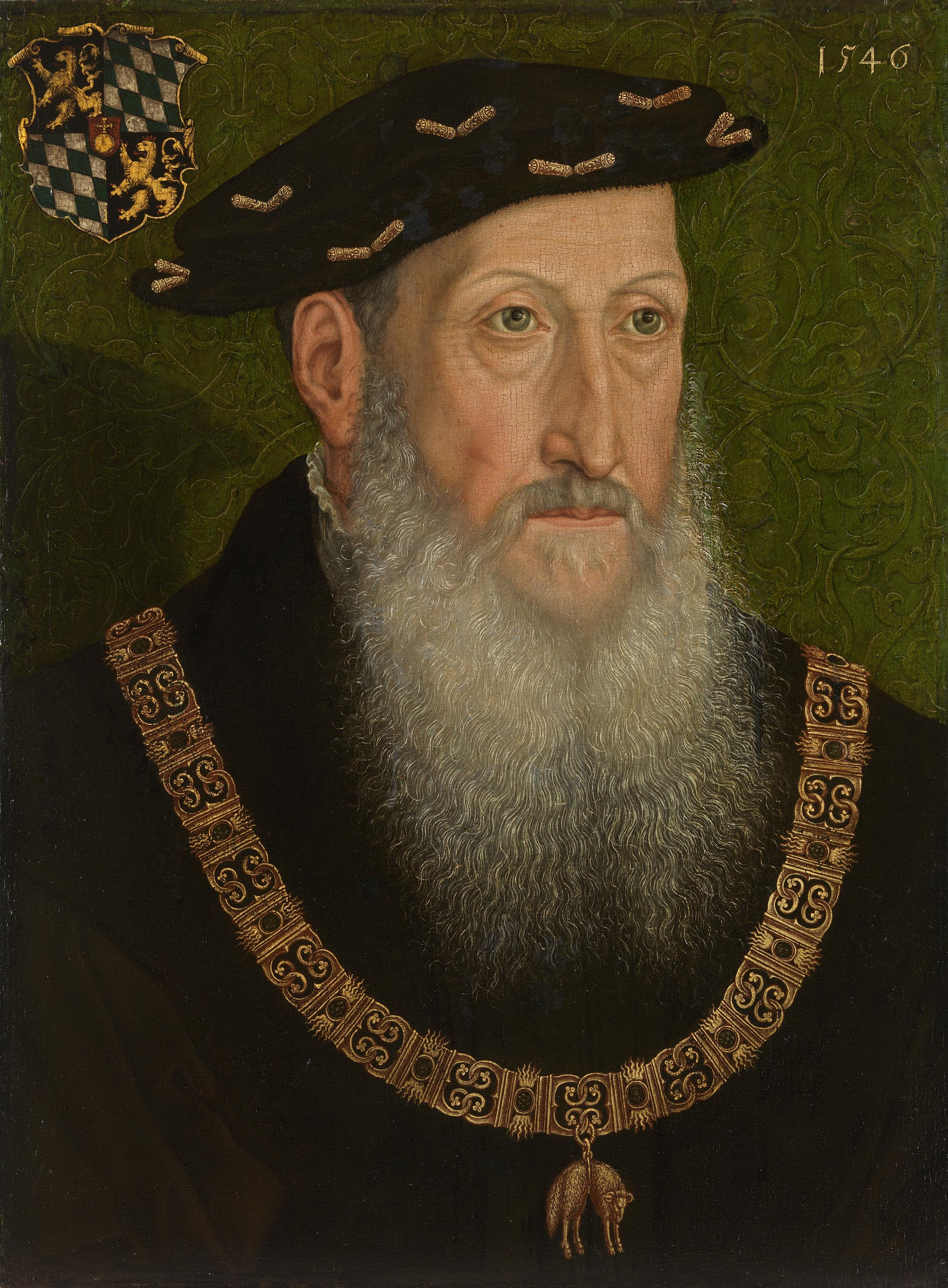
Dorothea's husband Frederick of the Palatinate. Portrait by Hans Besser, 1545.

On 18 May 1535, Dorothea married Frederick of the Palatinate in Brussels, and then in person in Heidelberg, from which they continued to their home in Neumarkt. Frederick had served as a loyal ally of the Emperor, and long desired to marry into the Imperial house. However, his proposals to the Emperor's sisters and nieces had been rejected. To prevent him from entering a French match, the Emperor's brother suggested he propose to Dorothea, who was a ward of the Emperor. Mary of Hungary, Regent of the Netherlands and foster mother of Dorothea, supported the match as a way of supporting Dorothea's claims on the Danish throne and thereby bolstering Imperial influence in northern Europe. At the time of the marriage, the succession of Christian III of Denmark was contested, there was a war in Denmark and Copenhagen was occupied by the Hanseatic League. The Habsburg family selected Frederick to be her consort, as they believed that he could successfully claim the Danish throne through marriage. After the election of Christian III of Denmark to the Danish throne in 1536, however, her chance of succeeding to the Danish throne was realistically over. The Emperor was not very interested in the matter of Denmark.

Dorothea became popular in the Palatinate. She had a good relationship with Frederick and his family. The couple had similar characters, shared a love for adventure and festivities, and she "was always ready to accompany him on perilous journeys, to climb mountains or ford rivers, with the same unquenchable courage and gaiety of heart." She had no children. In her anxiety to conceive, she went on pilgrimages and wore holy girdles: "this was done without any spirit of devotion, but with great mirth and laughter."

In 1537–38, she hosted her sister Christina, the Dowager Duchess of Milan, during her journey back to the Netherlands from Italy. Dorothea and Frederick were described as great spendthrifts, and it was said that she was not happy until she had spent her last penny. As Frederick was of the same character, their common waste of money indebted them greatly.

Frederick and Dorothea never gave up her claim to the throne of Denmark, and worked actively to have the Emperor support it. In 1539, they visited the Emperor in Spain to press the matter, but without success. Dorothea was a personal friend of the Empress, Isabella of Portugal, and when Isabella died that same year, they lost an ally in their attempts to persuade the Emperor. The couple visited the French court on their way back to the Netherlands, where Dorothea attracted the attention of the French king to such a degree that her aunt the Queen of France, Eleanor of Austria, reportedly kept to her side at all times to prevent her from becoming the lover of the King. In 1540, Dorothea supported her sister Christina's desired love marriage to René, Prince of Orange.

In February 1540, Dorothea was commissioned by Frederick to visit and plead her father's cause with the Emperor, to prevent a renewal of the truce between the Netherlands and King Christian III. After consulting Archbishop Carondelet, the President of the council, and Granvelle, Dorothea and Christina sent the following petition to the Emperor:

"My sister and I, your humble and loving children, entreat you, as the fountain of all justice, to have compassion on us. Open the prison doors, which you alone are able to do, release my father, and give me advice as to how I may best obtain the kingdom which belongs to me by the laws of God and man."

The appeal was unsuccessful however.

In 1544, Frederick became Elector Palatine. The Emperor officially acknowledged Christian III of Denmark the same year, but Frederick continued to press her claim. She attended the funeral of her sister's spouse, Francis of Lorraine, in Nancy. At Christmas of 1546 Frederick and Dorothea took communion in the Protestant way in Heidelberg, which provoked the Emperor's displeasure. For a while, Frederick took the side of the Protestant opposition. However, he soon rejoined the Emperor's Catholic cause. After this, Dorothea and Frederick prevented the introduction of Protestant Reformation. Dorothea held Lutheran sympathies her entire life. In 1551, Dorothea and Frederick made an official visit to Lorraine.

=== Later life ===
In 1556, Frederick died, nursed by Dorothea. She sent for his successor, Otto Henry, Elector Palatine. Otto Henry introduced the Protestant Reformation, which Dorothea supported. When she visited her sister in the Netherlands in 1557, it was said of her that she "is known to be a Lutheran and against the Emperor, and is as much hated here as her sister Christina is beloved." The former Emperor Charles V instructed his son Philip to invite Dorothea to stay in the Netherlands so that she might become Catholic again, and Christina also attempted to persuade her to do so, but Dorothea refused.

As a widow, she lived in retirement in the Palatine castle in Neuburg. There were considerations of marriage to a son of Philip of Hesse, or to Albert Alcibiades, Margrave of Brandenburg-Kulmbach, but none came to fruition, and the latter died in 1557. At the death of her father in prison in Denmark in 1559, Dorothea assumed the title of Queen of Denmark as his heir. She would need the help of her mother's dynasty, however, to press her claim, but the Habsburg dynasty showed no interest in helping her take the throne. The Danish loyalists, headed by Peder Oxe, therefore asked Christina to persuade Dorothea to surrender her claims to Christina and her son. In 1561, Christina visited Dorothea, and reportedly did so.

Dorothea died in 1580 and was buried in the Holy Ghost Church in Heidelberg.

== Ancestry ==
Ancestors of Dorothea of Denmark, Electress Palatine

8. Christian I of Denmark
4. John of Denmark
9. Dorothea of Brandenburg
2. Christian II of Denmark
10. Ernest, Elector of Saxony
5. Christina of Saxony
11. Elisabeth of Bavaria
1. Dorothea of Denmark
12. Maximilian I, Holy Roman Emperor
6. Philip I of Castile
13. Mary, Duchess of Burgundy
3. Isabella of Austria
14. Ferdinand II of Aragon
7. Joanna of Castile
15. Isabella I of Castile

Royal titles
Preceded by Sibylle of Bavaria	Electress Palatine; 1544–1556	Succeeded by Marie of Brandenburg-Kulmbach
