= Rebola, Bola =

1941 song by Carmen Miranda for the film Week-End in Havana

Song by Carmen Miranda
- Released: 1941
- Songwriters: Aloysio de Oliveira; Nestor Amaral; Brant Horta

Rebola, Bola is a song written by Aloysio de Oliveira, Nestor Amaral and Brant Horta, and recorded by Carmen Miranda in 1941 for the film Week-End in Havana, in which Miranda co-starred.

"Rebola, Bola" is considered to be representative of authentic Brazilian music. Miranda's permanent residency in the United States began in 1939. Without direct and enduring contact with Brazilian composers, she turned to cover versions of songs that had already been recorded by singers in Brazil. In 1941, the American representative of the Brazilian Society of Authors (SBAT) sought a larger share of the performance royalties for the music of Miranda and others, causing the music of SBAT composers to not be performed in the United States. This forced Miranda to rely on songs that came from the Brazilian SBAT catalog. As a result, "Rebola, Bola" is noted as one of the last original and authentic Brazilian exemplars in her performance history.
