= Pedro Rebolledo (composer) =

Panamanian composer and trumpeter

- Born: April 27, 1895; Panama City, Panama Department, Colombia (now in Panama)
- Died: October 3, 1963 (aged 68); David, Chiriquí, Panama
- Occupation: Composer

Pedro Rebolledo (April 27, 1895 in Panama City – October 3, 1963 in David, Chiriquí) was a Panamanian composer and sometime trumpeter. He studied with Julián Carrillo in Mexico before returning to Panama; among his compositions are a number of works for orchestra. He showed an early talent for the trumpet. He joined the symphony orchestra maestro Julian Carrillo, which toured the United States. Back in Panama Musical Union founded the union purposes and this entity was the initiator of the Second National Symphony Orchestra. He was Director of the Banda Republican, Professor of Harmony of the National Conservatory of Music and Declamation. His compositions are of the classical genre, among which are: "Clarinet Concerto", "Interioranos Rhapsody," "Symphony in F," and "Serenata Chiriqui."
