= Hof van Savoye =

16th-century building in Mechelen, Belgium

Court of Savoye
- Hof van Savoye
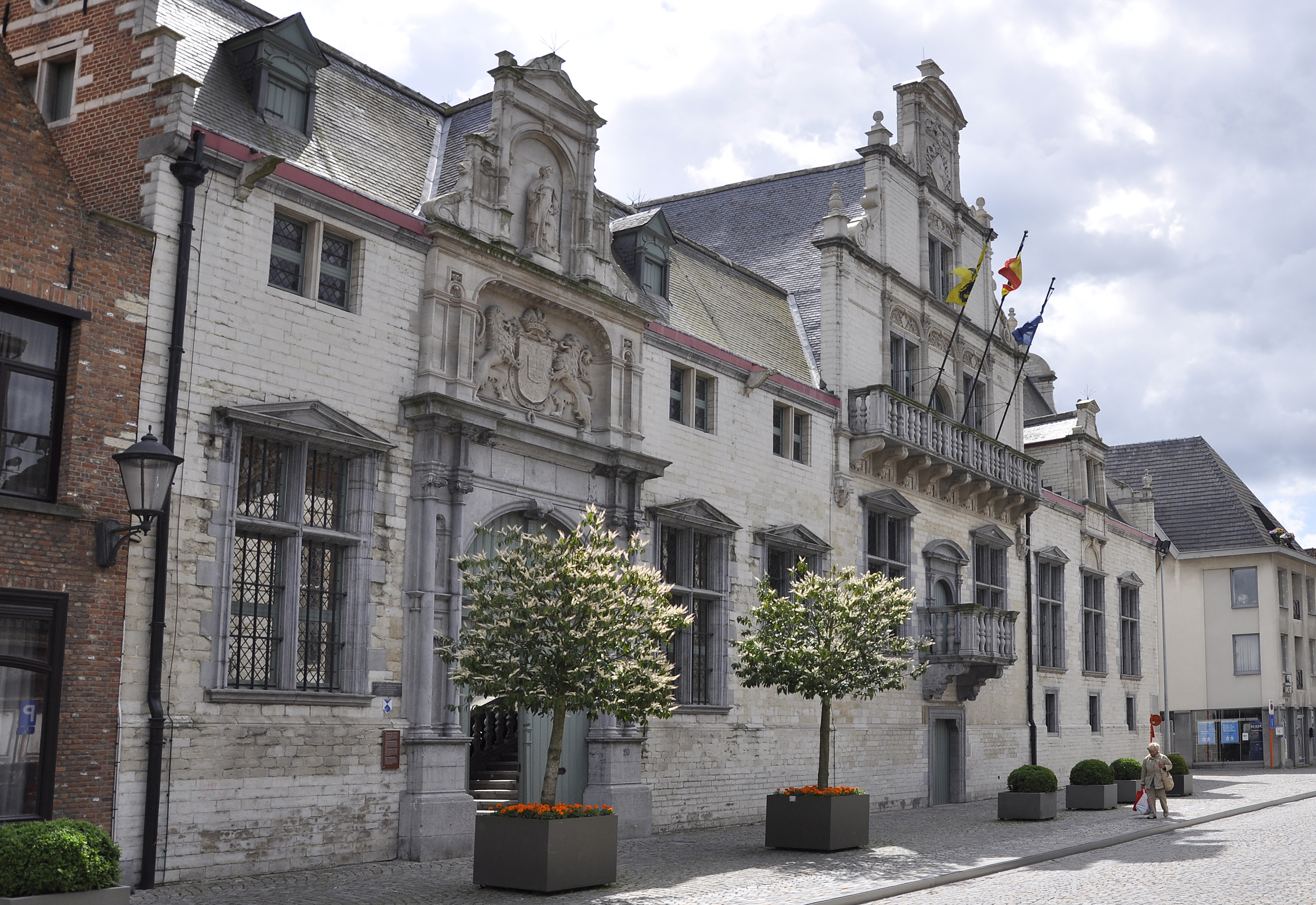
- Court of Savoye

General information
- Location: Mechelen, Belgium
- Coordinates: 51°1′43″N 4°29′10.7″E

Design and construction
- Architect(s): Rombout II Keldermans; Antoon I Keldermans

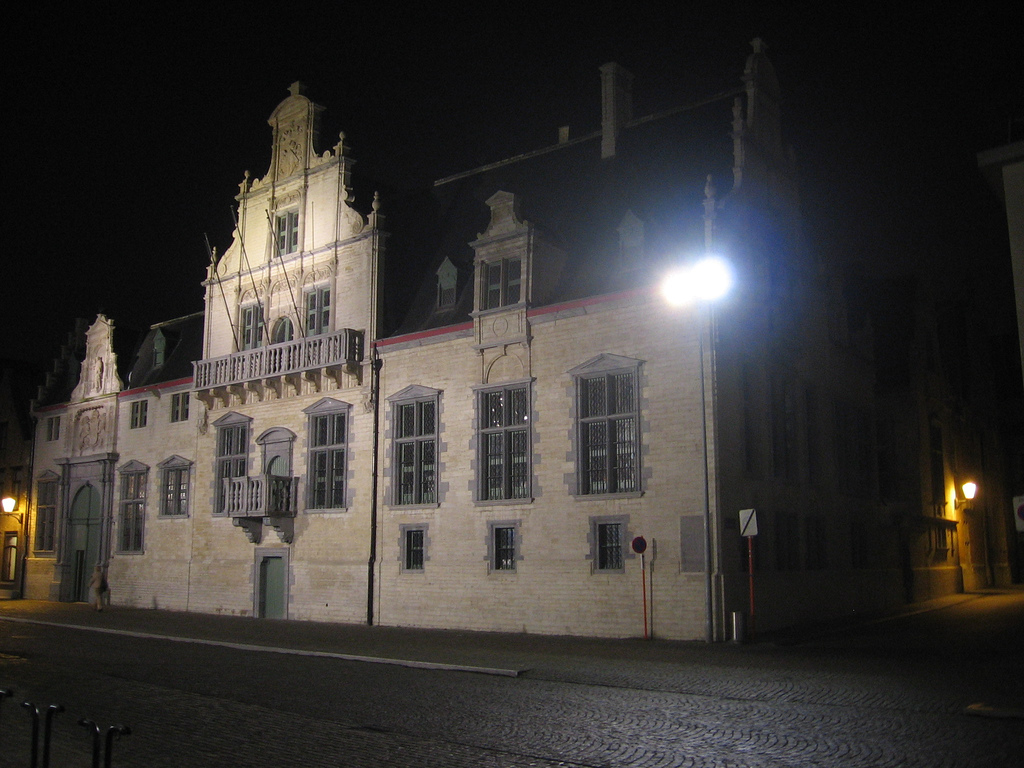
Court of Savoy, rear façade on Keizerstraat and (here darker) side at Korte Maagdenstraat

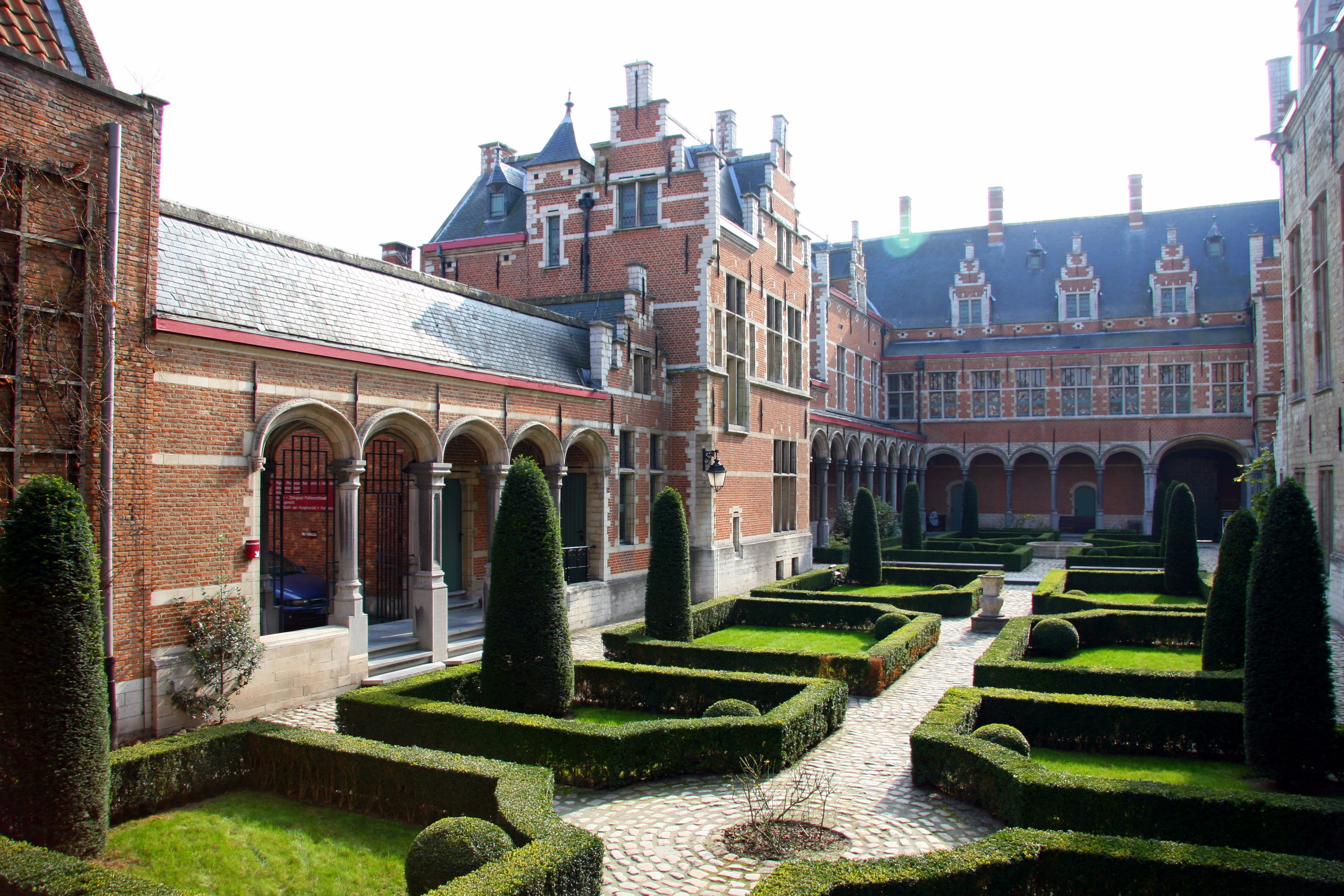
Inner courtyard of Margaret of Austria's Palace

The Hof van Savoye (Court of Savoy) or Palace of Margaret of Austria is an early 16th-century building in Mechelen, Belgium. It was one of the first Renaissance buildings in Northern Europe.

Margaret of Austria, Duchess of Savoy, Governor of the Netherlands, was granted a house located in the Korte Maagdenstraat (Virgins Short Street), (Note: It is not uncommon for Dutch language street names to distinct a shorter from a longer stretch. Less usual, the short Korte Maagdenstraat held its name when the corresponding name for a longer street was abandoned.) but she found it too small and started an ambitious expansion campaign in 1507. From 1517 to 1530 the architect Rombout II Keldermans furthered the project, along the Keizerstraat (Emperor Street) modifying what became the rear wing, which faces the Palace of Margaret of York, her step grandmother who had died in 1503. Margaret raised her nephew Charles, the later Holy Roman Emperor, in her palace, at which she lived until her death in 1530.

Historian Eric Ives describes the inner courtyard and southern wing of the palace, still much like Anne Boleyn must have seen it during the stage of her upbringing at Margaret's court. It stood a model for the Palace of Whitehall as rebuilt for Anne in the 1530s. (Note: Ives holds Anne's uncertain birth year at about 1501, in which case Anne had nearly Charles' age and young teenagers lived at the Hof van Savoye. If she was born approximately 6 years later, around 1507, she would have stayed at the Palace of (the late) Margaret of York across the street that already referred to an emperor long before Charles came to that title.)

In 1546 the explosion of the city gate that held the gunpowder stock, the Zandpoort (Sand Gate), brought repairable damage to the palace. It was owned by the city until 1561. That year, it received a new calling as the residence of Granvelle, the first Archbishop of Mechelen, and right-hand man of Philip II.

In 1609 the building was bought back by the city and served as the headquarters of the Great Council of the Netherlands from 1616 until 1795.

The Hof van Savoye became known as the Gerechtshof (Court of Justice), because it houses the lower courts (Criminal and Civil Court, Justice of the Peace, and Police Court).

== See also ==
- List of castles in Belgium
