= Ebba Eriksdotter Vasa =

Swedish noblewoman (1490s–1549)

- Born: c. 1491
- Died: 21 November 1549; Vreta Abbey
- Noble family: House of Vasa
- Spouse: Erik Abrahamsson Leijonhufvud
- Issue: Abraham Leijonhufvud; Birgitta "Brita" Leijonhufvud; Margaret Leijonhufvud; Anna Leijonhufvud; Sten Leijonhufvud; Martha Leijonhufvud
- Father: Erik Karlsson Vasa
- Mother: Anna Karlsdotter (Vinstorpa)

Ebba Eriksdotter Vasa (c. 1491 – 21 November 1549) was a Swedish noblewoman. She was the mother of Queen Margaret Leijonhufvud and the second cousin and mother-in-law of King Gustav Vasa.

== Life ==
Ebba was the daughter of the nobles riksråd Erik Karlsson Vasa (1436–1491) and Anna Karlsdotter (Vinstorpa). Her father was a cousin of Erik Johansson Vasa, father of King Gustav Vasa, and she was thus the second cousin of the future king. She married riksråd Erik Abrahamsson Leijonhufvud on 18 January 1512 in Söderköping. She was, as other women of her position in contemporary Sweden, referred to as Fru Ebba ('Lady Ebba').

=== Widowhood ===
In 1520, her spouse was executed during the Stockholm Bloodbath. During the bloodbath, Ebba and her children were guests in Västerås Abbey, where they had been lodged by her spouse for their safety when he departed for the coronation of Christian I in Stockholm. She and her children, therefore, avoided being taken to Denmark as hostages as the other women and children related to the executed of the bloodbath, such as Christina Gyllenstierna, Cecilia Månsdotter and Margareta Eriksdotter Vasa. Ebba was allowed to keep the family estates despite the execution of her spouse for heresy, likely because of the unstable political situation. She mainly resided at Lo Castle in Västergötland.

In 1523, her second cousin Gustav I became king of Sweden. She was granted certain privileges by him, such as the right to keep certain fines of the crown, and as a widow and head of her family, she performed the same duties as any noble vassal and equipped knights for the king's army. In 1525, her sister and brother-in-law Margareta von Melen and Berend von Melen became involved in the suspected attempt of Christina Gyllenstierna and Søren Norby to conquer the throne, and as a reward for her loyalty, lady Ebba was granted the confiscated property of her exiled sister in Sweden. As the king's second cousin, she likely belonged to those "highest lords and ladies of the realm" summoned to escort the new queen, Catherine of Saxe-Lauenburg to Sweden and attend the wedding of the king, during which her daughter Brita was married to the kings favored courtier Gustaf Olofsson till Torpa.

=== Court life ===
In October 1536, the king married her daughter Margaret, making her mother-in-law to her second cousin the king, who addressed her as "Dearest Mother" and seem to have had a good relationship with her. As the in-laws of the monarch, she and her children often attended court and was given favored roles to play in ceremonial court life. At the baptism of her granddaughter princess Cecilia in 1540, for example, she participated in the procession directly after her daughter the queen, who was escorted by her eldest son Abraham and the king, while she herself was escorted by two male members of the aristocracy.

Her son's were given offices, and she and her mother were granted land and several privileges, such as the right to some of the royal taxes from their tenants and the support of the king in most of their many court cases regarding land rights, and the right granted after the Swedish Reformation to retract land donated to the church by their ancestors in accordance with the Reduction of Gustav I of Sweden.

Reportedly, Ebba had a great deal of influence at court during the first years of her daughter's tenure as queen and did not hesitate to ask her son-in-law for favors: in February 1537, for example, the king issued a pardon in a court case "after the many prayers of our hearths dearest wife and her dearest mother". She was also issued assignments from the king, such as to examine whether the complaints of the governor of Alvastar was correct, and when he, during the Dacke War, asked her to prevent any abuse of the overseers of her son Sten (at that point his envoy in France) of the peasantry, so as not to provoke them to join the rebellion.

It is unknown whether she was ever given a court office, as the court staff from this period is only fragmentary known, but according to the list describing who occupied which room in the royal castles, Ebba was, alongside Christina Gyllenstierna, one of two women often given the best rooms closest to the queen when attending court. During the royal couple's trips around the country, Ebba and Christina Gyllenstierna, was on several occasions given the responsibility for the royal children, such as for example in 1540, when they were left in her care in Örebro Castle, while the king and queen visited Älvsborg. The royal children were regardless always in the care of their personal staff the cunning woman Brigitta Lars Anderssons, lady Margareta and Ingrid Amundsdotter.

Ebba was a stern Catholic, and in 1536 the king gave her Vreta Abbey in Östergötland, which was given her protection during the Swedish Reformation. Eventually, Ebba retired to Vreta Abbey, where she died of the plague in 1549.

Issue

1. Abraham Eriksson Leijonhufvud (1512–1556), riksråd
2. Birgitta "Brita" Eriksdotter Leijonhufvud (1514–1572), mother of Queen Catherine Stenbock.
3. Margaret Leijonhufvud (1516–1551), Queen
4. Anna Leijonhufvud (1517–1540)
5. Sten Eriksson Leijonhufvud (1518–1568), chamberlain
6. Martha Leijonhufvud (1520–1584), known as "King Martha"
