= Margareta von Melen =

Swedish noblewoman (c. 1489–1541)

Margareta von Melen née Vasa (circa. 1489–November 22, 1541) was a Swedish noble. She was second cousin of King Gustav Vasa and the maternal aunt of Queen Margaret Leijonhufvud .

== Life ==
Margareta was the eldest daughter of the nobles Erik Karlsson (Vasa) and Anna Karlsdotter (Vinstorpa). Her father was a cousin of Erik Johansson Vasa, father of King Gustav Vasa, and she was thus the second cousin of the future king.

Margareta married at some point prior to 1515 to lord Erik Knutsson Tre Rosor. In November 1520, her spouse became one of those executed at the Stockholm Bloodbath.

=== Cousin of the king ===
In 1523, she married the German noble and riksråd Berend von Melen in Söderköping. The marriage was arranged by her second cousin the king for political reasons. During his early reign, the German nobles John VII of Hoya and Berend von Melen belonged to the most trusted allies of the king, and he arranged the marriage between John VII of Hoya and his sister Margareta and Berend von Melen and his second cousin Margareta to secure their loyalty: the marriages were however controversial among the peasantry, who disliked the Germans around the king and criticized them and the foreign marriages when the king married the German princess Catherine of Saxe-Lauenburg. After their marriage, king Gustav granted the governorship of Vyborg Castle (an important stronghold against Russia) to John VII of Hoya and Kalmar Castle (an important stronghold against Denmark) to Berend von Melen.

=== Treason ===
Two years later, Margareta and her spouse took part in the failed attempt of Christina Gyllenstierna and Søren Norby to take the throne. In March 1525, the first of the Dalecarlian rebellions took place organized by Knut Mickelsson and Christina's former chancellor Peder Jakobsson (Sunnanväder), who glorified the reign of the Sture family in contrast to that of Gustav Vasa. The rebels reportedly contacted Søren Norby, who was the same month promised by Christian II to be his governor in Sweden should he deposed king Gustav. In April, Norby was rumored to be on his way to Blekinge with a fleet, after which he launched attacks with his fleet from his base in Gotland.

King Gustav sent Berend von Melen to fight Norby. However, von Melen broke his loyalty to the king and allied with Søren Norby, a treason for which the king blamed his second cousin Margareta von Melen: "Whatever wind in his ear it was [that made him shift loyalty] is not to be said. Although some blamed this on his wife, as this took place immediately after she joined him there." Shortly after, Christina sent her son Nils to von Melen at Kalmar Castle, and it was evidently believed, that von Melen would help Nils to unite with Norby. It was speculated abroad, that Søren Norby and Berend von Melen would conquer Sweden together as they were "through their wives highly connected" in Sweden.

At this point, the von Melen couple left for Germany, leaving Nils and a garrison in Kalmar, which was sieged by the troops of Gustav I, while Christina herself seems to have been placed in arrest. In May, the Dalecarlian rebels reproached King Gustav for having imprisoned Christina and having driven her son Nils out of the country and demanded the freedom of Christina.

On 20 July 1525, however, the rebellion was crushed when Nils, the son of Christina, was taken prisoner by king Gustav after his victory at the Siege of Kalmar.

=== Exile ===
Margareta von Melen settled in Saxony, where her spouse was given a position by the Prince Elector and printed libelous pamphlets about King Gustav that damaged his reputation in Germany. Her property in Sweden was confiscated and given to her younger sister Ebba Eriksdotter Vasa: Margareta protested the confiscation and demanded her sister pay compensation, but Lady Ebba refused on the grounds that she had not asked for them and was supported by the king, who declared that Margareta and her spouse had done their best to harm the king and the realm and that Lady Margareta had abandoned her country and "so deviously used her mouth in a way too shameful to mention."

Margareta died in exile in Germany.
