= Sko Abbey =

Former Swedish Cistercian nunnery

Coordinates: 59°42′14″N 17°37′10″E

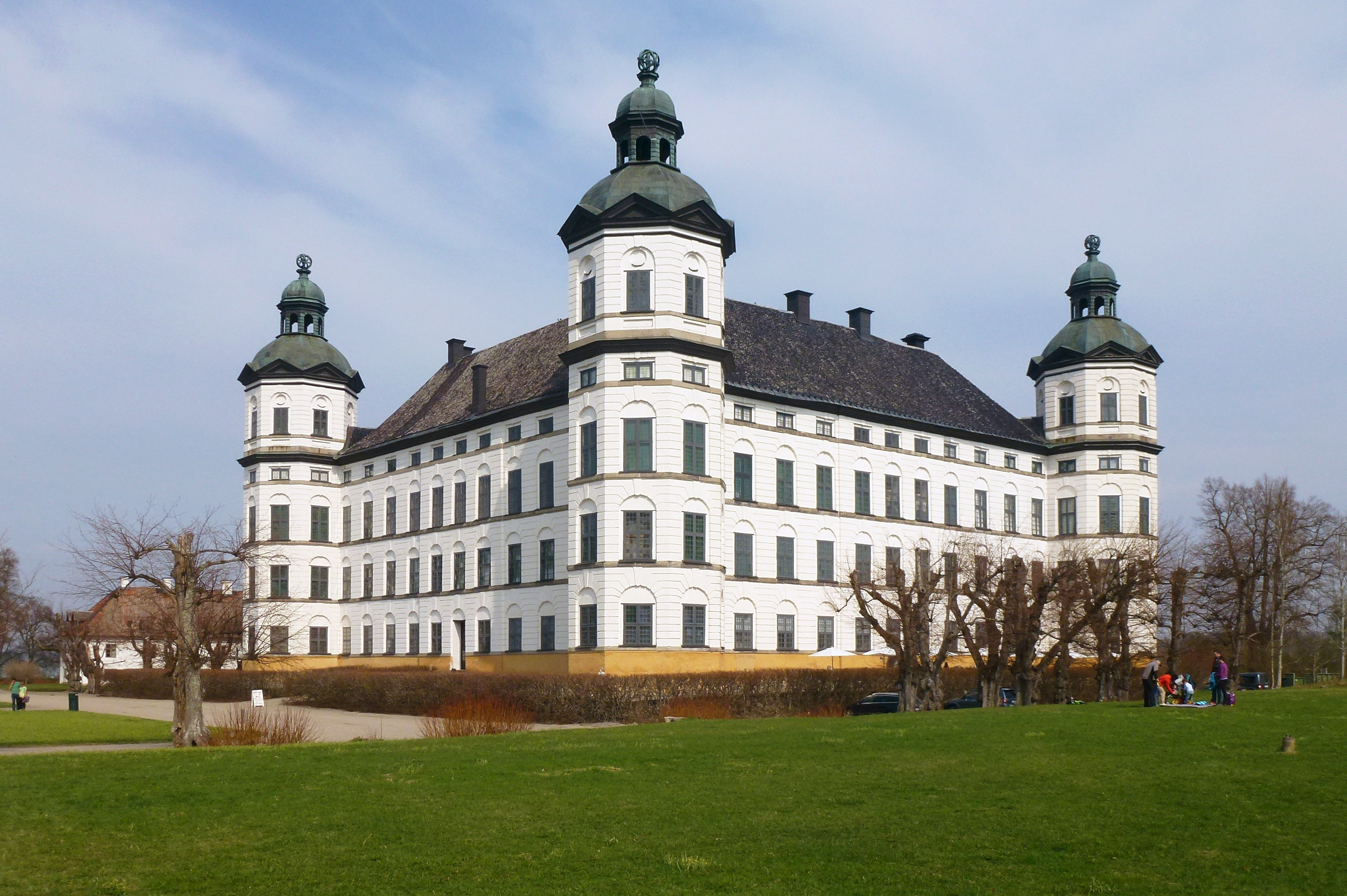
Skokloster Castle

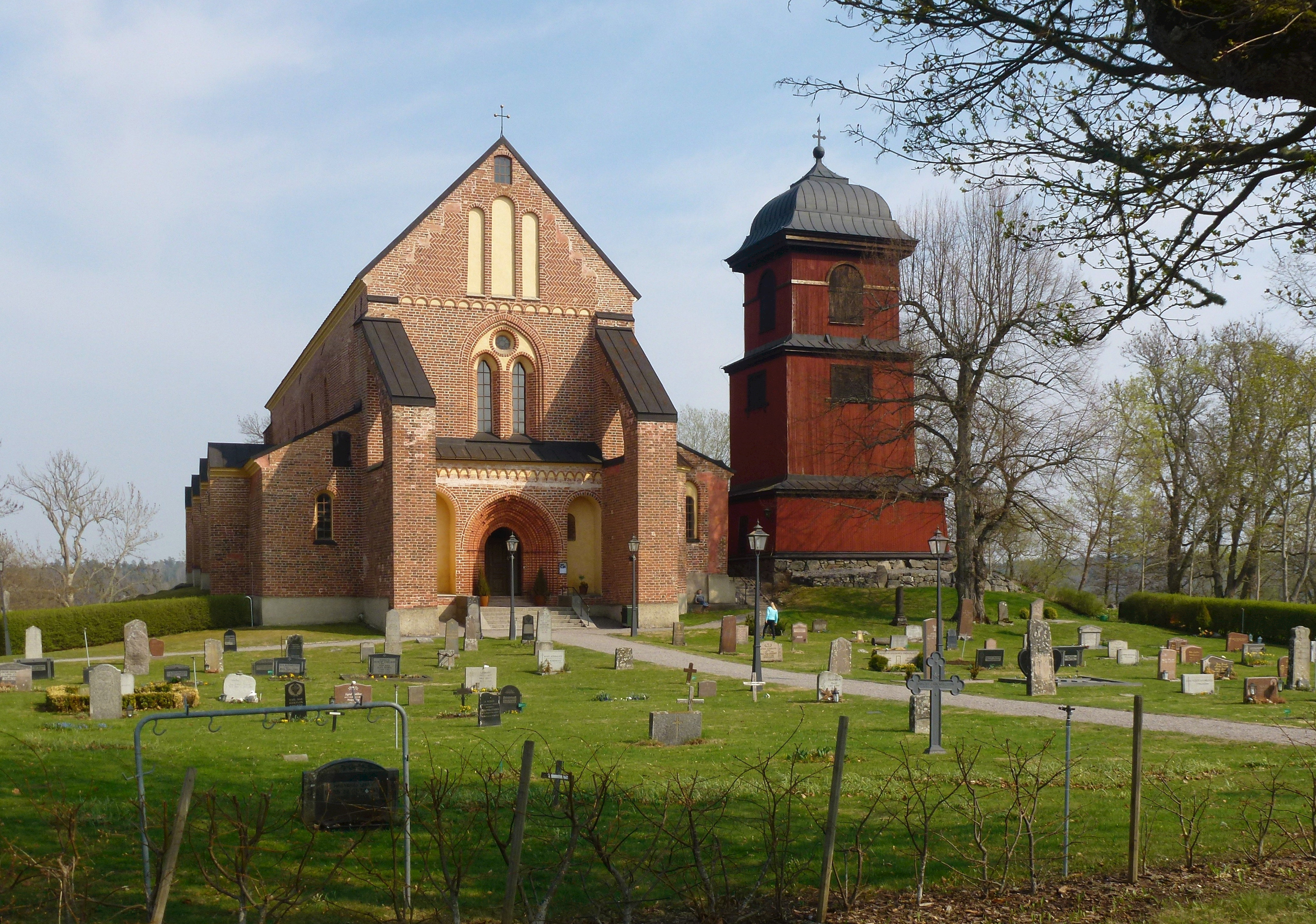
Skoklosters Church

Sko Abbey (Swedish: Sko kloster), was a Cistercian nunnery in Sweden, in operation from 1230 until at least 1588. It was located in the Skokloster parish in Uppland. It was the predecessor of the baroque Skokloster Castle.

== History ==
Sko monastery was founded around 1230 by Knut Långe. Byarums monastery was relocated to Sko in 1236. Sko Abbey was founded because an already existing convent, Byarum Abbey, which was founded in about 1170, was moved from Vaggeryd Municipality to Sko in the 1230s.

Sko Abbey seem to have functioned as a school for daughters of the nobility, and the nuns often came from noble families. In 1520, the sister of Gustav I of Sweden, Margareta Eriksdotter Vasa, was given refuge there during the Stockholm Bloodbath.

=== Dissolution ===
During the Swedish Reformation in 1527, the Abbey was banned from accepting novices and its assets was confiscated by the crown in accordance with the Reduction of Gustav I of Sweden. The members were free to leave or to remain supported by an allowance from the estates formerly belonging to the Abbey. In 1566, these rights were confirmed, at which point the nuns were apparently still managing their school for daughters of the nobility. In 1577, only two nuns remained, and the last allowance to a nun of the Sko Abbey is recorded from 1588. After the Reformation, the monastery seems to have functioned as a girls' school and as a retirement home for older women.

=== Post dissolution ===
The building of the abbey itself was torn down in 1574. In the early 1600s, King Charles IX donated the property to the then 27-year-old Herman Wrangel as a reward for services rendered. His son Carl Gustaf Wrangel had Skokloster Castle built on the site in 1654–1676. Skokloster Church (Skoklosters kyrka) is used as the church of Skokloster Castle.

== Abbesses ==
The abbesses are only partially known.

- R(ichissa) (1254)
- Elin (1277)
- Ramborg (1296)
- Helga (1321)
- Katarina (1326)
- Vendilgerd (1352)
- Leva (1398)
- Alzeka Hennikadotter (1407)
- Elisabet (1412)
- Kristina Jonsdotter (1413)
- Ragnhild (1423)
- Katarina Jönsdotter (1410-1452)
- Elin Filipsdotter (1457)
- Brigitta Olofsdotter (1464)
- Barbara Ludvigsdotter (1489)
- Elin Petri (1503)
- Katarina Jönsdotter (1509)
- Ingeborg (1513)
- Katarina Jönsdotter (1516)
- Katarina Olofsdotter (1521)
- Ingegärd Hansadotter (1534)
- Benedicta (Bengta) Eriksdotter (1553)
