= Margareta Eriksdotter =

Margareta Eriksdotter may refer to:

- Margaret of Sweden, Queen of Norway (c. 1155–1209)
- Margaret Leijonhufvud (1516–1551)
- Margareta Eriksdotter Vasa (1497 – 1536), Swedish noblewoman, sister of Gustav Vasa
