= Christina Gyllenstierna =

Swedish noblewoman (1494–1559)

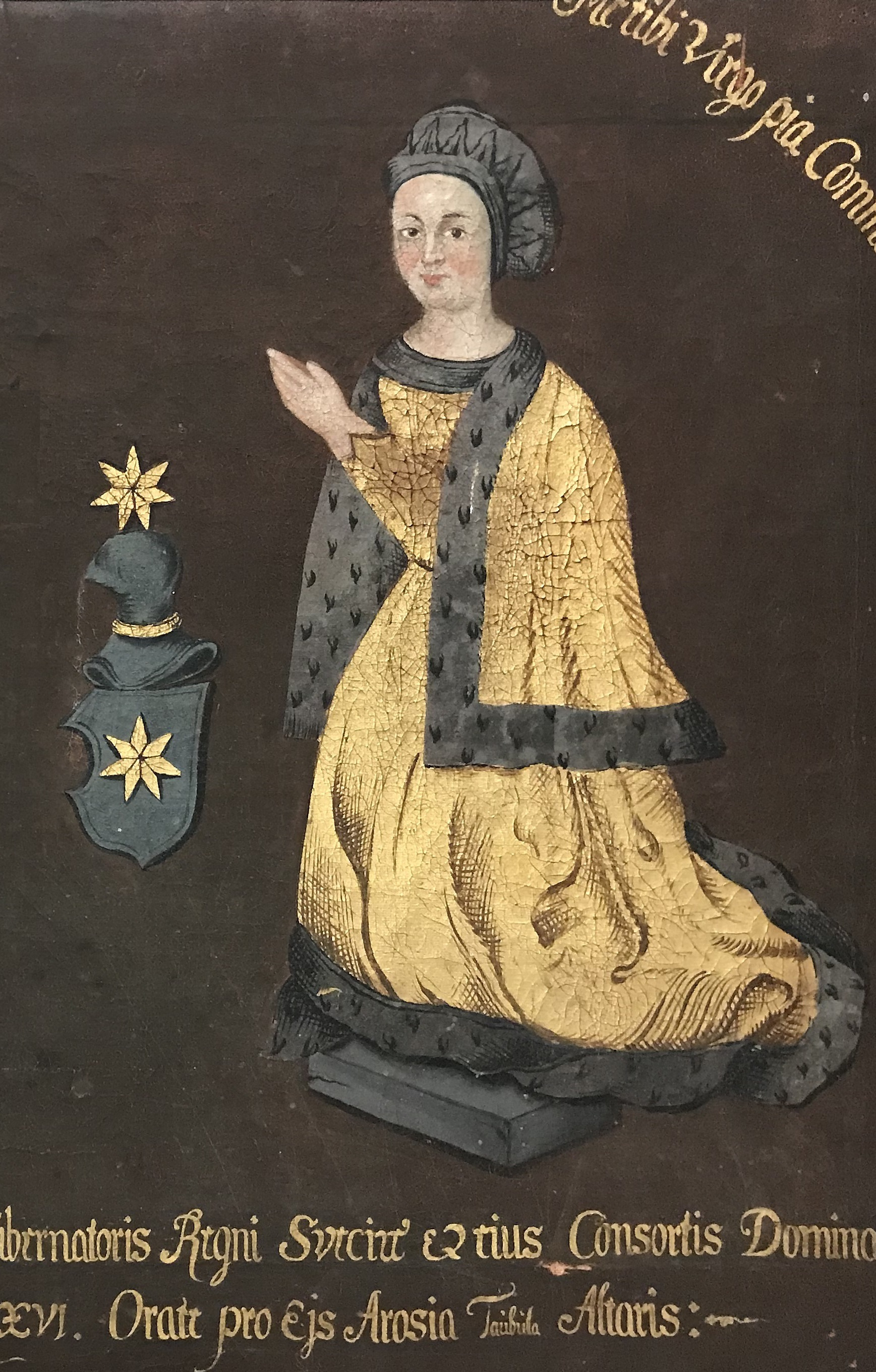
- Christina Gyllenstierna
- Born: 1494
- Died: January 1559 (aged 64–65); Hörningsholm Castle
- Noble family: Gyldenstierne
- Spouse: Sten Sture the Younger
- Issue: 6, including Svante Stensson Sture
- Father: Nils Eriksson Gyllenstierna
- Mother: Sigrid Eskilsdotter (Banér)

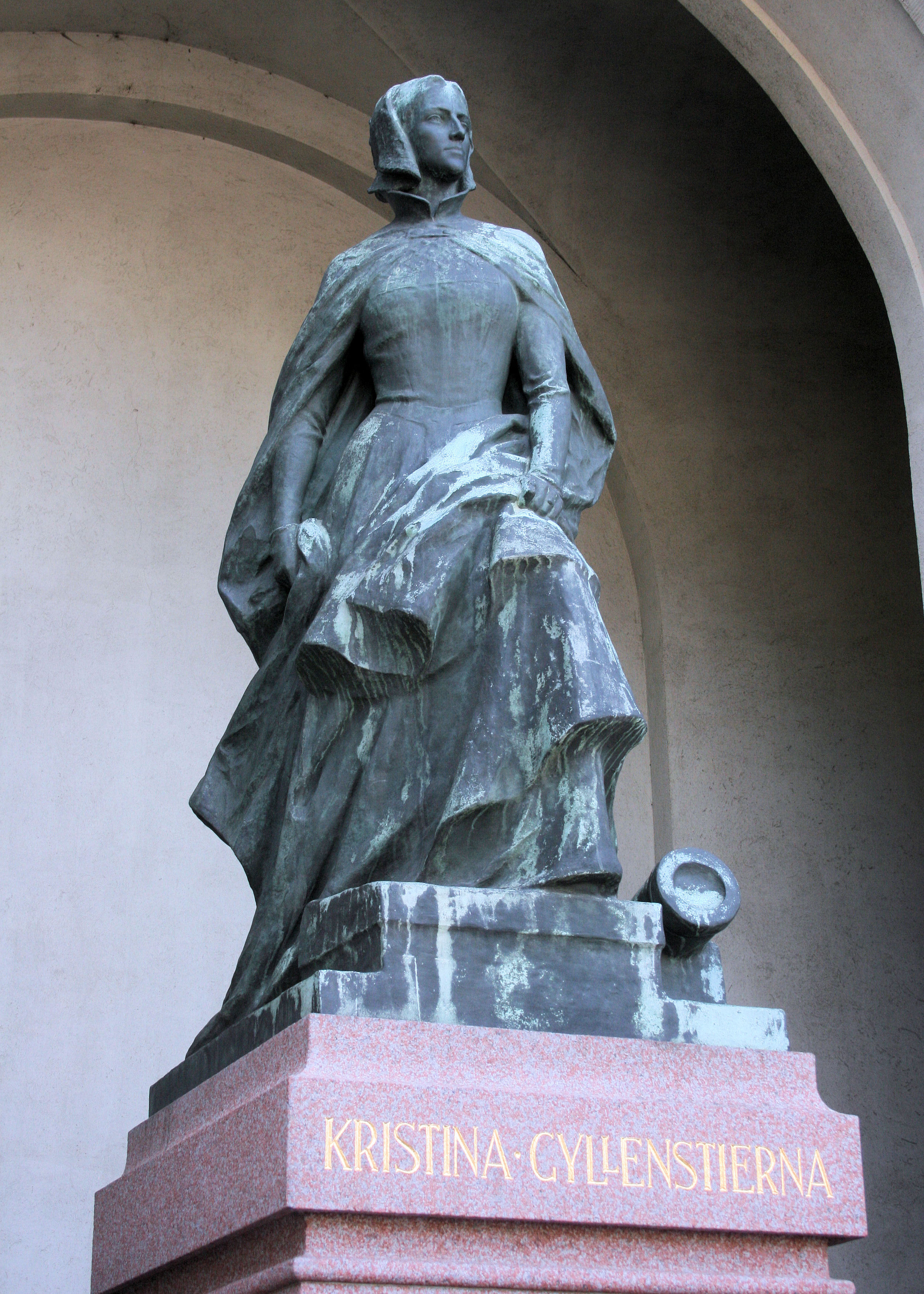
Modern Statue of Christina Gyllenstierna at Stockholm Palace as defender of the city

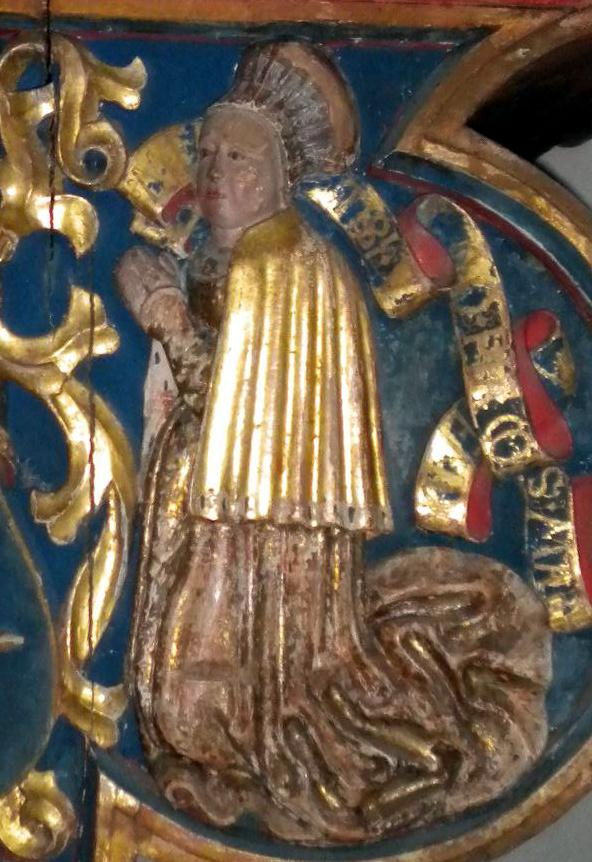
16th century sculpture by the altar of Västerås Cathedral

Christina Nilsdotter Gyllenstierna of Fogelvik (Swedish: Kristina or Kerstin: 1494 – January 1559) was a Swedish noblewoman. She was married to the Swedish regent Sten Sture the Younger and led the Swedish resistance against Christian II of Denmark after the death of her spouse. In her own lifetime, she was simply referred to as Fru Kristina ('Lady Christina'), but she has become known in history as Kristina Gyllenstierna because of the noble family to which she belonged.

== Early life ==
Christina Gyllenstierna was born to riksråd Nils Eriksson (Gyllenstierna), Lord of Tullgarn (also written with the Danish spelling Niels Eriksen, and surnamed "Gyllenstjerna" by later historians) and Sigrid Eskilsdotter (Banér) of Venngarn, Heir of Lindholm. She was a great-granddaughter of King Charles VIII of Sweden through her paternal grandmother princess Christina Karlsdotter Bonde (1432–1493/1500), heir of Fogelvik, after whom she was named. Her grandfather Erik Eriksen of Demstrup ("Gyldenstjerne") originated from Denmark, but during the power struggle between Denmark and Sweden, two formally united parts of the Kalmar Union, he allied with the Swedish claimant, Charles VIII, who made him his son-in-law and High Steward of Charles' court. By the first marriage of her mother, Christina was the half-sister of Cecilia Månsdotter of Eka and thereby the maternal aunt of the future king Gustav I.

Christina was first engaged to Nils Gädda (d. 1508), governor of Kalmar and Lycka, but the marriage never took place due to his death. On 16 November 1511 in Stockholm, she married the son of the Swedish regent Svante and the nephew of her former betrothed, Sten Sture the Younger. She had six children during her marriage, but only one of them survived to mature adulthood:

- Nils (1512–1527 or 1528), died in adolescence
- Iliana (1514–1521), died in early childhood
- Magdalena (1516–1521), died in early childhood
- Svante Stensson Sture (1517–1567)
- Anna (1518–1521), died in early childhood
- Gustav (1519–1520), died in early childhood

== Reign of Sten Sture ==
In 1512, Sten Sture succeeded his father as elected regent of Sweden upon his death. During this period, Denmark, Norway and Sweden were formally part of the Kalmar Union through a personal union under the King of Denmark, but in reality, Sweden had been a de facto independent kingdom under "regents" (Sw. riksföreståndare) native high nobles elected to rule the country.

Sten Sture's election as regent was not without opposition. At the death of his father, Sten was only 18 years old, and High Councillor Eric Trolle, who supported the union with Denmark, was initially chosen as regent by the council. However, Sten utilized the castles and troops granted to him by his late father and took power in a coup: after having promised to continue negotiations with Denmark, the High Council accepted him as regent instead of Trolle. In reality, Lord Sten's purpose was to keep Sweden independent from Denmark. He took the Sture name, a heritage from his great-grandmother, because it symbolized the independence of Sweden as a reminder of Sten Sture the Elder, his father's third cousin.

Regent Sten had already in 1504 been proposed as a candidate in the election of a new king of Sweden as a replacement for John, King of Denmark, who had been elected King of Sweden in 1497 but who was ousted from there in 1502. Upon the death of John in 1513, it was again proposed to elect regent Sten as King of Sweden rather than the son of John, Christian II of Denmark, and Sten was making preparations to arrange an election, including seeking support for it from the pope.

It is considered likely that Christina participated in state affairs and acted as the political adviser to her spouse, given her later role. In reality, Sten and Christina already functioned as king and queen of Sweden: by 1519, Peder Månsson, Bishop of Västerås, expressed his surprise in a letter from Rome to Abbess Anna Germundsdotter of Vadstena Abbey that Sten had not yet been crowned, and in the contemporary Stockholm chronicle, Christina is referred to as "Our Gracious Princess." By their ambitions, they became the natural enemies of King Christian II of Denmark, whose ambition it was to be elected king of Sweden and thereby again make Sweden a part of the Kalmar Union in practice and not only in name.

Sten became involved in a conflict with archbishop Gustav Trolle, son of his previous rival Eric Trolle. The archbishop claimed more autonomy for the church. In 1516, Sten besieged Staket, the fortress of archbishop Trolle, and when Staket was taken the following year, Sten had the fortress dismantled, Trolle taken captive, imprisoned and deposed as archbishop. The deposition of an archbishop resulted in the excommunication of Sten Sture by the pope, who gave Christian II support in his designs against Sten Sture. On the New Year of 1520, Christian II invaded Sweden.

== Defender of Stockholm ==
On 19 January 1520, Regent Sten was mortally wounded at the battle of Bogesund. Lady Christina emerged as the leader of the Sture party and defender of her son's right. She took command of the city and Castle of Stockholm in the name of her underage son, and secured support from the majority of the peasantry and burgher class. The commanders of the most important fortresses of the realm pledged their loyalty to her. These were the Västerås Castle, Nyköping Castle, Kalmar Castle as well as the province of Finland. However, she did not manage to secure enough support from the nobility: "Some stated their will to fight for the children of Lord Sten, while one party gave a stern now to Lady Christina the widow of Lord Sten, with the city of Stockholm and those of her followers, and often wrote to them that they should unite and resist the enemy, although such letters were not considered." On 6 March 1520, several members of the Privy Council of Sweden submitted to Christian II, electing him king of Sweden in Uppsala. The peasantry of central Sweden roused by her patriotism, flew to arms and defeated the Danish invaders at Balundsås on 19 March and were only with the utmost difficulty finally defeated at the bloody battle of Uppsala, on 6 April.

In late May, the Danish fleet arrived and the city of Stockholm was besieged by land and sea by the Danes under Christian II. Shortly before, Christina managed to send her eldest son, the seven year old Nils Stensson Sture to safety in Danzig in Poland with an envoy headed by the chancellor of the Sture family, Peder Jakobsson (Sunnanväder). This was done to issue negotiations with Sigismund I the Old and the Hanseatic League for support against Denmark. In her embassy to Danzig, she stated that she governed the realm until her sons had reached the age of majority and could take over the regency. She had the support from the burghers of Stockholm, who referred to her as their Princess. Lady Christina took command and held out stoutly at Stockholm, while the second stronghold of Sweden, Kalmar, was commanded and defended and by the widow of its governor, Anna Eriksdotter (Bielke), in the same fashion.

On 7 September 1520, after four months of siege, Christina was persuaded to capitulate in exchange for a letter of amnesty. In the letter of amnesty issued by Christian II, an amnesty of the most explicit and absolute character was extracted for Christina herself, her dead spouse and all their followers for all acts of resistance against Christian II himself, his father King John and his grandfather Christian I before him, regardless of all acts against bishop Trolle. Personally, Christina was granted Häme Castle and county, Kuhmo state in Finland, Hörningsholm Castle in Södermanland and Eksjö estate in Småland.

== Stockholm Bloodbath ==
On 1 November Christian II was proclaimed King Christian I of Sweden, followed by his coronation in Storkyrkan by the reinstated archbishop Gustav Trolle on 4 September. The coronation was followed by three days of festivities attended by the Swedish nobility, during which he danced with Christina on a ball.

On 7 November, King Christian summoned the Swedish nobility to a meeting in the throne hall at Stockholm Castle. When the meeting was opened, the doors were closed and guarded, and archbishop Trolle accused her, her mother, her late spouse and the followers of Sture for his deposition and demanded compensation and punishment. Lady Christina stepped forward and pointed out the fact that the deposition of bishop Trolle had been a decision taken by a united parliament: everyone had signed the bill of deposition, placing the responsibility on the entire realm and making it impossible to accuse and punish a particular individual for the act. Furthermore, the amnesty granted by the king as a term for her surrender made it impossible for the king to punish them for their actions against him and his followers.

She stated that there was proof as the protocol from the meeting of 1517, when the removal of Trolle was decided upon, was there: the document with signatures was then presented to the king. Because of the amnesty, the Swedes now considered the matter solved. However, Christian had found a loophole, which the Swedes had overlooked. Previously advised by Didrik Slagheck and Jens Andersen Beldenak not to keep his word to heretics, he stated that the deposition of an archbishop was a crime against the church, and that a monarch had no jurisdiction to pardon anyone for heresy. In effect, this meant that the king could in fact execute the participators in the rebellion against him despite the amnesty, by having them judged by the church for heresy rather than accused of treason by a secular court. This resulted in the infamous Stockholm Bloodbath upon the followers of Sten Sture.

Christina's brothers Erik Nilsson, Lord of Tullgarn and Eskil Nilsson, her maternal uncle and her brother-in-law were executed by beheading, as were many other Swedish Sture party followers. Her husband's remains were exhumed and burned publicly at the stake as a heretic, as were those of her youngest son Gustav. Her mother Sigrid became the only woman sentenced to be executed: she was sentenced to be drowned, but avoided execution by ceding her property to the king. Christina herself was not executed. King Christian called upon her and asked her to choose which method of execution she preferred, being burned at the stake or being buried alive. Confronted with this choice, she was unable to reply and fainted with horror. Christian was advised to spare her life and neither of these alternatives was carried out. To save her life, she ceded a large part of her property to Christian. The king stated that she "is now dead to the world, for she is judged as the others for heresy".

However, Danish rule in Sweden was threatened by her nephew Gustav Vasa, who soon became the leader of the Swedish War of Liberation. In the spring of 1521, Christina and her half-sister Cecilia (Gustav's mother) were forced to write to Gustav Vasa in an attempt to persuade him to surrender to Denmark.

== Denmark ==
Christina was held captive at Stockholm Castle until August 1521, after which her children, mother, and finally herself were all transferred to the infamous Blåtårn ("Blue Tower") of Copenhagen Castle along with a large number of other women and children related to the executed of the Stockholm Bloodbath, among them her half sister Cecilia and nieces Emerentia and Margareta. Christina herself and her daughters joined them there in September.

In the chronicle of Per Brahe the Elder, the captivity of the Swedish noblewomen in Denmark were described: "They were much deprived of food and drink [...]. Hardly given enough each day to keep their lives but they worked to be fed": King Gustav I of Sweden used their treatment in captivity in his propaganda against Christian II and claimed that the Danish monarch starved the women and children who only survived by the mercy showed them by the queen of Denmark, Isabella of Austria. Whatever the truth of this, it is confirmed that many of the imprisoned women and children died, among them Christina's daughter Magdalena, half sister Cecilia and niece Emerentia, though the cause of death are given as the plague, at that point used to classify a number of different illnesses. However, one source claims that Christina, in contrast to the other hostages, were not kept prisoner at Blue Tower but in Kalundborg, where she is confirmed to have been at least when the Swedish king later negotiated for her release.

After about two years imprisonment, the political situation changed. In January 1523 Christian II was deposed by Frederick I of Denmark and Christina's nephew Gustav I of Sweden took Stockholm from the Danes as the leader of the Swedish War of Liberation and was elected king of an independent kingdom of Sweden. In the summer of 1523, King Gustav applied for her release to Frederick I through the Hanseatic League. At that point, Christina reconciled with bishop Gustav Trolle in Roskilde.

== Power struggle with Gustav I ==
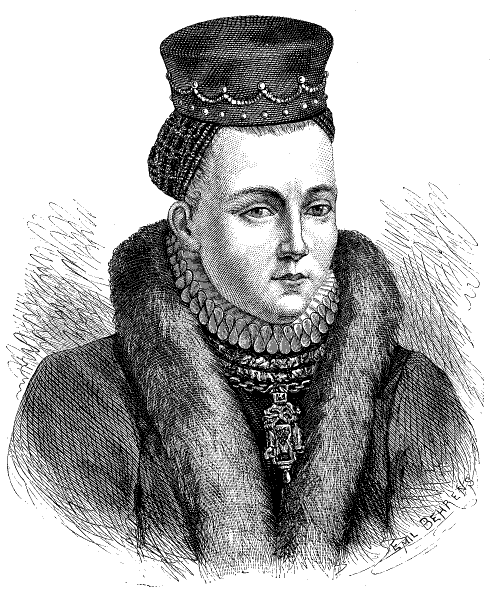
A 19th-century drawing of Gyllenstierna, known from a popular Swedish magazine published around 1880, though not an authentic likeness of her

In January 1524 Frederick I of Denmark agreed to release the Swedish noblewomen imprisoned at Blue Tower. Christina Gyllenstierna was released and is confirmed to have been in Sweden on 28 January that year: she returned in the company of her mother and her eldest son Nils, while her younger son Svante remained in Denmark to finish his education. On a meeting in Linköping, she reconciled with her former political advisory, bishop Hans Brask.

In summer 1524, King Gustav was informed by the mayor of Rostock and the Danish council that Christina planned to marry Søren Norby, Grand Admiral of Denmark and a follower of the deposed Danish king Christian II, in exchange for Norby using his fleet and military knowledge to help her conquer the Swedish throne for her son. These plans were regarded as a threat both by the new Danish monarch, Frederick I, as well as by King Gustav, and Gustav suspected that she had been led to believe that "she and her children would come to govern the realm" by the help of such a marriage, and that "Lady Christina and her party and followers who attempt to reward, with such evil plots and treason, all the kindness and good acts that we have [...] shown them."

In March, the first of the Dalecarlian rebellions took place organized by Knut Mickelsson and Christina's former chancellor Peder Jakobsson (Sunnanväder), who glorified the reign of the Sture family in contrast to that of Gustav Vasa. The rebels reportedly contacted Søren Norby, who in the same month was promised by Christian II to be his governor in Sweden should he depose King Gustav. In April, Norby was rumored to be on his way to Blekinge with a fleet, after which he launched attacks with his fleet from his base in Gotland. King Gustav sent Berend von Melen, married to his relative Margareta and governor of Kalmar Castle, to fight Norby. However, von Melen broke his loyalty to the king and allied with Søren Norby, a treason for which the king blamed his relative Margareta von Melen. Shortly after, Christina sent her son Nils to von Melen at Kalmar Castle, and it was evidently believed that von Melen would help Nils to unite with Norby. It was speculated abroad that Søren Norby and Berend von Melen would conquer Sweden together as they were "through their wives highly connected" in Sweden. At this point, the von Melen couple left for Germany, leaving Nils and a garrison in Kalmar, which was sieged by the troops of Gustav I, while Christina herself seems to have been placed in arrest. In May, the Dalecarlian rebels reproached King Gustav for having imprisoned Christina and having driven her son Nils out of the country and demanded Christina's freedom.

On 20 July 1525, however, the rebellion was crushed when Nils, the son of Christina, was taken prisoner by King Gustav after his victory at the Siege of Kalmar. When Norby negotiated to submit his loyalty to the new king of Denmark, Frederick I, one of his demands were to secure help from Frederick I to secure Christina's release from the prison of Gustav.

In November 1525, Christina and King Gustav I were reconciled in a meeting in Vadstena, where Christina stated that she had never contemplated to marry Søren Norby and that the engagement gifts she sent him were merely gifts of gratitude because he had assisted her and her children from the captivity in Denmark. In a letter from Vadstena on 29 December, she denied ever having contemplated a marriage with Søren Norby. The same month, King Gustav I stated that Christina was to marry his cousin riksråd Johan Turesson Tre Rosor, Lord of Falun, riksråd and governor of Nyköping (149?–1556): they were officially engaged at Christmans 1526 and married at Lindholmen Castle, Västergötland, in the summer of 1527. Her second marriage was likely arranged by the king to neutralize Christina politically, as which she would no longer have the prestige of being "The widow of Sten Sture" and leader of the Sture party, but the wife of a loyal relative of the king. From her second marriage, she had a son, Gustaf Johansson. Eric XIV made Svante Count of Vestervik and Stegeholm, and at the same time made Gustaf Count of Enköping (later changed to county of Bogesund).

In the official chronicle of the king, the elder son of Christina, Nils, is claimed to have died the year of his mother's remarriage. In 1527, however, the second of the Dalecarlian Rebellions broke out in opposition to Gustav's introduction of the Protestant Reformation to Sweden, and the leader of the rebellion was the so-called Daljunkern ('The youngster from Dalarna'), who claimed to be Nils Sture, the 15-year-old elder son of Christina. Modern research indicate that Daljunkern was indeed Nils, the son of Christina. Gustav defeated the rebels, and Daljunkern fled to Norway and then Germany, where he was arrested in Rostock. In August 1528, King Gustav had Christina issue an official statement that Daljunkern was not her son. In order to have the Daljunkern executed, Gustav I had Christina write a statement in which she stated that of all the sons she had with regent Sten, the only son alive was Svante. Preserved documents show that the first version of Christina's letter was written carefully and only asked the authorities in Rostock to send the person claiming to be Nils to Sweden for questioning: in the final version of the letter, which was eventually sent, however, she called him a thief and impostor and demanded that he be executed on the spot. It is considered likely that she wrote the letter under pressure.

== Later life ==
The relationship between Christina and King Gustav was described as somewhat tense. After the death of her mother in 1527, Christina and Gustav came to be involved in a conflict over her inheritance after her mother, which was not solved until 1550.

During the Westrogothian rebellion in 1529, Christina was given the task by the king to negotiate with her rebellious brother-in-law Jöran Turesson (Tre Rosor).

During the Dacke War, the king ordered her that she should prevent any rebels who reached Nyköping to acquire supplies and imprison them.

Her second son Svante was, according to tradition, engaged to her relative Margaret Leijonhufvud, who however was arranged to marry the king in 1536. After the marriage of Margaret to the king, Christina and other relatives of the new queen were granted some privileges, such as the right to some of the money from the fines paid to the crown. It is noted that she evidently attended court during the tenure of Margaret as queen, as she, alongside Margaret's mother Ebba Eriksdotter Vasa, is often listed to have occupied the best rooms next to the queen. Whether she was ever given a court office is unknown. It is confirmed that she was briefly made responsible for the court of the royal children between the death of queen Margaret in 1551 and the king's marriage to queen Katarina Stenbock in 1552. Christina died in January 1559 at Hörningsholm Castle.

== See also ==
- Mette Dyre
- Brita Tott
- Ingeborg Tott
- Anna Leuhusen

== Notes ==
Christina Gyllenstierna Born: 1494 Died: January 1559
Swedish royalty
| Preceded by Mette Dyre | Regent consort of Sweden; 1512–1520 | Succeeded by Isabella of Austria as Queen consort |
