= Peder Galle =

Swedish politician

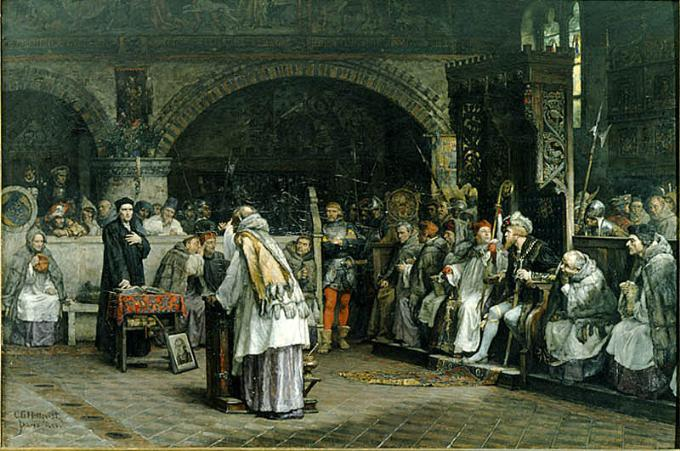
Disputation between Olaus Petri and Peder Galle

Peder Galle (before 1476, died around 1538) was a Swedish Catholic priest, professor of theology, archdeacon of the Uppsala Diocese and member of parliament for the clergy.

== Biography ==
Peder Galle was born as belonging to the noble family Galle, who carried three wolf teeth in the coat of arms.

Galle enrolled on 1 May 1476 as a student at Rostock University and later also studied in Rome. He is mentioned in the 1480s as a magister artium liberalium and as a lecturer at Uppsala University. In 1487, he seems to have served as pastor in Närtuna. He was promoted in 1500 to a doctor of theology, probably at the University of Siena. In 1504 and 1512, he was again in Uppsala as doctor and cantor at the cathedral chapter, later said to have been archdeacon. He is mentioned after 1520 as scholasticus in Uppsala and calls himself in a document from the year 1531 theological professor.

As an assistant at Christian II 's coronation, he was an eyewitness of the Stockholm Bloodbath and, together with some other canons, wrote a story about the same, on behalf of the director general Gustaf Eriksson.

=== The Reformation in Sweden ===
At the end of 1526, Gustav Vasa on the advice of Laurentius Andreæ, decided to hold a religious conversation between Lutheran doctrine and Catholicism. To this end, the king sent ten questions to Galle in a letter on December 4, requesting that he, who was "a doctor in that helie script", should answer them in writing from his point of view before Christmas Eve. Later, two more questions were added. The questions written by Laurentius Andreæ concerned the biblical support for certain Catholic customs such as the worship of saints and the belief in purgatory and were clearly formulated to question the Catholic faith. Peder Galle should have written his answer, but on the advice of Hans Brask he avoided meeting Olaus Petri in public, who also received and answered the questions and at Christmas time twice traveled up to Uppsala in a dissertation.

The old information about a formal disputation in Uppsala (1524 according to Erik Jöransson Tegel, 1525 according to Peder Swart) has proved incorrect.

On the other hand, a disputation really took place during Västerås Riksdag in 1527, but not during the troubled day after Gustav's resignation, but only after the estates gave their answer to the king's "representations", so it can not have influenced Västerås Riksdag decision, as previously usually assumed. Even before this dissertation, in May 1527, Olaus Petri had published in printed format Galle's answers to the king's questions and his refutation under the title Swaar on twelve questions. In this writing, Galle appears as an astute, learned and resourceful man. With calmness and dignity he defended his position, Christianity as laid out by the Church Fathers.

In 1527, he was appointed the one representative of the Uppsala cathedral chapter at Västerås Riksdag, as well as the church council in Strängnäs in 1537.

He most likely died in 1537 or the beginning of 1538.
