= Margareta Eriksdotter Vasa =

Swedish noblewoman (1497–1536)

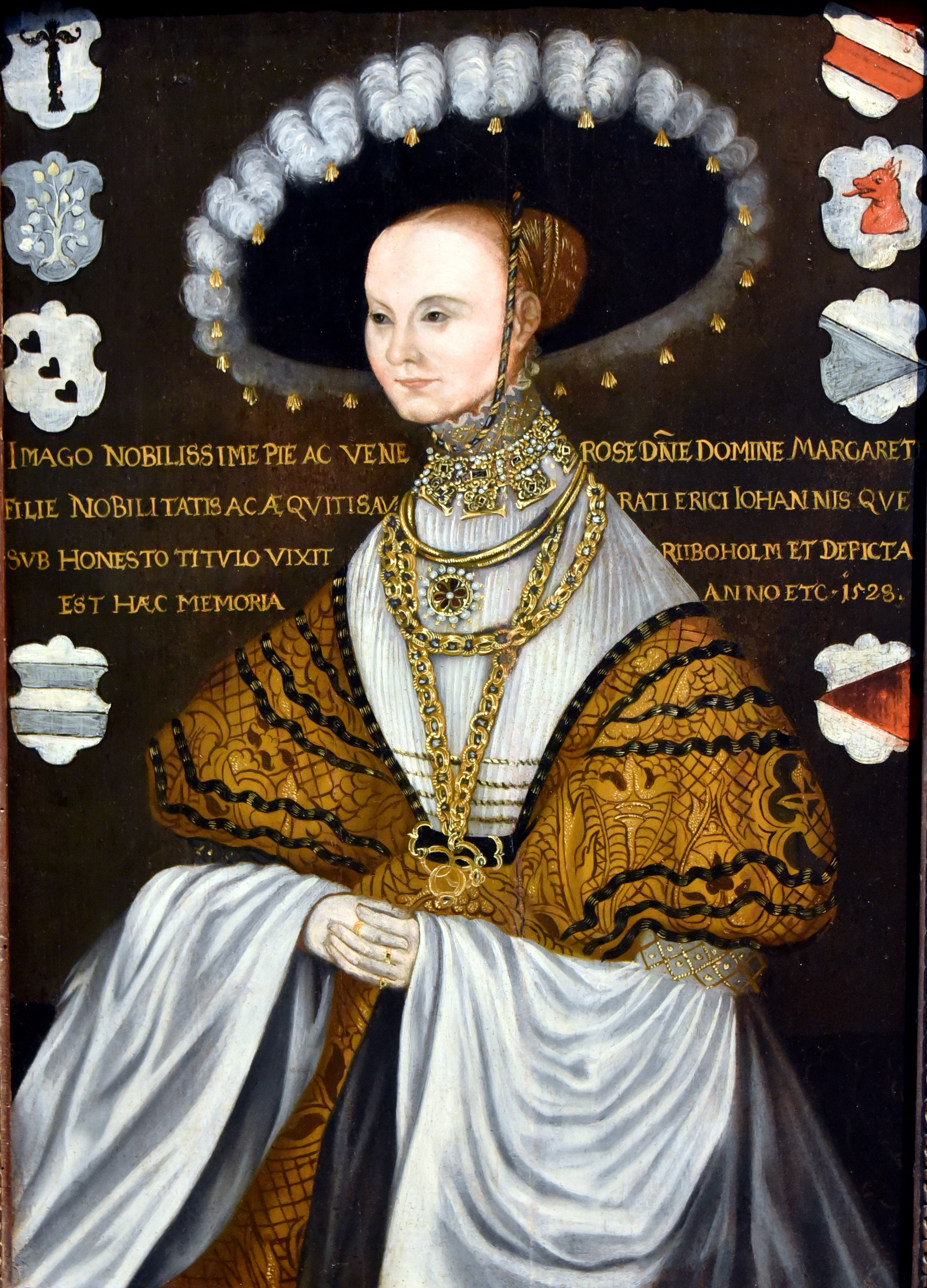
Margareta Eriksdotter Vasa

Margareta Eriksdotter Vasa

Margareta Eriksdotter Vasa (1497 – 31 December 1536), also called Margareta Vasa and Margareta of Hoya, was a Swedish noblewoman, sister of King Gustav I of Sweden. Between 1525 and 1534, she commanded Vyborg Castle on several occasions during the absence of her spouse.

== Life ==
=== Early life ===
Margareta was born to Erik Johansson Vasa and Cecilia Månsdotter and thus sister to the future king Gustav Vasa. Nothing is known of her childhood, but it is known that she could speak both Swedish and German, that she could read and write (which was not a given thing even by members of the nobility in this period) and that she had a great interest in literature: she placed her own daughters in school at Sko Abbey at the age of five, and it is considered likely that she was herself also spent a period at convent school, which was at the time customary within the Swedish nobility.

On 30 March 1516, she married riksråd Joakim Brahe at Tre Kronor (castle) in a wedding hosted by the Swedish regent Sten Sture the Younger: her spouse was a loyal follower of Sture, and the regent was married to her aunt, Christina Gyllenstierna.

In November 1520, Margareta and her spouse attended the coronation of Christian II of Denmark as king of Sweden. Her spouse and father belonged to those executed at the Stockholm Bloodbath. Margareta and her children, along with her mother, sister Emerentia, grandmother Sigrid Eskilsdotter (Banér) and aunt Christina Gyllenstierna, belonged to the women and children related to the executed that were imprisoned at Stockholm Castle and then transferred to the infamous Blåtårn ("Blue Tower") of Copenhagen Castle the following summer.

In the chronicle of her son Per Brahe the Elder (who was with her during the captivity) the captivity of the Swedish noblewomen in Denmark were described: "They were much deprived of food and drink [...]. Hardly given enough each day to keep their lives but they worked to be fed": king Gustav I of Sweden used their treatment in captivity in his propaganda against Christian II and claimed that the Danish monarch starved the women and children who only survived by the mercy showed them by the queen of Denmark, Isabella of Austria. Whatever the truth of this, it is confirmed that many of the imprisoned women and children died, among them Margareta's mother Cecilia, sister Emerentia and cousin Magdalena, though the cause of death are given as the plague, at that point used to classify a number of different illnesses.

=== The King's sister ===
In 1524, Margareta was released and returned to Sweden, where her brother was now king Gustav I. In August of that year, she was engaged to the German count John VII of Hoya and Brockenhusen, and the wedding took place 15 January 1525 in Stockholm. The marriage was arranged by her brother for political reasons. During his early reign, the German nobles John VII of Hoya and Berend von Melen belonged to the most trusted allies of the king, and he arranged the marriage between John VII of Hoya and his sister Margareta and Berend von Melen and his second cousin Margareta to secure their loyalty: the marriages were however controversial among the peasantry, who disliked the Germans around the king and criticized them and the foreign marriages when the king married the German princess Catherine of Saxe-Lauenburg. After their marriage, king Gustav granted the governorship of Vyborg Castle (an important stronghold against Russia) to John VII of Hoya and Kalmar Castle (an important stronghold against Denmark) to Berend von Melen.

Margareta settled in Vyborg Castle in Finland in the spring of 1525 and was, as was the contemporary custom, made responsible for the office of her spouse and command of the fortress whenever he was absent on the frequent assignments given to him by the king. She corresponded with her brother the king about both political, religious and private issues, which is partially preserved. Margareta disliked her life in Finland, was afraid of the Russians and asked for permission to return to Sweden, but he refused stating that he needed her there. During the Swedish Reformation, she expressed concerns over the rumors that her brother was destroying churches and convents, which she had been informed by her chaplain, but he replied that she was surely able to tell truths from lies, and that he expected her to interrogate and punish her chaplain for such traitorous thoughts.

In 1528, she visited Lübeck in Germany. On her return to Sweden in April 1529, she and Wulf Gyl were captured by mayor Nils Arvidsson of Jönköping. This incident was the beginning of the Westrogothian rebellion of the nobility against the ongoing Swedish Reformation. The rebellion was successfully subdued by her brother in May, and she was released unharmed.

In the summer of 1531, Margareta and John of Hoya were assigned to head the fleet of the "highest lords and ladies of the realm" sent to escort the bride of the king, Catherine of Saxe-Lauenburg, from Germany to her wedding with the king in Stockholm. Margareta was interested in literature and corresponded with bishop Hans Brask, with whom she discussed and exchanged books.

=== Exile ===
In June 1534, during the Count's Feud, John VII of Hoya broke with Gustav I and left Sweden for Germany. He soon joined the Count's Feud and fought against Sweden. Margareta accompanied Johan to Germany with her children and their escape attracted attention and bad publicity about Gustav I around the Baltic Sea. The King wrote to her and asked her to abandon her traitorous husband and return to Sweden, but she refused, fearing to be imprisoned upon her return. Her son Per Brahe the Elder later stated that she had in fact not been worried for her own sake, but for the sake of her two sons from her second marriage because they were the brood of John VII of Hoya, "therefore she would not take them with her, nor to part with them".

When she was widowed in June 1535, she asked her brother if he would force her to enter another arranged marriage if she returned. When he avoided to answer her question and merely replied that if she did return, it was well, and if she refused, then she could to as she wished, she decided to stay abroad. She died in Tallinn in Estonia.

After her death, the king asked her son of her first marriage to return to Sweden, which he agreed to after negotiations with his brother-in-law and sister Brita in Sweden.

== Family ==
Marriages and children:

1. Joakim Brahe (died 1520 in the Stockholm Bloodbath)
  1. Mauritz (1517-died young)
  2. Brita Joakimsdotter Brahe (1518-1554), married in 1531 to baron Birger Nilsson Grip.
  3. Öllegård Joakimsdotter Brahe (1519-1527), died in Sko Abbey, where she was at school.
  4. Per Brahe (1520–1590)
2. John VII of Hoya (died 1535 in the Count's Feud on Funen, Denmark)
  1. John (1529–1574), bishop of Osnabrück.
  2. Jobst, co-adjutor in Cologne. He was captured by Franz von Halle and died in prison.

== Bibliography ==
- Larsson, Lars-Olof . Gustav Vasa - landsfader eller tyrann?
- Stålberg, Wilhelmina. (in Swedish) : Anteckningar om svenska qvinnor (Notes on Swedish women)
- Starbäck, Carl Georg (1868). Berättelser ur svenska historien. "bd 8". Stockholm: Abraham Bohlins boktryckeri. Libris 1583728
- Svenskt Biografiskt Lexikon (SBL), cd-skiva, band 19
