= Catherine of Saxe-Lauenburg =

Queen of Sweden from 1531 to 1535

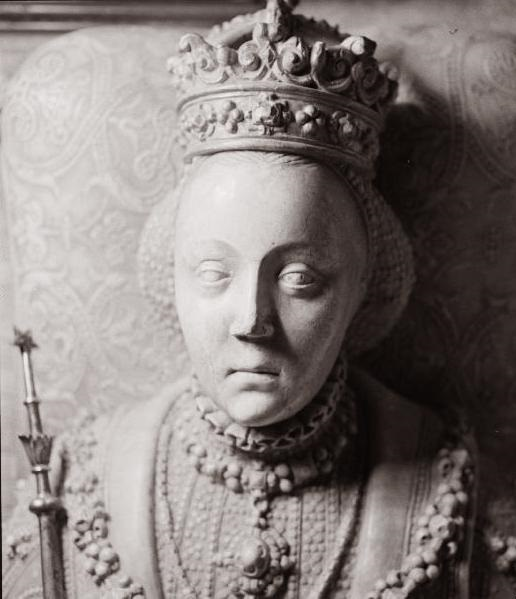
- Catherine as depicted on her tomb

Queen consort of Sweden
- Tenure: 24 September 1531 – 23 September 1535
- Born: 24 September 1513; Ratzeburg
- Died: 23 September 1535 (aged 21); Stockholm
- Burial: Uppsala Cathedral
- Spouse: Gustav I of Sweden
- Issue: Erik XIV of Sweden
- House: Ascania
- Father: Magnus I, Duke of Saxe-Lauenburg
- Mother: Catherine of Brunswick-Lüneburg
- Religion: Lutheran

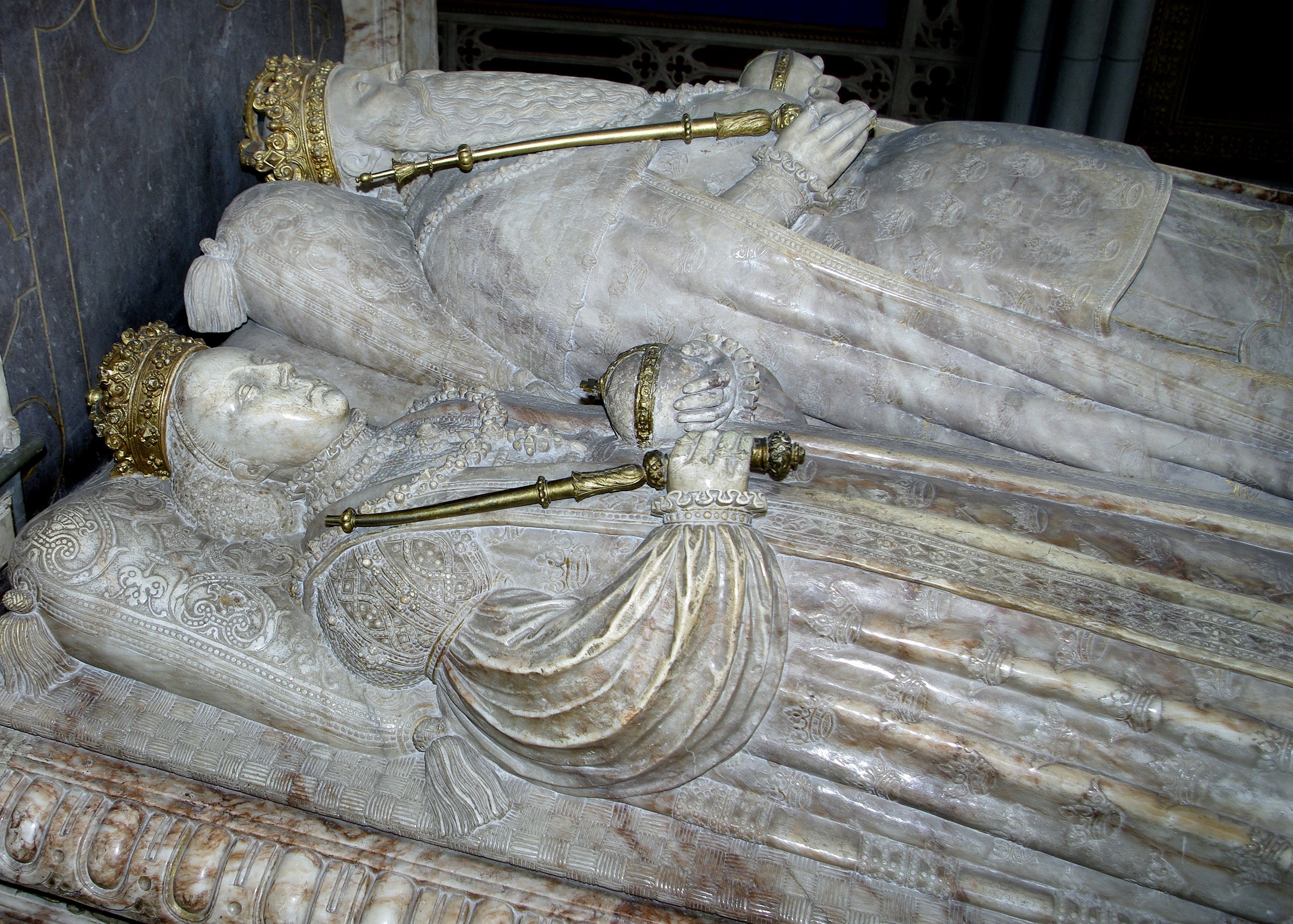
King Gustav and Queen Catherine depicted on their tomb effigies

Catherine of Saxe-Lauenburg (Swedish: Katarina av Sachsen-Lauenburg; 24 September 1513 – 23 September 1535) was Queen of Sweden as the first wife of Gustav I from 1531 until her death in 1535.

== Life ==
Catherine was born in Ratzeburg to Magnus I, Duke of Saxe-Lauenburg and Catherine, daughter of Henry IV, Duke of Brunswick-Lüneburg.

Though little is known about her early life and upbringing , it is known that Catherine's mother was a strict Catholic and would have raised her daughters to be pious.

Her marriage to Gustav I of Sweden was arranged for political reasons. Gustav wished to marry shortly after having taken the Swedish throne. He had failed in his negotiations to marry Dorothea of Denmark (also proposed to by Philip of Hesse who was considered more advantageous); Sophia of Mecklenburg; Anna of Pomerania (parents considered his rule too unstable); and Hedwig of Poland (parents discontinued negotiations because of Swedish Reformation), and was finally advised to consider the Duchy of Saxe-Lauenburg.

Though the duchy was small and poor, it had many advantages: its dynasty was related to many of the most powerful dynasties of Europe, which would give valuable connections with the German princes; it was Protestant, which was important for the ongoing Swedish Reformation, but could also give Imperial connections through Catherine's mother; it would give a valuable link to Denmark, as Catherine's older sister Dorothea was married to Christian, the Crown Prince of Denmark; and finally, the duchy at that point was known as a center for mercenaries, which was important for Gustav as a newly established ruler. The negotiations started in 1528, but were delayed several years as the bride's father doubted the stability of the Swedish throne, doubt partially confirmed by events such as the Dalecarlian rebellions. Finally, with mediation from Lübeck, they were completed after almost three years, and Catherine was granted the counties of Korsholm, Kalmar and Öland as a dower.

In September 1531, Catherine together with her mother and sister Clara ,was escorted to Sweden on a fleet by the "highest lords and ladies of the realm" headed by her future sister-in-law Margaret with her spouse Count John of Hoya, and met her future husband for the first time. Catherine could only speak German, of which Gustav only knew a little which meant that their communication would have taken place only through intermediaries.

Described as being "gracious" , Catherine was at 169 cm, tall for a woman of this time.

Their wedding was celebrated in Stockholm on her 18th birthday 24 September 1531 in the St. Nikolai church. Shortly after the royal wedding, in events hosted by King Gustav and Queen Catherine, Brita Leijonhufvud, the daughter of the king's second cousin Ebba Eriksdotter Vasa, was married to the king's courtier and favorite Gustav Olsson Stenbock (they were to be the parents of the king's third wife Catherine Stenbock) and the king's niece Brita Joakimsdotter Brahe was engaged to riksråd Birger Nilsson Grip. These were the first events Catherine hosted as queen of Sweden.

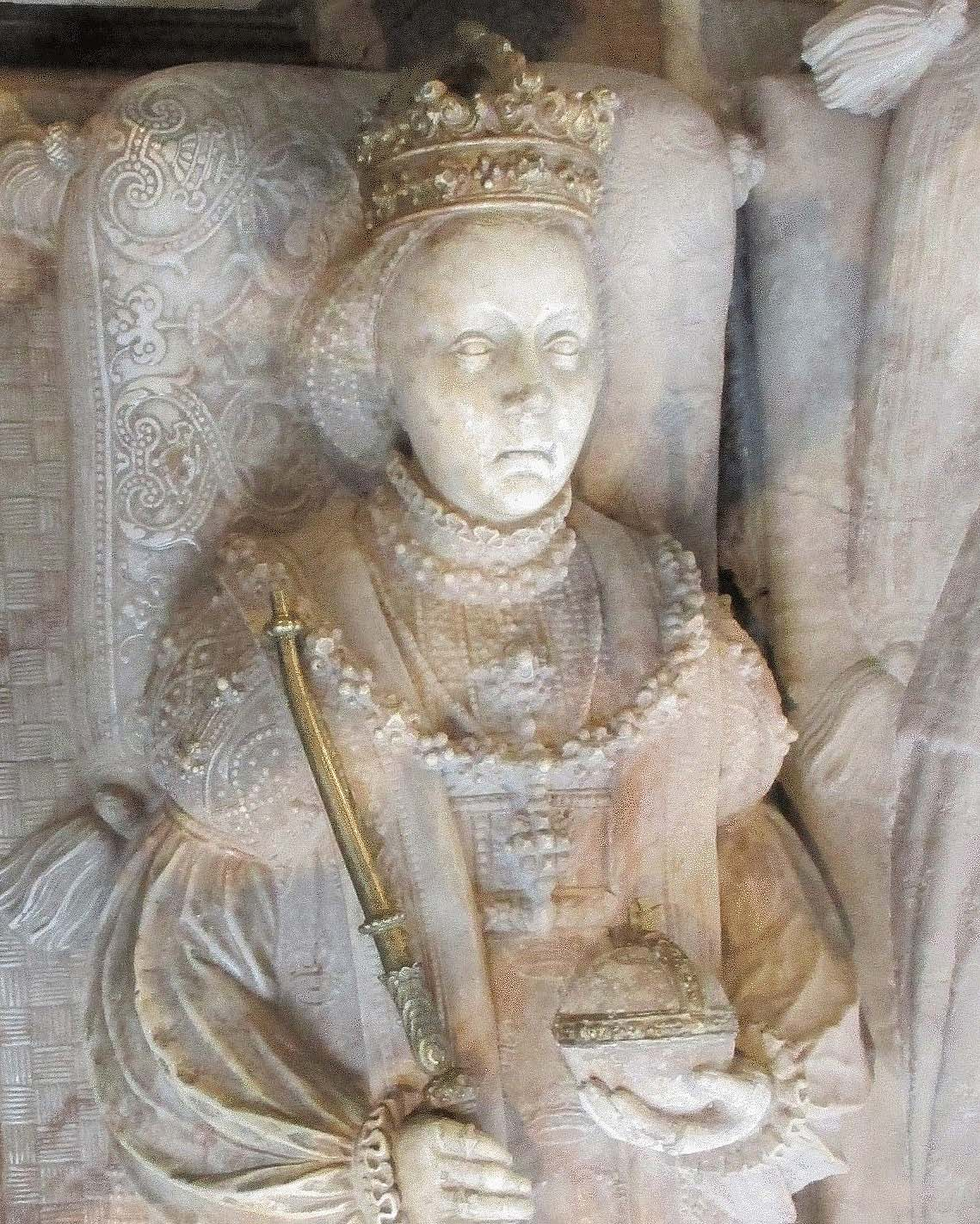
Catherine's effigy with more detail

Very little is known about Queen Catherine as a person and her tenure as queen. There is no information on her courtiers, though she is assumed to have brought ladies-in-waiting from Germany in addition to her Swedish ones, among whom Margaret Leijonhufvud (the king's future second queen) is likely to have been one. Traditional history describes Catherine as capricious, cold, melancholic and discontent, and the marriage has been described as a stormy and unhappy one. There is, however, no contemporary information on that.

On 13 December 1533, she fulfilled her most important task as queen consort by giving birth to an heir to the throne: the future King Erik XIV.

In September 1535, during a ball given in honor of her brother-in-law, King Christian III of Denmark, who was visiting the Swedish royal court, Queen Catherine fell while pregnant during a dance with Christian III. The fall confined her to bed and led to complications, and she died on 23 September with her unborn child.

At the time of her death, King Gustav was involved in the Count's Feud, and his opponents in this conflict, Lübeck and Rostock, spread the rumor that he had murdered his queen by beating her on the head with a silver cane after a report from a spy that she had slandered him to Christian while dancing. The exhumation of Catherine's skeleton done in the 1940s showed no sign of any such injury, and no accusations were ever made by her family. Furthermore, Christian III himself confirmed the serious fall of Queen Catherine in his private letters, even though he was no friend of Gustav Vasa's.

In traditional history writings, Queen Catherine was given a bad reputation and often presented as a bad example, by contrast to the second queen of Gustav I, Queen Margaret, who was made out to be a stereotypically and perfectly ideal queen.

Catherine of Saxe-Lauenburg House of Ascania Born: 24 September 1513 Died: 23 September 1535
Swedish royalty
Preceded by Isabella of Austria	Queen consort of Sweden; 1531–1535	Succeeded by Margaret Leijonhufvud
