= Brigitta Lars Anderssons =

Swedish Cunning woman and courtier

Brigitta Lars Anderssons (died after 1551) or Birgitta Lass Andersson ('Birgitta, Wife of Lars Andersson'), also called Brigitta Andersdotter ('Birgitta Daughter of Anders'), was a Swedish cunning woman and courtier. She was the nurse of the royal children of King Gustav I of Sweden and queen Margaret Leijonhufvud, and also a personal favorite and de facto physician of the queen.

== Life ==
Birgitta is mentioned as the nurse with the responsibility of the royal children, who are confirmed to have had their own household from at least 1540 onward called Barnastugan ('Children's Crib'). The court staff are only fragmentary known from this period: aside from Birgitta, the royal children were supervised by the queen's cousin and namesake lady Margareta, the noble widow Ingrid Amundsdotter and occasionally, Ebba Eriksdotter Vasa and Christina Gyllenstierna. Birgitta was apparently well trusted by the queen with the welfare of the children, who especially preferred to ensure that Birgitta was with them when she herself was away.

Birgitta seem to have been a commoner. She was a personal confidante and trusted favorite of queen Margaret and evidently entrusted by her not only with the care of the royal children but with various tasks, such as queen Margaret's personal business transactions. In 1545, for example, the queen had made a financial loss by a loan to a certain Anders Persson in Nyköping, which she was eventually able to retrieve with Birgitta as her financial agent. The queen referred to her as “älskeliga hustru Brigitta Lars Anderssons“ ('The lovable Goodwife Birgitta Lars Anderssons').

Evidently, Birgitta was a natural folk healer, who was apparently much trusted by the queen and her siblings for her medical ability. She acted as the de facto personal physician and nurse to the queen when she was ill. On 15 March 1549, for example, the queen, who had recently been ill and tended to by Birgitta, recommended her to her sister, Martha Leijonhufvud, when she was informed that her sister was ill, and reportedly, Birgitta was an efficient physician who managed to cure at least Martha at this occasion. In 1551, the queen sent Birgitta again to Martha upon request to practice medicine, despite the fact that she, as she pointed out, would have preferred to have Birgitta remain at court in the royal nursery during her absence, as she was soon to accompany the king on a journey.

Upon the illness of the queen in August 1551, Brigitta Lars Anderssons was called upon to attend her in 17th, several days before the king's physician was called upon on the 23rd. After the death of queen Margaret, the king granted Brigitta Lars Anderssons the bishop's part of the income from the parish of Runtuna in Nyköping as an annuity for life.

== Sources ==
- Tegenborg Falkdalen, Karin, Margareta Regina: vid Gustav Vasas sida : [en biografi över Margareta Leijonhufvud (1516-1551)], Setterblad, Stockholm, 2016
- Wilhelmina Stålberg (in Swedish): Anteckningar om svenska qvinnor (Notes on Swedish women)
- Karin Tegenborg Falkdalen (2010). Vasadöttrarna (utgåva 2). Falun: Historiska Media. ISBN 978-91-85873-87-6
