= Margaret Leijonhufvud =

Queen of Sweden from 1536 to 1551

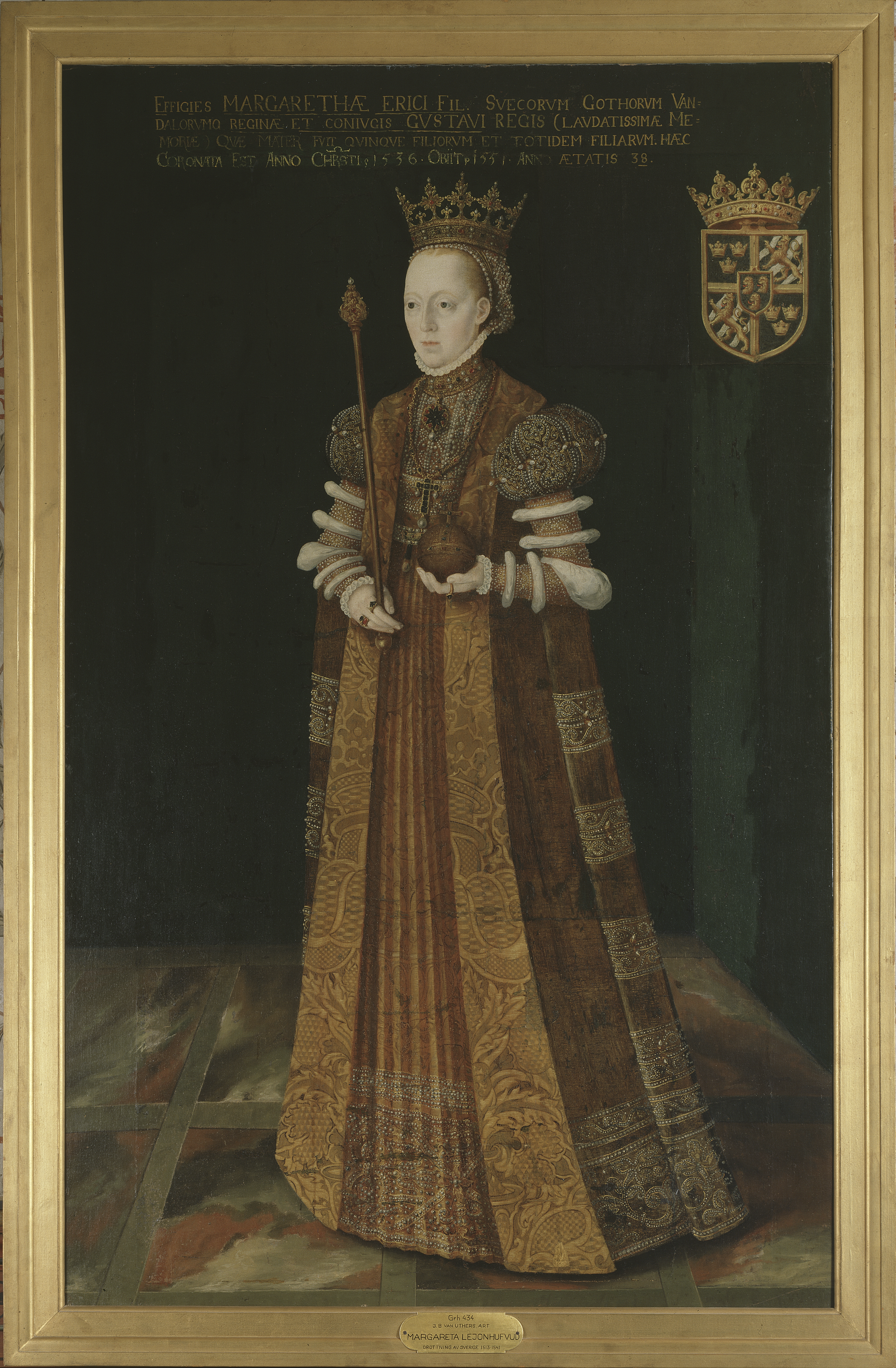
- Posthumous portrait attributed to Johan Baptista van Uther

Queen consort of Sweden
- Tenure: 1 October 1536 – 26 August 1551
- Coronation: 2 October 1536
- Born: 1 January 1516; Ekeberg Castle, Närke, Sweden
- Died: 26 August 1551 (aged 35); Tynnelsö Castle, Södermanland, Sweden
- Burial: Uppsala Cathedral, Sweden
- Spouse: Gustav I of Sweden
- Issue: John III of Sweden; Catherine, Countess of East Frisia; Cecilia, Margravine of Baden-Rodemachern; Magnus, Duke of Östergötland; Anna, Countess Palatine of Veldenz; Sophia, Duchess of Saxe-Lauenburg; Elizabeth, Duchess of Mecklenburg-Gadebusch; Charles IX of Sweden
- House: Leijonhufvud
- Father: Erik Abrahamsson Leijonhufvud
- Mother: Ebba Eriksdotter Vasa

Margaret Leijonhufvud or Margareta Eriksdotter (1 January 1516 – 26 August 1551) was Queen of Sweden from 1536 to 1551 as the second wife of King Gustav I. She served as an adviser to the king and an intermediary in political affairs.

== Biography ==
=== Early life ===
Margaret Leijonhuvfud was a member of one of Sweden's most powerful noble families: the early Leijonhufvud clan of Swedish nobility (the name meaning Lion's Head), being the daughter of Erik Abrahamsson Leijonhufvud, a man executed in the Stockholm bloodbath, and wife Ebba Eriksdotter Vasa, the second cousin of king Gustav.

There is very little known of her life prior to her marriage. Her father was executed when she was four years old, during which time she hid with her mother and siblings in the Västerås Monastery. She spent her childhood mainly at Lo Castle in Västergötland and Ekeberg in Närke. At that time, the contemporary educational ideal for a Swedish noblewoman was to be tutored in reading, writing, economics, and mathematics. She was expected to learn how to manage a large estate and landholding and perform the duties of her future spouse in his absence, as well as to have knowledge at least in the German language except Swedish, and to deport herself with humility but also dignity by reading religious literature. Finally, it was customary for a girl from the nobility to spend some time in a convent to complete her education, and Margaret is likely to have received this customary education.

Though there is no explicit confirmation of this, it is considered very likely for Margaret to have served as a maid-of-honour to the queen, Catherine of Saxe-Lauenburg: she was 15 years old in 1531 when the king married Catherine. Her sister Brita married the king's favorite courtier Gustav Olofsson Stenbock in the presence of the royal couple shortly after, and though no list of Queen Catherine's ladies survives, Margaret's social position, connections, age, and contemporary custom makes it extremely likely that she completed her education by serving the queen, as was the custom for girls of her position at the time.

=== Marriage ===
Gustav I with his second wife, Margaret Leijonhufvud

In 1535, the King was widowed by Catherine of Saxe-Lauenburg and left with only one legitimate child and heir. A new marriage for the King was deemed necessary, and his decision to choose a spouse from among the nobility has been explained by the need to secure inner support and allies among the nobility for his rule, and because of the political and religious difficulties, along with the great cost and time, involved in negotiating a marriage with a foreign princess.

Margaret was selected to marry the king as she belonged to one of the leading noble families of the realm, creating an alliance between the king and one of the most powerful factions of the nobility; her mother was a relative of the king, and her sisters were both married to the king's favorite courtiers: Birgitta "Brita" to Gustav Olofsson Stenbock, and Anna to Axel Eriksson Bielke.

There is no confirmation about how Margaret felt about the marriage: both church law, as well as secular law, banned forced marriages, but both religious and secular custom demanded that children should obey their parents. According to the traditional tale, Margaret hid in a box when the king came to her parents' estate to propose.

Margaret married King Gustav I October 1536 in Uppsala Cathedral in a ceremony conducted by archbishop Laurentius Petri and was crowned Queen there the next day. At her wedding, her brothers Abraham and Sten were knighted, as well as her brother-in-law were named riksråd, beginning what was referred to as the period of the Kungafränderna ('The King's Relatives'), meaning the relatives he acquired through marriage with Margaret, in which her relatives were given prominent positions and influence at court as the king's closest allies, married in with the king's relatives and often present at official royal representational ceremonies. During the first years of their marriage, Margaret's mother Ebba played a dominating role in the royal court, and it was said that even the king did not dare to oppose his mother-in-law.

According to tradition, Margaret was engaged to Svante Sture when the king decided to marry her, but her family broke the engagement and her former fiancé was married to her sister, Martha Leijonhufvud, instead. A story describes how her sister's marriage came about. According to tradition, the king caught his new queen and her former fiancé together alone, with the young man, Svante Sture, on his knees before the queen. The king reportedly asked in a rage: "What is this?!" upon which Queen Margaret swiftly answered: "My Lord Sture is asking me for the hand of my sister!" At this, the king just as swiftly answered: "Granted!"

And so, Svante Sture hastily married the queen's sister Martha Leijonhufvud. There is not documented confirmation that Margaret and Sture were engaged, but it is considered very likely, as their marriage would have been exactly what her family would have arranged for her, had she not married the king.

=== Queen ===
Coat of arms of Queen Margaret

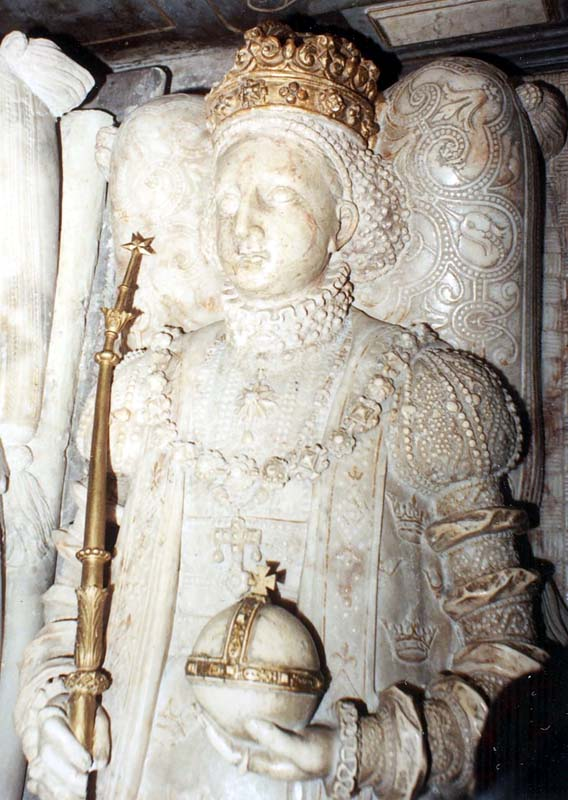
Queen Margaret as shown on her grave monument.

Queen Margaret's gilded silver crown (1560) at Uppsala Cathedral.

Queen Margaret has been considered intelligent and beautiful; she is described as a loyal wife who never abused her influence, as a responsible parent, a skillful manager of the royal court and household, and as a compassionate philanthropist of the poor and needing. The marriage has been described as happy, and the king was not known ever to have been unfaithful to her.

Margaret was loyally devoted to her birth family her entire life, who was greatly benefited by her royal marriage, and often successfully used her as mediator for benefits from the king. Several of her male relatives was given offices by the king, and her sisters benefited from favors granted to their spouses: her sister Anna's spouse was made the greatest landholder in Östergötland and her sister Brita's spouse the equivalent in Västergötland, while her widowed mother and maternal grandmother Anna Karlsdotter was granted personal lands and the right to the income of personal taxes from their peasantry. On a personal level, Margaret seems to have been closest to her sister Martha, who is most frequently mentioned in her correspondence, addressed as "The Dearest Sister of My Heart" and who more often than other family members successfully asked her for mediation with the king on behalf of herself, her spouse and supplicants.

As queen, she was given the responsibility of the royal household and as such the right to appoint artisans and merchants with Royal warrant of appointment. The members of the royal household are only fragmentarily known during her tenure, but she hosted a great number of maids-of-honour, who were successively married to the king's male courtiers in order to carefully balance the power among the noble families of the realm. One of the most well-known of such marriages is that of the great heiress Ebba Lilliehöök. Among the most prominent members of her own staff was the cunning woman Birgitta Lass Andersson, a trusted favorite and confidante with medical knowledge, who was entrusted many of her private affairs and also saw to the health of herself, her sister Martha and children.

Margaret was also a landlord in her own right, and she was closely involved in the management of her personal estates and its dependents. She remained a Catholic her entire life despite the Swedish Reformation, and is known to have made donations to the still active Vadstena Abbey, following the example of her family, her mother being the benefactor of Vreta Abbey.

Queen Margaret is credited with meaningful influence over the monarch. Her influence was of the kind accepted for a queen consort in accordance with contemporary ideals — that of speaking to the King on the behalf of others, as well as performing political tasks he assigned to her as his deputy, rather than to have used her influence to promote any personal agenda. She was thus not regarded to have been politically active, and has been favorable compared to Queen Gunilla Bielke, who was said to meddle in politics.

Margaret allegedly had the ability to keep the monarchs' temperament under control, and was a calming influence on him. In accordance with the ideal of Luther's Small Catechism, it was her task as a wife to give her spouse advice, and act as a go-between and mediator to mitigate her spouse's punishments to the benefit of those in need, a form of influence which was considered legitimate and thus not regarded as interference in state affairs. She is known in history for her great activity in this regard and often successful, something Gustavus himself admitted, when he reduced a sentence at her request. She managed to get punishments he meted out reduced, and advised him to show mercy and leniency, all of which made her popular.

Because of this activity she received a large number of petitions from supplicants who used her as a go-between for them and the king. She is said to have been credited with a great diplomatic ability, which made it possible for her to have success rather than to irritate the king when she came to him and spoke to him on others' behalf in various issues, some of them indeed political. There are many examples of this, ranging from business permits to death sentences and political issues. Already in the autumn of 1536, a pardon for a criminal sentenced to execution was mitigated by the king "For the sake of the Prayer of Our Dear Mistress Queen Margaret", and she also managed to have the king return the confiscated property of Margareta Gire, wife of the exiled suspected conspirator Wulf Gyler, release her from custody and allow her to depart to her spouse in Germany. The king, however, did not always like her influence over him to be abused and her mediation activity to be so extensive and was on at least one occasion known to have reprimanded a supplicant for having asked his queen to mediate rather than to come to him directly.

Queen Margaret could however also help supplicants without involving the king at all. Several cases are documented in which she helped supplicants with funds from her personal fortune, by contacting the right people and authorities in a court case or legal dispute, and when legal courts mitigated sentences "Because of the Gracious Prayer of Our Lady". In October 1547, for example, a woman named Anna, recently a widow of Peder Mattsson from Stockholm, was accused of adultery (at the time a legal offense) with her lover Rasmus Jute by a man named Simon; instead of attending her trial, however, Anna "entered the royal palace in secrecy and appealed personally to Our Dear Gracious Lady to be her of assistance", upon which the queen called for Anna's accuser and "Banned him from having anything whatever to do with her [Anna]", after which Anna was spared a trial and could remarry her lover. In a similar fashion, she interrupted the ongoing witch trial against the cunning woman Karin Åsmundz and had her let free. When the king arrested statesman Conrad von Pyhy, the queen sent for his wife Anna von Pyhy and gave her money so that she might return to her relatives in Germany before she would be in any danger due to her spouse's arrest.

King Gustav eventually gave Margaret political assignments and responsibilities. He gave her tasks such as supervising the governors of royal estates and power holders such as bailiffs or landholders, in order to prevent power abuse that could otherwise breed political unrest and rebellions. In 1543, he asked her to send spies to Södermanland to investigate whether there was any truth in rumored plans for rebellion there and if so, why the peasantry was discontent. She was entrusted tasks within foreign policy: when her brother Sten was sent as ambassador to the French royal court in 1542 in order to negotiate a Swedish-French alliance, Margaret was tasked to perform a diplomatic correspondence with the French king's influential sister Marguerite de Navarre in Latin, and she also attended the First Treaty of Brömsebro (1541).

In 1542, the king gave instructions to the governors of the royal castles of Läckö, Stegeborg, Gripsholm and Stockholm to keep them for Margaret in her name until his son became of age, if he should die while his heir was still a child, which in effect gave her control of the kingdom. In his succession order issued in Västerås in 1544, he stated that if he should die when his successor was still a child, Margaret should rule as regent in a guardian government with representatives of the nobility until the age of majority of his son.

=== Death ===
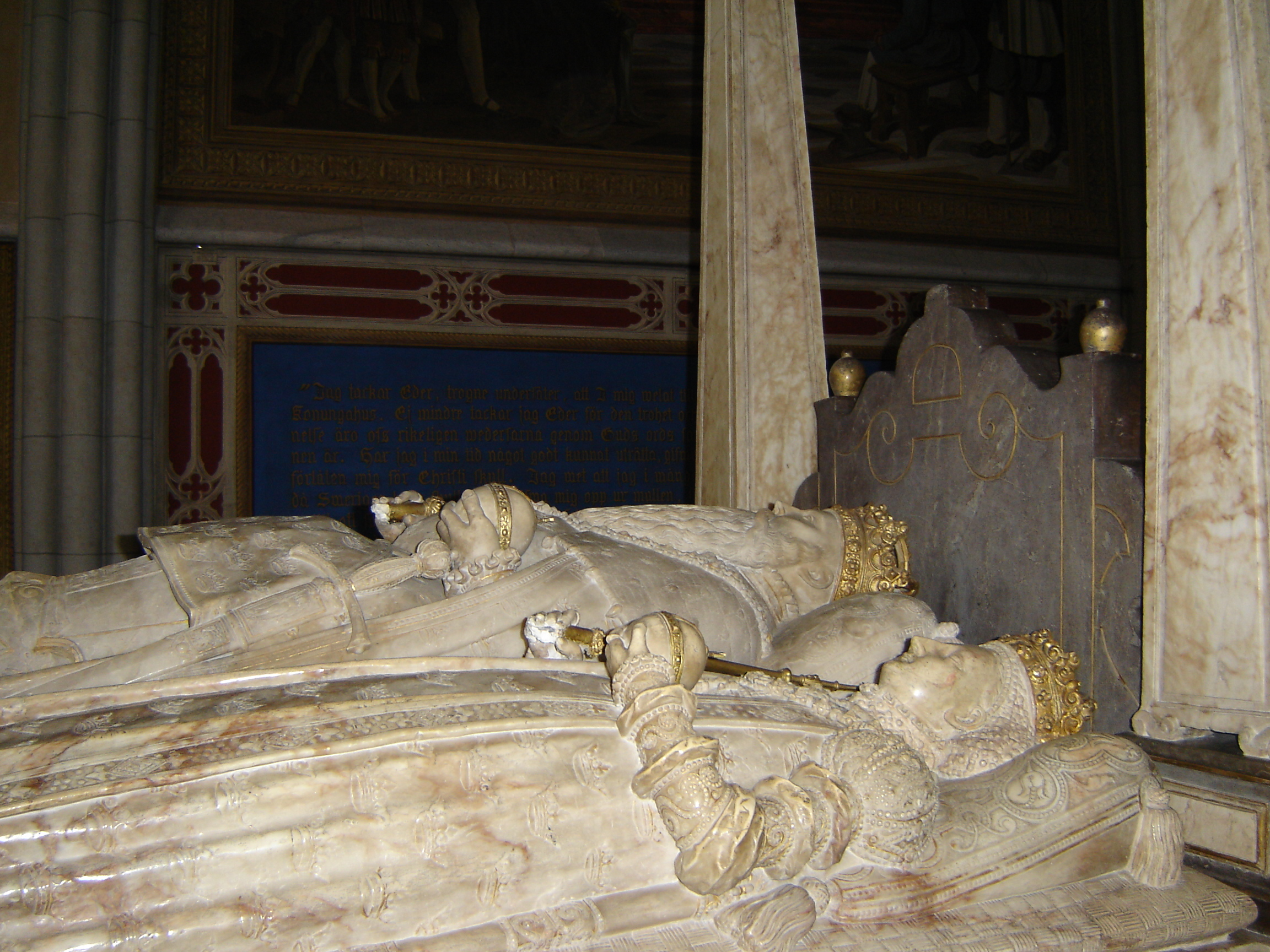
Grave monument to Margaret, Gustav and his first wife Catherine (far side) over their crypt in Uppsala Cathedral

Margaret was almost constantly pregnant, which devastated her health. In August 1551, she and her children made an excursion by boat on Mälaren between Gripsholm and Västerås, and on their return, she took ill with pneumonia. According to the chronicle of Aegidius Girs, Margaret thanked her spouse on her death bed for making her queen, regretted that she had not been worthy of it, and asked her children not to quarrel. When she died, she was deeply mourned by the king. Tradition say that an eclipse took place upon her death. She died at Tynnelsö Castle.

== Children ==
1. John III (Johan III; 1537–1592), Duke of Finland, King of Sweden 1567–1592
2. Catherine (1539–1610), wife of Edzard II, Count of East Frisia
3. Cecilia (1540–1627), wife of Christopher II, Margrave of Baden-Rodemachern
4. Magnus (1542–1595), Duke of Västanstång (western Östergötland) and Count of Dal (Dalsland), mentally ill
5. Karl (1544–1544)
6. Anna (1545–1610), wife of George John I, Count Palatine of Veldenz
7. Sten (1546–1547)
8. Sophia (1547–1611), wife of Duke Magnus II of Saxe-Lauenburg, who was nephew of Catherine of Saxe-Lauenburg
9. Elizabeth (1549–1597), wife of Christopher, Duke of Mecklenburg-Gadebusch
10. Charles IX (Karl IX; 1550–1611), Duke of Södermanland, Närke, Värmland and northern Västergötland, Regent of Sweden 1599–1604, King of Sweden 1604–1611

== Notes ==
Margaret Leijonhufvud Born: 1 January 1516 Died: 26 August 1551
Swedish royalty
Vacant Title last held by Catherine of Saxe-Lauenburg	Queen consort of Sweden; 1536–1551	Vacant Title next held by Katarina Stenbock
