= Västergötland rebellion =

Swedish rebellion in 1529

Margareta Eriksdotter Vasa

Västergötland rebellion (Swedish: Västgötaupproret), also known as Västgötabullret ("Västgöta thunder") or Västgötaherrarnas uppror ("rebellion of the nobility in Västergötland"), was a Swedish rebellion which took place in the provinces of Småland and Västergötland in Sweden during the spring of 1529. The rebellion was led by members of the Swedish nobility, and the purpose was to depose the Swedish King Gustav Vasa in an attempt to end the recently initiated Swedish Reformation.

== Rebellion ==
In 1527, King Gustav Vasa initiated the Swedish Reformation, which attracted opposition. In April 1529, the king's bailiff in Nydala in Småland was murdered. Shortly thereafter, the sister of the king, Margareta Eriksdotter Vasa, returned to Sweden after a visit to Germany, and was captured on her way by the mayor of Jönköping in Småland, Nils Arvidsson. This unleashed the discontent over the reformation, and the rebels held a meeting in Svenarum Parish in Småland on 4 April 1529 and in Lekaryd Parish on 8 April. They called for the provinces of Östergötland and Västergötland to join them in rebellion, and blocked the passage of the king to the provinces. In a meeting in Larv on 20 April, the representatives of the nobility of the province of Västergötland renounced their loyalty to the king and joined the rebellion. A decision was made to ask other provinces to join them.

The initiators and leaders of the rebellion were nobleman Ture Jönsson (Tre Rosor) and Bishop Magnus Haraldsson of Skara, and among the leading members were the riksråd Måns Bryntesson (Lilliehöök), riksråd Ture Eriksson (Bielke), lagman Nils Olofsson (Vinge), Tord Bonde, governor Nils Clausen of Älvsborg Castle, and Axel Nilsson Posse.

== Defeat ==
On 6 April, King Gustav successfully advised Östergötland not to join the rebellion and asked them to help him liberate his sister. He also successfully prevented other provinces from joining. On 16 April, he contacted the rebellious peasants of Småland, pardoned them for having killed his bailiff, and thanked them for providing for and protecting his sister. In a meeting between the rebels on 25 April, the peasantry of Västergötland encouraged the rebellious lords to write a statement of demands to the king in exchange for peace. In the king's reply on 6 May, he stated that he was willing to negotiate, but he also uttered a threat that all rebels belonging to the nobility would be punished. This caused a rift between the lords and the peasantry, and the two leaders Ture Jönsson (Tre Rosor) and Bishop Magnus Haraldsson of Skara fled to Denmark: the king unsuccessfully asked the King of Denmark to return them to him. Jöran Turesson (Tre Rosor), son of lord Svarte Ture Jönsson, and his private rebel army was captured in Hälsingland. The rebellion was thereby subdued.

== Aftermath ==
In June 1529, Måns Bryntesson (Lilliehöök), and Nils Olofsson (Vinge) were sentenced to death and executed; riksråd Ture Eriksson (Bielke) was pardoned because his mother asked for mercy on his part. All remaining rebels were pardoned and their sentences reduced to fines.

== Other Sources ==
- Västgötaupproret i Nordisk familjebok (andra upplagan, 1922)
- Starbäck, Carl Georg (1868). Berättelser ur svenska historien. "bd 8". Stockholm: Abraham Bohlins boktryckeri. Libris 1583728
