= The Fall of the King =

Novel by Johannes V. Jensen

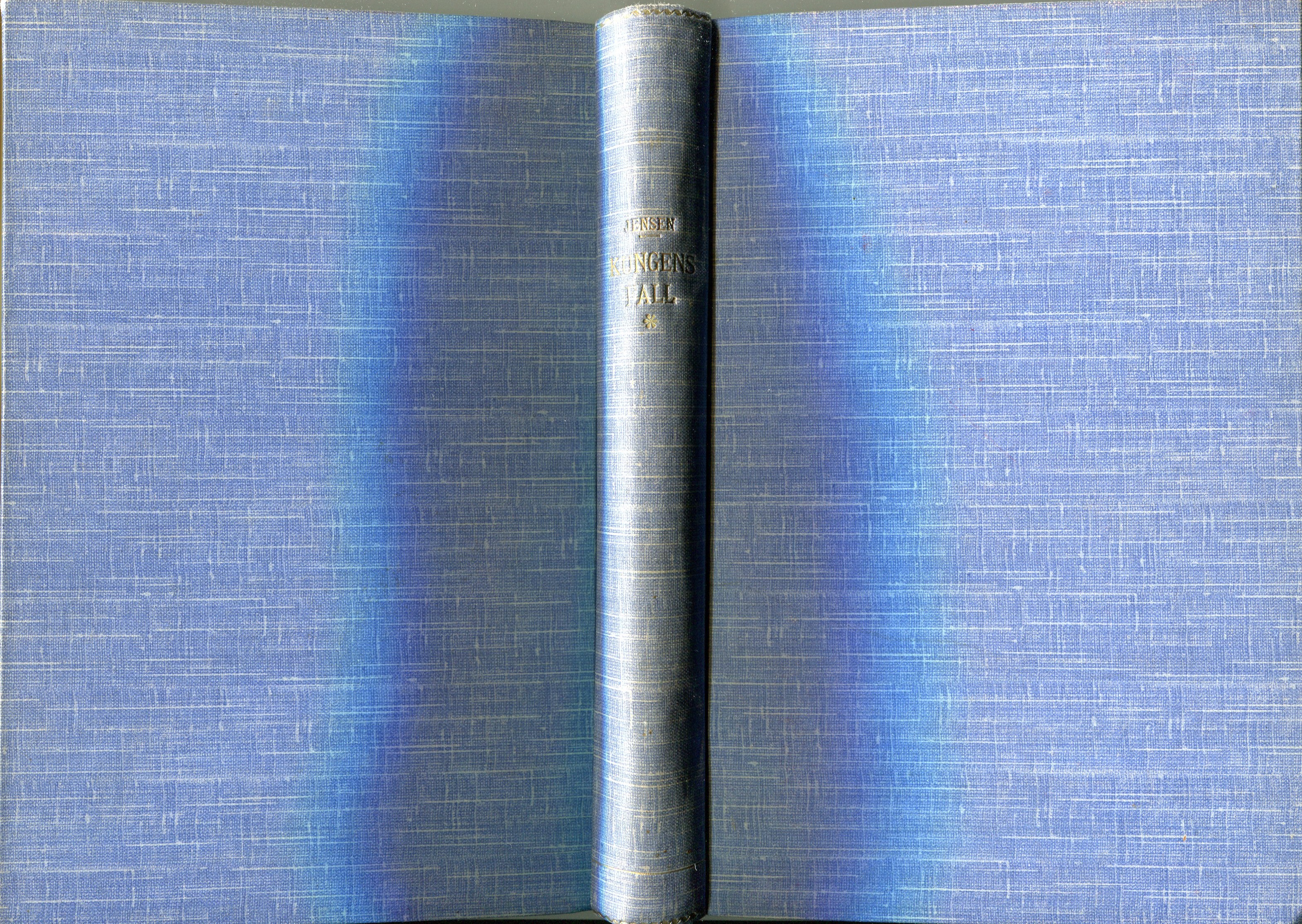
Cover of a 1906 Swedish version of the book

The Fall of the King (Danish: Kongens Fald) is a novel by Danish author Johannes V. Jensen, published in three parts from 1900 to 1901. It tells the story of Mikkel Thøgersen and the social entanglements which bring him into the service of king Christian II of Denmark.

== Summary ==
=== The Death of Spring (Foraarets Død) ===
Begins at around 1497 and ends with the defeat of the Danish army at Dithmarschen in 1500.

=== The Great Summer (Den store Sommer) ===
Takes place twenty years later, from the Stockholm Bloodbath in 1520 to the fall of the king in 1523.

=== The Winter (Vinteren) ===
The third and last part opens twelve years after, at the time of the Count's Feud in 1536, and ends at Mikkel's death.

== Critical acclaim ==
The Fall of the King was named best Danish novel of the 20th century by the newspapers Politiken and Berlingske Tidende, independently of each other, in 1999, and was in 2006 included in the controversial Culture Canon published by the Ministry for Culture. On this list of significant Danish works of art, The Fall of the King was ranked alongside works by Hans Christian Andersen, Søren Kierkegaard, Karen Blixen and others.
