= Swedish Reformation and Renaissance literature =

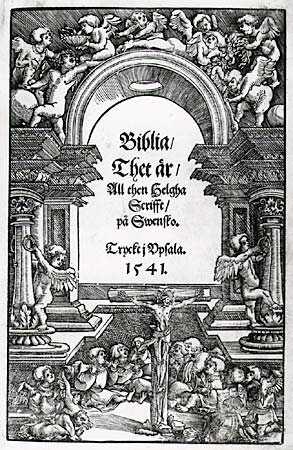
Front page of the first complete Swedish translation of the Bible in 1541, known as the Gustav Vasa Bible

The German Protestant Reformation had spread to Sweden by 1520, and resulted in the Swedish Reformation in 1527. The advent of the printing press facilitated a full translation of the Bible into Swedish in 1541. From a philological view, a new period in the development of the Swedish called Modern Swedish was initiated with the Bible translation. It also gave power to the vernacular language.

From a literary point of view, the period between 1400 and 1600 produced little of note, especially during the 1520–1600. Yet, paradoxically, the Bible translation published 1541 is possibly the most significant Swedish book of all times. First and foremost, it had a great religious impact, but apart from that it also introduced the common man to a language beyond the common-day. The Bible was used in churches for around 400 years until the Bible translation of 1917, and meanwhile translations (in 1618 and 1712) were merely revisions and corrections.

== Gothicism ==
From an ideological perspective, the 16th century literature gave rise to Gothicism. The main idea of this movement is that the Goths, a renowned East Germanic tribe in the 1st–6th century, originated from Scandinavia, and Sweden in particular. An important advocate was the deposed Swedish archbishop Johannes Magnus, who was exiled in Rome between 1530–1544 together with his brother Olaus Magnus. In Historia de omnibus gothorum suenumque regibus (1554), Johannes Magnus traced the Swedish line of kings back to the Old Testament. The works of the Magnus brothers gained attention throughout Europe and was translated into several languages, and their influence manifested itself in several works during the 17th century.

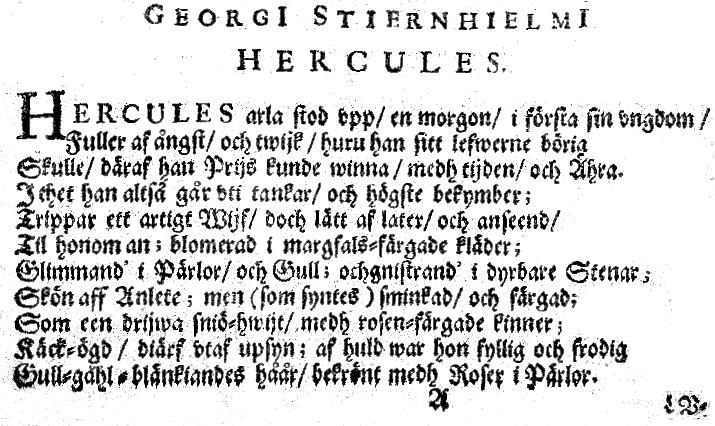
First page of the hexametric Hercules, by Georg Stiernhielm, 1658

In history, Sweden was a great empire between 1611–1718. In literature, however, its development was trailing other European countries. It was by French and German influence that Swedish literature was to be shaped. In literature, an important turnstone occurred in 1658, when Georg Stiernhielm published Hercules, a work regarded as the first Swedish work of true poetry. The story in Hercules is based on Xenophon's story of Hercules at the crossroads of different paths. It was the first known publication of hexameter in Swedish, and with it Stiernhielm proved that Swedish was up for the task. Another significant aspect of Hercules is the freedom of religious motives, drawing more upon ancient philosophy than on the Bible. In the ensuing decades, Stiernhielm and his followers made further attempts at writing tragedies, pastoral poetry and other poetic styles in Swedish.

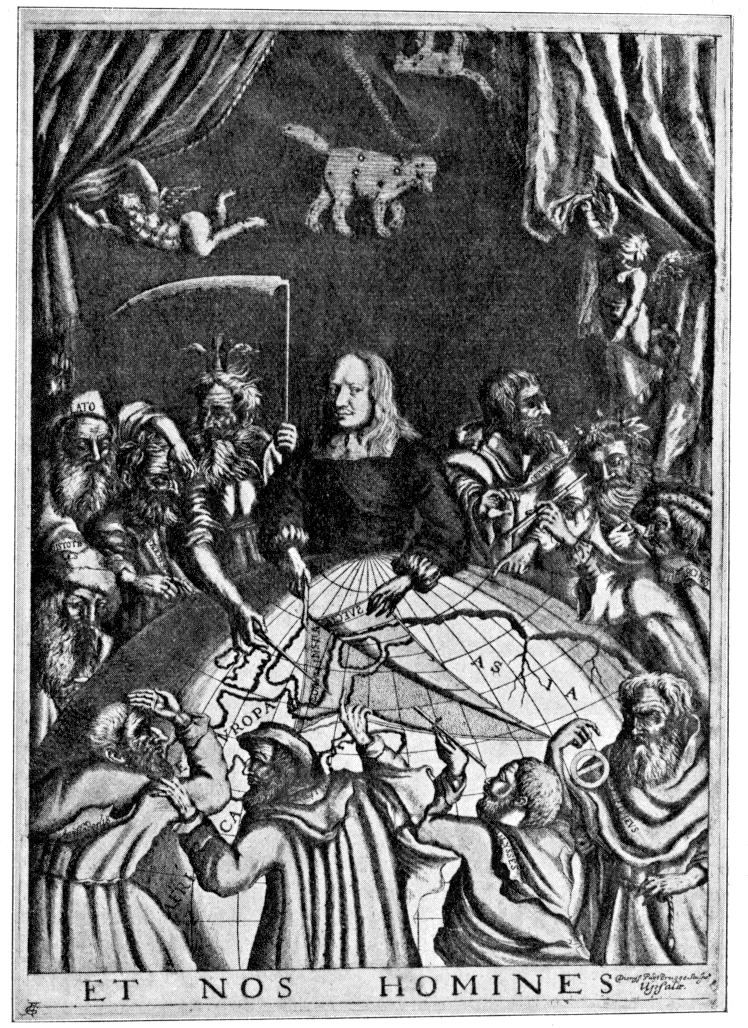
Contemporary copper engraving of Olaus Rudbeck giving a fictional lecture on the location of Atlantis

The culmination of the Gothicism came with Olaus Rudbeck's Atlantica, a massive four-volume work (1679–1702), where Rudbeck outlined how Sweden was the most ancient of all countries, and the true location of the sunken Atlantis. But when the last volume of Atlantica was published, the Gothicism movement was already on decline. This was for large part a natural reaction to the failed Swedish wars. By 1720, Gothicism was a thing of the past, and Swedish culture took a turn towards science and realism.

== Hymns ==
An ecclesiastical body of literature affected by Gothicism was the Swedish hymn production of the late 17th century. The first official Swedish hymn book was published in 1695. It is attributed to the bishop Jesper Svedberg (1653–1753), assisted by the bishop (and later archbishop) Haqvin Spegel. The hymns used an unsophisticated language to the common people, but apart from fulfilling the dire need for a uniform hymn literature, they also gave the commoners greater access to a standardized language. Svedberg was a strong advocate of the strength and high status of Swedish. In fact, he was the last strong proponent and new-thinker of his kind. The hymn book became widespread and beloved in sermons all over Sweden for a full century (the new hymn book was not published until 1819), and its weight cannot be overestimated. But the Gothicism ideals on which it was based had become superseded with the dawn of the 18th century.

== See also ==
- Category:History of Lutheranism in Sweden
- Category:Early modern history of Sweden
- Category:Swedish literature
