= Reformation in Sweden =

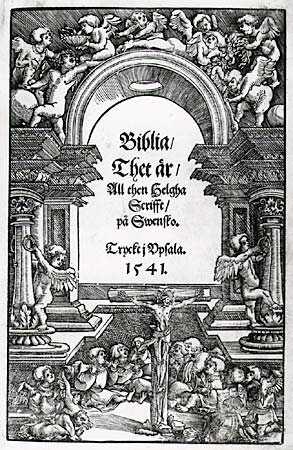
Front page of the first complete Swedish translation of the Bible in 1541, known as the Gustav Vasa Bible

The Reformation in Sweden is generally regarded as having begun in 1527 during the reign of King Gustav I of Sweden, but the process was slow and was not definitively decided until the Uppsala Synod of 1593, in the wake of an attempted Counter-Reformation during the reign of John III (1568–1592).

The Swedish Reformation caused the Church of Sweden to break with the Roman Catholic Church. It is considered to mark the end of the Swedish Middle Ages. The Reformation resulted in both Sweden and Finland becoming Protestant countries, as the latter formed an integral part of Sweden at the time.

== Background ==
Gustaf Trolle, the Catholic Archbishop of Sweden, was (with the support of the Pope Leo X) in conflict with Sten Sture the younger and Sweden's parliament, the Riksdag (the parliaments demolition of the archbishop's Almarestäket's castle in 1518). Trolle supported the Kalmar Union and was allied with Christian II who made a unionist conquest of Sweden in the autumn of 1520. Trolle was reinstated as archbishop and the Stockholm Bloodbath was carried out. Trials were held in Stockholm between 7 and 9 November 1520 that led to the immediate executions of 84 people, among them fourteen noblemen, three burgomasters, fourteen town councillors and about twenty common citizens of Stockholm were then hanged or beheaded, many of them members of the riksdag. It on the background that the pope in writing gave Trolle the right to excommunicate the parliament by canon law from the Catholic Church (and execute them) as heretics and an interdict (a suspension of sacramental rites within the country) was announced against them.

Trolle was soon forced to flee to Denmark in 1521 during the Swedish War of Liberation, where Gustav Vasa came to power in Sweden with the excommunicated parliament. Trolle also ended up on the losing side in Denmark when Frederick I of Denmark and later Christian III of Denmark deposed Christian II and took power, establishing the same poor relationship with the Pope (who stubbornly clung to Christian II and Trolle). Despite Trolle's position and his support from the Pope, Gustav Vasa refused to recognize him as archbishop and rejected Trolle as a traitor. The pressure from Rome was a contributing factor to Gustav Vasa's split from Rome and his initiation of the Reformation and Protestantism in Sweden.

But the pope did not give up either. Trolle's successor as Archbishop Johannes Magnus was not in Sweden (went to Rome). Sweden was, in practice, controlled politically and militarily entirely by the excommunicated parliament with Gustav Vasa at the helm. As interdict applied in principle to the whole of Sweden (and Denmark), the Catholic Church formally refused to authorize the regime in Sweden (and Denmark). From the perspective of the parliament and Gustav Vasa (as well as Fredrik I/Christian III), there was a concrete need to solve the problem of a striking church against the state. Lutheranism offered an alternative: a functioning church under state control. The situation in Denmark was largely the same and the Reformation in Denmark–Norway and Holstein was initiated for similar reasons as in Sweden.

== History ==
The Reformation was initiated for a number of reasons. Among these were an impractical organization, a perceived stagnation within the Catholic Church, a will toward independence from Rome, the financial needs of the state, as well as new ideas.

=== 1526–1536 ===
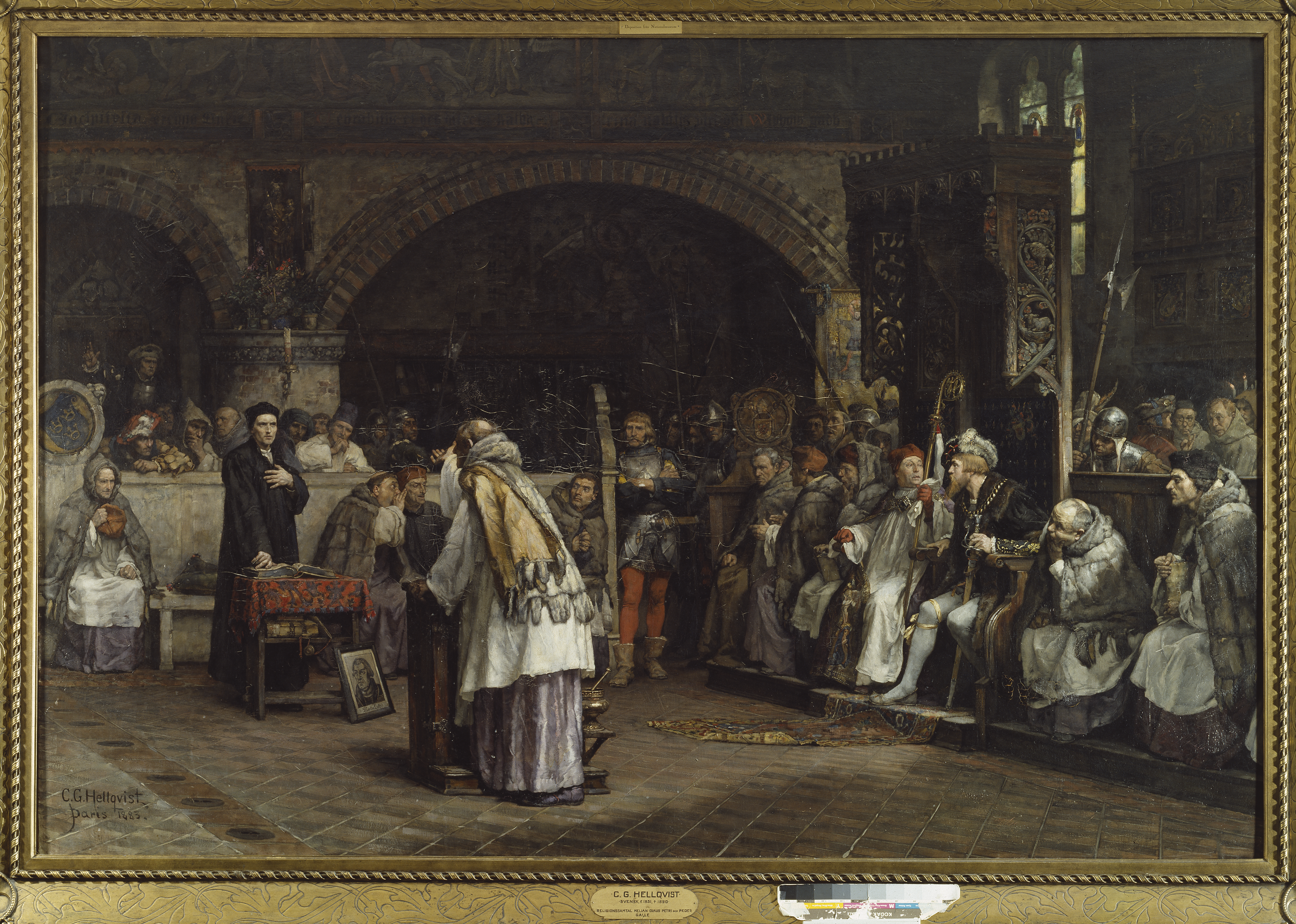
Dispute between Olaus Petri and Peder Galle, painting by Carl Gustaf Hellqvist (1883)

In 1523, King Gustav I of Sweden met the reformer Laurentius Andreae and was influenced by Protestantism, and the following year, the king broke official contacts with Rome. Laurentius Andreae introduced the king to the reformer priest Olaus Petri, who was made preacher in Storkyrkan in Stockholm. In 1525, the royal priest Olaus Petri married, effectively demonstrating the king's consent to the abolition of the celibacy of the priesthood, and providing a breach with the Catholic Church's ban of marriage of priests. In 1526, the New Testament was published in the Swedish language. In the winter of 1526, the king offered to arrange a colloquy between Olaus Petri and Catholic professor Peder Galle. Galle refused, stating church matters were not open to discussion.

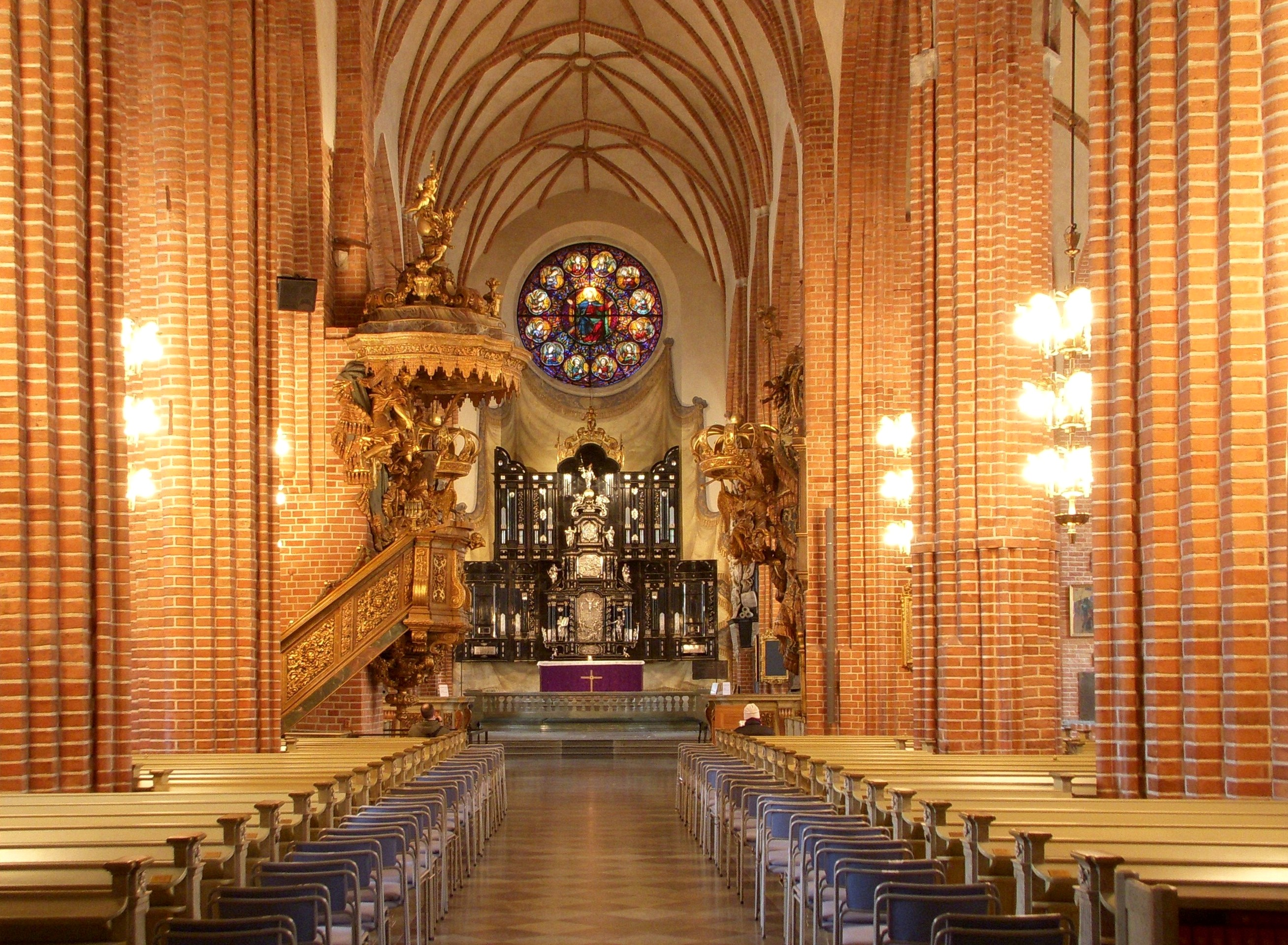
Interior of Storkyrkan in Stockholm, where Mass was celebrated in Swedish (instead of Latin), in 1525.

At the Riksdag of Västerås in 1527, referred to as the "Reformation Riksdag", the Estates agreed to a number of demands toward reformation: 1) to give the king mandate to confiscate clerical assets: 2) that all church offices were henceforth to be illegal without royal consent, in effect placing the church under royal control: 3) that the clergy were to be subjected to secular law, and finally: 4) that only the words of the Bible were to be taught in sermons in churches and schools (in effect removing all Catholic doctrines).

The Riksdag of Västerås was followed by the Reduction of Gustav I of Sweden, in which the economic demands of the monarch were met: the assets of the Catholic church were confiscated, eradicating church economic independence of the crown, thus making the clergy economically dependent of the crown. In parallel with a ban from accepting new novices, and a ban for the convents to prevent their existing members from leaving; this act indirectly resulted in the suppression of monasteries, which lost their economic foundations.

The economic reform was followed by the fulfilling of the theological demands through the Örebro Synod of 1529, in which Catholic rituals such as the veneration of saints and pilgrimages were discouraged (though not outright banned) and described as no longer a part of religious practice by the church, and the sermons of priests and monks where subjected to control of the crown (rather than the Papal church) to ensure that they were founded only on the words of the Bible (rather than doctrines of the Catholic Church), and a process toward reform in religious practice was thereby initiated. The same year, a handbook in the Swedish language was published describing the correct way of performing baptism, weddings, funerals and other religious rituals.

In 1530, the king opened a rift with Rome when he appointed Laurentius Petri Archbishop of Uppsala without Papal consent or confirmation.

Religious tensions resulted in the unsuccessful Westrogothian rebellion of the nobility and Dalecarlian rebellions of the peasantry during the 1520s and 1530s, the latter attempting to depose the king in favor of the purported son of Christina Gyllenstierna.

=== 1536–1560 ===
Until 1536, the Swedish Reformation was in essence characterized as Reform Catholicism. The final break between Sweden and Rome occurred with the abolition of the Canon law in Sweden in 1536, following the Synod of Uppsala. The entire Swedish Church was now declared independent from Rome. Between 1539–1543, the king was influenced by Conrad von Pyhy, and the Swedish Reformation was performed under a German pattern.

In 1541, the Bible was translated to Swedish, and in 1543, the New Testament also to Finnish, which is considered a great contribution to the development of each language.

During the 1540s, the religious tensions resulted in the peasant Dacke War, which also failed to defeat the monarchy.

During the "Succession Parliament" in Västerås of 1544, radical theological reforms was introduced. The Estates agreed to a number of reformation principles and altered some aspects of ritual practice, including the elimination of holy water, incense, and the adoration of saints. They also eliminated requiem masses and many holy days.

=== 1560–1568 ===
Consolidation of the Reformation continued under Eric XIV of Sweden, who came to the throne in 1560 and at first imposed not rigid doctrinal uniformity, but, rather, uniform recognition of his authority over the Church while admitting substantial numbers of Huguenot Calvinists to his kingdom. The Swedish church, however, refused Calvinism in the Synod of Stockholm of 1565.

=== 1568–1592 ===
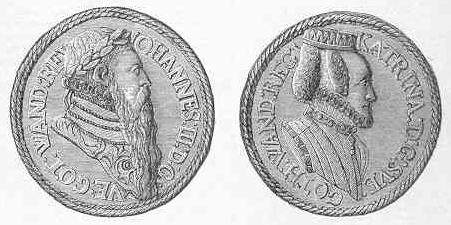
Memorial coins. King John III of Sweden and queen Catherine Jagiellon attempted to introduce a Counter-Reformation.

The reign of John III of Sweden in 1568–1592 signified certain leanings toward a Counter-Reformation in Sweden inspired by the king's Catholic wife, queen Catherine Jagiellon, who acted as a mediator in the king's negotiations with the Pope in Rome for the conditions in which Sweden would be willing to return to Catholicism.

John III leaned toward Reformed Catholicism, and suggested to Rome that Sweden, in the event of a Catholic restoration, should be allowed to keep marriage for clergy, use the Swedish language during church service, communion under both kinds, and a theology based upon the church fathers rather than upon the doctrines of the Council of Trent.

In parallel, the Swedish church introduced the Swedish Church Ordinance 1571 (accepted the following year), establishing a Swedish church doctrine. The new Protestant church ordinance was, however, given Catholic-inclined additions by the king: the Nova Ordinantia of 1575, and his own church doctrine, the Röda boken ('Red Book') of 1576, two additions which introduced a middle stance between Catholicism and Protestantism, and reintroduced many Catholic customs. The king's additions to the church ordinance were not followed in all Sweden, in particular not in the duchy belonging to his Calvinist brother Charles, as well as elsewhere where there was opposition among the clergy. These conflicting doctrines resulted in a lengthy Liturgical Struggle between Catholic and Protestant sympathizers, and a split between the king and the church.

John III and his queen also performed several other controversial Catholic-leaning acts which demonstrated their intention: in 1575, the king returned the unrestricted right to receive novices to Vadstena Abbey, which was reformed in accordance of the Council of Trent by the Jesuit Papal Legate Antonio Possevino, during which its abbess Katarina Gylta swore the Tridentine Oath, and the first Catholic Solemn Mass since the Reformation was held in the abbey. In the capital, a Catholic seminary Collegium regium Stockholmense was established by Laurentius Nicolai.

The Counter-Reformatory efforts contributed to tension in connection to the imprisoned Erik XIV, who came to be a symbol of Protestantism in prison. During the imprisonment of Eric, three major conspiracies were made to depose John III: the 1569 Plot, the Mornay Plot and the 1576 Plot, among whom at least the last one was heavily influenced by religious considerations.

The negotiations between the royal couple and Rome were ultimately not successful. Rome was not willing to accept Reformed Catholicism in exchange for Counter-Reformation, and the movement in Sweden declined after death of Catherine, which was followed by the King's remarriage to the Protestant Gunilla Bielke.

=== 1592–1600 ===
Sweden's personal union with Poland under the Catholic Sigismund III Wasa in 1592–1598 resulted in a final clash between Catholicism and Protestantism in the kingdom.

Tensions finally resulted in the Uppsala Synod of 1593, where Protestantism in accordance with the Augsburg Confession was adopted as the state religion. Catholicism was to be abandoned, the Swedish church was to return to the doctrines of the Swedish Church Ordinance 1571, and the Nova Ordinantia of 1575 and the Röda boken ('Red Book') of 1576 were to be removed from it. The suppression of the monasteries was finally completed with the closure of Vadstena Abbey in 1595.

The Protestants united under the King's uncle Duke Charles against the Catholic Sigismund and thereby the Polish-Swedish union and Catholicism, which resulted in the War against Sigismund in 1598. The war ended with the defeat of Sigismund and thereby Catholicism in Sweden, and the execution of his followers, in the Linköping Bloodbath in 1600.

== See also ==
- Swedish Reformation and Renaissance literature
