= Lindholmen Castle, Västergötland =

Coordinates: 58°36′35″N 13°04′39″E

Lindholmen Castle
- Lidköping Municipality, Sweden
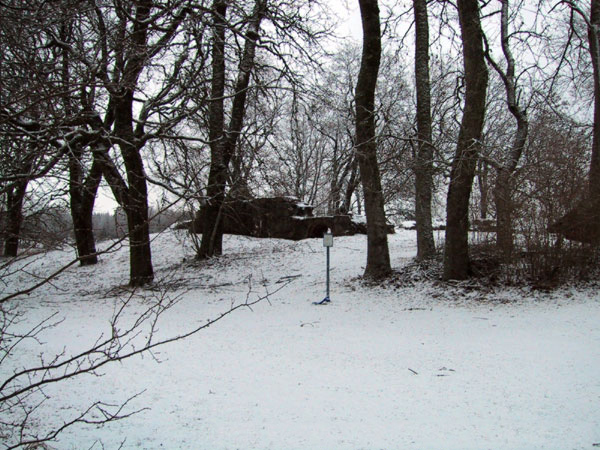
- Lindholmen Castle Ruins

Lindholmen Castle (Swedish: Lindholmens slott) is a castle ruins at Lidköping Municipality in Västra Götaland County, Sweden.

== History ==
Lindholmen was first mentioned in 1514. The property was made a manor house in 1516. Vice Admiral Bengt Gabrielsson Oxenstierna (1623–1702) rebuilt the courtyard into a large fortified castle. In 1792, the castle burned to the ground and now only a 17th-century wing remain.

== See also ==
- Lindholmen Castle
