= Colloquy (religious) =

A religious colloquy is a meeting to settle differences of doctrine or dogma, also called a colloquium (meeting, discussion), as in the historical Colloquy at Poissy, and like the legal colloquy, most often with a certain degree of judging involved. Religious colloquies are relatively common as a means to avoid calling full synods and avoiding out-and-out breaches leading to schisms.

Colloquy may also be defined as the conversation of prayer with God, a private opportunity with God the Father, to plead one's need for assistance, reassurance or forgiveness. St. Gregory of Nyssa is quoted as saying "Prayer is conversation, and colloquy with God."
