= Conrad von Pyhy =

First Lord High Chancellor of Sweden

Conrad von Pyhy (né Peutinger; c. 1500 – 1553) was a Swedish statesman of German descent, originally from Frankfurt am Main. He served as Lord High Chancellor of Sweden from 1538 to 1543. He fell in disgrace in 1543 and was imprisoned at Västerås Castle, where he died in 1553.
