= Riksråd =

Councils that ruled Scandinavian countries in the Middle Ages

Riksrådet (in Norwegian and Swedish) or Rigsrådet (in Danish) (in English: the Council of the Realm and the Council of the State – sometimes translated as the "Privy Council") is the name of the councils of the Scandinavian countries that ruled the countries together with the kings from late Middle Ages to the 17th century. Norway had a Council of the Realm (Riksrådet) that was de facto abolished by the Danish-Norwegian king in 1536–1537. In Sweden the parallel Council gradually came under the influence of the king during the 17th century.

== Rigsrådet in Denmark ==
The members of the Council of Denmark seem to have developed from being councillors of the king to being representatives of the magnates and noblemen. From the 1320s it clearly appears as a force, and from the 1440s it was the permanent opponent of royal power, replacing the Danehof.

The Council consisted of noblemen who were appointed either by the king or their peers on the council. Until the 1536 Reformation, bishops were automatically members. So were the supreme officials (today the "cabinet ministers") while lower ranking "ministers" did not have any formal right to membership. The "backbenchers" of the council took part in daily negotiations of problems and administration, voted, and took on diplomatic tasks. Most of them were squires who also had to look after their lands.

As a whole, it was the role of the council to rule together with the king, to control him, and to manage the affairs of State well. The councillors were seen as a guarantee towards the nobility (and in theory also towards "the people") that everything was done right. The Council took over the rule in the space that appeared by a succession or at interregna. It led negotiations over the creation of a new haandfæstning, and in theory it also had to call for a rebellion against kings who did not keep their promises, a right that was used in 1523. However, in the 16th century, it was not quite unusual that the councillors to some degree identified with the State rejecting too extravagant demands from the Danish gentry. The background of this normally was that they themselves represented the Danish answer to the peerage.

The number of councillors was not laid down. Normally it was about 20, but from time to time deaths might reduce their number wherefore it was supplied by mass creations. Not until 1648 was the number of councillors finally fixed to 23.

The authority of the council was indisputable, and within some limits the kings also tried to co-operate. However most of the kings neglected some of the rules and, for instance, foreign questions presented many loopholes. The many military defeats of the 17th century and especially growing economic problems and conservatism of the nobility also weakened the prestige of the council, and the king gradually tried to strengthen his own influence. At the introduction of absolute monarchy in 1660, the council was abolished.

The word Rigsråd was revived in Denmark in the 19th century. During 1854–1866 it was used for a special federal council dealing with all common legislative questions of Denmark and Schleswig-Holstein, and from 1863 of Denmark and Schleswig alone. It had hardly anything else in common with its old namesake other than the title. (The world's first use of the Single transferable vote in an election of legislators was seen in the 1855 Rigsrad election.) The loss of Schleswig in 1864 made the Rigsrad redundant, and it was abolished by the new constitution two years later.

== Riksrådet in Norway ==
The Norwegian Riksråd gradually emerged around 1300, evolving from the King's council. It emerged clearly as a power factor after 1319, during the minority of King Magnus VII Eriksson. There do not seem to have been any clear rules for how many members the council should have, or who should be councillors. During the 15th century, the number could be from 30 to 40, whereas after 1500 it was barely above ten. The Norwegian bishops were automatically members. There were at the time five bishops in mainland Norway (the archbishop in Trondheim, the bishops in Oslo, Hamar, Stavanger, Bergen), as well as one in the Faroe Islands, two on Iceland, one in Greenland, and one in Orkney (lost to Scotland in 1468). The bishops from the islands rarely participated in the Norwegian Riksråd. In addition, the chaplains of the royal chapels in Oslo and Bergen were permanent members. So were the commanders of the five strongest castles of Norway: Bohus, Akershus in Oslo, the castles in Bergen, Tønsberg and Trondheim. The rest of the council was recruited from the Norwegian nobility. Only Norwegians were eligible for these places in the Norwegian Riksråd – however, the eligibility extended also to include foreigners who had married a Norwegian. As several of the bishops and commanders of the castles were foreigners – mostly Danish, but also some Swedish – the number of Norwegians in the Norwegian Riksråd gradually diminished. The archbishop of Trondheim mostly acted as the head of the council.

As Norway had of old been a hereditary kingdom, the Norwegian Riksråd's task did not originally include the election of the king, as was the case in Sweden and Denmark. However, as successive kings died without leaving any issue, starting with Olav IV in 1387, it fell to the Riksråd to interpret the succession laws. This it did so freely that Norway more and more became, in reality, an elected monarchy, like its Nordic neighbours. This was formally affirmed in 1450, when Christian I of Denmark took the Norwegian throne as an elected monarch. On his death, in 1481, the Riksråd ruled the country for two years, in an interregnum, before electing Christian's son as the new king – a period which could be seen as the height of the council's power.

In the early 16th century, the power of the Norwegian council diminished. The Oldenburg union kings conducted a policy of strengthening their own power at the cost of the nobility, and the Norwegian nobility was too weak to put up a strong opposition. In addition, the few Norwegian noble families became more and more intermarried with the Danish nobility, giving them less of an interest in maintaining separate Norwegian structures. During the troubled transition to the reign of King Christian III, the Norwegian archbishop Olav Engelbrektsson led a rebellion in support of Christian's rival to the throne. After Christian had won, the Norwegian Riksråd was de facto abolished, in 1536–1537. The archbishop went into exile, the Protestant reformation was carried through in Denmark and Norway, and the Norwegian Riksråd never assembled again.

== Riksrådet in Sweden ==
The Riksråd was the upper parliamentary house in Sweden populated by the nobility. The Swedish nobility often played a prominent role in Swedish history, which both helped and hindered the nation. Sten Sture of the Riksråd led the resistance against the Kalmar Union until he was killed in battle in the beginning of 1520. After the Stockholm bloodbath in November 1520, when around 90 nobles were executed by the union monarch Christian II, the Swedish nobleman Gustav Vasa took over the resistance and successfully led Sweden out of the union in 1523.

Over the next two centuries the Monarchy and the Riksråd were constant rivals. When Sigismund was crowned in 1594 the Riksråd drafted the Charter of Nyköping which took many of the king's powers. During Queen Christina of Sweden's reign a large proportion of crown land was alienated (given to nobles) which led to major financial instability in Sweden.

King Charles XI was Sweden's first absolute monarch who led an immense 'reduction' policy (the retrieval of land from the nobility). In 1654 1.5% of land was the Crown's and 72% belonged to the nobility. By 1700, 35.5% of land belonged to the Crown and 33% belonged to the nobility. This continued until the end of the Swedish absolutists in 1718 when Charles XII was killed during the Great Northern War.

The Privy Council, Riksråd, officially was the ruling body of Sweden until 1974.
