= Stockholm Bloodbath =

1520 trial and executions

Coordinates: 59°19′30″N 18°04′15″E

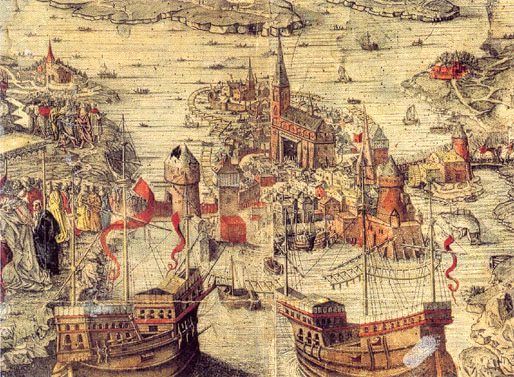
The executions as depicted in Blodbadsplanschen (1524)

The Stockholm Bloodbath (Swedish: Stockholms blodbad) was a trial that led to a series of executions in Stockholm between 7 and 9 November 1520. The event is also known as the Stockholm massacre. The events occurred after the coronation of Christian II as the new king of Sweden, when guests in the crowning party were invited to a meeting at Tre Kronor castle. Archbishop Gustav Trolle, demanding economic compensation for things such as the demolition of Almarestäket's fortress, questioned whether the former Swedish regent Sten Sture the Younger and his supporters had been guilty of heresy.

Supported by canon law, nearly 100 people were executed in the days following the meeting despite promises of amnesty. Among those killed were many people from the aristocracy who had been supporting the Sture party in the previous years. Thereafter King Christian II became known in Sweden as Kristian Tyrann ("Christian [the] Tyrant").

== Background ==
=== Political factions in Sweden ===
The Stockholm Bloodbath was a consequence of conflict between Swedish pro-unionists (in favour of the Kalmar Union, then dominated by Denmark) and anti-unionists (supporters of Swedish independence), and also between the anti-unionists and the Danish aristocracy, which in other aspects was opposed to King Christian. The anti-unionist party was headed by Sten Sture the Younger, and the pro-unionist party by the Archbishop Gustavus Trolle.

=== Military interventions of King Christian ===
King Christian, who had already taken measures to isolate Sweden politically, intervened to help Archbishop Trolle, who was under siege in his fortress at Stäket. However, he was defeated by Sture and his peasant soldiers at Vedila, and forced to return to Denmark. A second attempt to bring Sweden back under his control in 1518 was also countered by Sture's victory at Brännkyrka. Eventually, a third attempt made in 1520 with a large army of French, German and Scottish mercenaries proved successful.

Sture was mortally wounded at the Battle of Bogesund on 19 January 1520. The Danish army, unopposed, was approaching Uppsala, where the members of the Swedish Riksdag of the Estates had already assembled. The senators agreed to render homage to Christian, on condition that he give a full amnesty for past actions and a guarantee that Sweden should be ruled according to Swedish laws and customs. A convention to this effect was confirmed by the king and the Danish Privy Council on 31 March. Sture's widow, Lady Kristina, was still resisting in Stockholm with support from the peasants of central Sweden, and defeated the Danes at Balundsås on 19 March. Eventually, her forces were defeated at Uppsala (långfredagsslaget vid Uppsala) on Good Friday, 6 April.

In May, the Danish fleet, led by King Christian, arrived and Stockholm was attacked by land and sea. Lady Kristina resisted for four months longer, and in the beginning of autumn Kristina's forces began winning. The inhabitants of Stockholm had a large supply of food and fared relatively well. Christian realized that his stockpile was dwindling and that it would doom his army to maintain the siege throughout the winter. With the help of Bishop Mattias, Hemming Gadh and other Swedes of high stature, Christian sent a proposal for retreat that was very advantageous for the Swedes. During a meeting on what is thought to be Beckholmen, outside of Djurgården, Christian swore that all acts against him would be forgotten, and gave pardon to several named persons (including Gustav Vasa, who had escaped from Denmark, where he had been held hostage). Lady Kristina would be given Hörningsholm and all Mörkön as a fief, and was also promised Tavastehus (Hämeenlinna) in Finland. When this had been written down on paper, the mayor of the city delivered the keys to the city on Södermalm and Christian held his grand entry. Shortly after, he sailed back to Denmark, to return in October for his coronation.

== Massacre ==
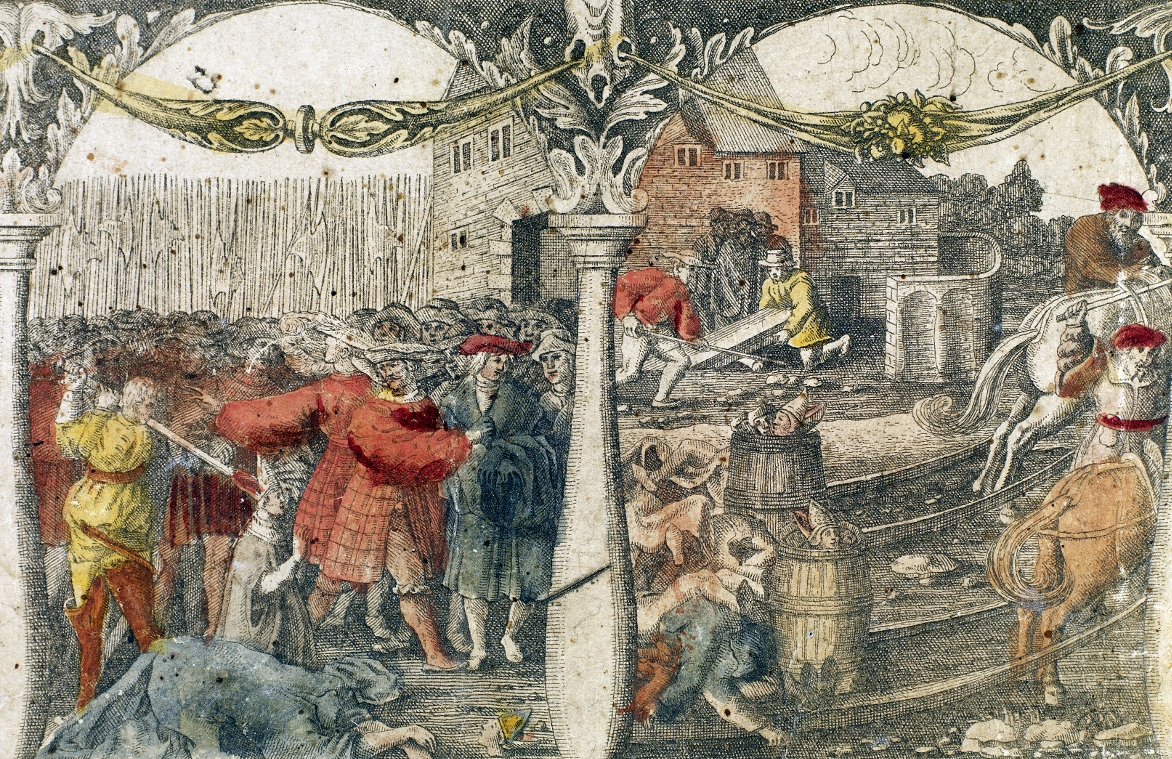
Stockholm Bloodbath

On 4 November, Christian was anointed by Gustavus Trolle in Storkyrkan Cathedral and took the usual oath to rule the kingdom through native-born Swedes only. A banquet was held for the next three days. Lots of wine and beer was drunk and jokes were cracked between Danes and Swedes.

On the evening of 7 November, Christian summoned many Swedish leaders to a private conference at the palace. At dusk on 8 November, Danish soldiers, with lanterns and torches, entered a great hall of the royal palace and imprisoned several noble guests. Later in the evening, even more of the king's guests were imprisoned. All these people had previously been marked down on Archbishop Trolle's proscription list.

The following day, 9 November, a council, headed by Archbishop Trolle, sentenced the proscribed to death for being heretics; the main point of accusation was their having united in a pact to depose Trolle a few years earlier. However, many of them were also leading men of the Sture party and thus potential opponents of the Danish kings. At noon, the anti-unionist bishops of Skara and Strängnäs were led out into the great square and beheaded. Fourteen noblemen, three burgomasters, fourteen town councillors and about twenty common citizens of Stockholm were then hanged or beheaded.

The executions continued throughout the following day (10 November). According to the chief executioner, Jörgen Homuth, 82 people were executed. It has been claimed that Christian also took revenge on Sten Sture's body, having it dug up and burnt, as well as the body of his child. Sture's widow Lady Kristina and many other noblewomen were taken as prisoners to Denmark.

== Aftermath ==
Christian justified the massacre in a proclamation to the Swedish people as a measure necessary to avoid a papal interdict, but, when apologising to the Pope for the decapitation of the bishops, he blamed his troops for performing unauthorised acts of vengeance.

Gustav Vasa was a son of Erik Johansson, one of the victims of the executions. Vasa, upon hearing of the massacre, travelled north to the province of Dalarna to seek support for a new revolt. The population, informed of what had happened, rallied to his side. They were ultimately able to defeat Christian's forces in the Swedish War of Liberation. The massacre became the catalyst that permanently separated Sweden from Denmark.

== Later reception and propaganda ==
The Stockholm Bloodbath precipitated a lengthy hostility towards Danes in Sweden, and from then on the two nations were almost continuously hostile toward each other. These hostilities, developing into a struggle for hegemony in the Scandinavian and North German area, lasted for nearly three hundred years. Memory of the Bloodbath served to let Swedes depict themselves (and often, actually regard themselves) as the wronged and aggrieved party, even when they were the ones who eventually took the political and military lead, such as the conquest and annexation of Scania until the Treaty of Roskilde in 1658.

=== Christian the Tyrant and spurious "Christian the Good" ===
The event earned Christian II the nickname of Kristian Tyrann (Christian [the] Tyrant) in Sweden, which is retained in the present day. It is a common misconception in Sweden that King Christian II is given the contrary byname Christian den Gode (Christian the Good) in Denmark, but this is apocryphal.

According to Danish historians, no bynames have been given to Christian II in Danish historical tradition. In an interview with Gunnar Richardson in 1979, Danish historian Mikael Venge, author of the article about Christian II in Dansk Biografisk Leksikon said: "I think you ought to protest the next time the Swedish radio claims anything so utterly unfounded that could be understood as if the Danes approved of the Stockholm bloodbath." Despite this, even today, tourist guides in Stockholm spice up their guiding of the Old Town (Gamla Stan) with the news about Christian II's "rehabilitation" back in Denmark.

== In fiction ==
The Stockholm Bloodbath has been depicted in several pieces of fiction:

- The event is depicted in the 1901 novel Kongens Fald (The Fall of the King), by Nobel Laureate Johannes V. Jensen.
- The bloodbath forms a large part of the 1948 historical novel The Adventurer (original title Mikael Karvajalka) by the Finnish writer Mika Waltari. The events are depicted as seen by Mikael Karvajalka, a young Finn in Stockholm at the time.
- A number of references to the Stockholm Bloodbath appear in Freddy's Book (1980) by American novelist John Gardner.
- A 2005 book Bruden fra Gent (translated in Nl. De Gentse Bruid, or The Bride From Ghent) by the Danish writer Dorrit Willumsen, referenced these events. It illuminates the life of Christian II as seen from his relationship with his mistress, the Dutch Dyveke, and his wife Isabella of Austria, sister of Charles the Fifth..
- The event is the subject of the 2023 film Stockholm Bloodbath directed by Mikael Håfström which depicts the events with dark comedy overtones.

== See also ==
- Kalmar Union
- Sten Sture the Younger
- Swedish War of Liberation
- Sture Murders
- Åbo Bloodbath
- Linköping Bloodbath

== Sources ==
- Wolke, Lars Ericson (2006) Stockholms blodbad (Stockholm: Prisma) ISBN 91-518-4380-3
- Larsson, Lars-Olof (2003) Kalmarunionens tid, Bokförlaget Prisma (Stockholm: Andra upplagan) ISBN 91-518-4217-3.
- Weibull, Lauritz (1949) Nordisk historia. Forskningar och undersökningar. Del III. Från Erik den helige till Karl XII, Natur & Kultur Stockholm ISBN 9968-04-746-5.
- Harrison, Dick (2002) Sveriges historia. Medeltiden (Stockholm: Liber) ISBN 91-47-05115-9.
- Harrison, Dick (1997) Uppror och allianser. Politiskt våld i 1400-talets svenska bondesamhälle (Lund: Historiska institutionen); ISBN 91-85057-37-1.
