= Anna Bülow =

Anna Fickesdotter (Bülow), (died 1519), was a Swedish writer and translator and abbess of the Bridgittine Vadstena Abbey between 1501–1519.

Anna Fickesdotter Bülow was elected abbess of Vadstena convent in 1501 and held that position for eighteen years, until her death. She was active in literary matters and was widely reputed and respected for her learning. She ordered the translation of the suffering of Christ, the life of John, and the predictions of Saint Elizabeth of Hungary.

Her Cronicum Genealogicum was printed by Johan Peringskiöld in 1718.

Religious titles
Preceded by Margareta Thuresdotter	Abbess of Vadstena; 1501-1519	Succeeded by Anna Germundsdotter
