= Anna Germundsdotter =

Anna Germundsdotter or Girmundsdotter (Latin; Anna Germundi, died 23 March 1538) was a Swedish nun of the Bridgettine order and writer. She served as abbess of Vadstena Abbey from 1518 until 1529.

== Life ==
Anna Germundsdotter was from Söderköping and the maternal niece of Ingemund Petrusson, canon of the Linköping Cathedral. She entered Vadstena Abbey in 1489. She was the author of the Codex Holm. A 3, a list documenting the rules of the abbey, from 1502.

In 1518, she was elected abbess by a majority of votes from the monks but a minority of votes from the nuns of the double convent, but the bishop granted her the election victory and had her installed as abbess. She hosted king Christian II of Denmark in 1521.

In circa 1526, the famous scandal about Liten Agda och Olof Tyste was to have taken place at the abbey, and the following year, when the Swedish Reformation was introduced, king Gustav I of Sweden gave instructions to the abbess through Bishop Hans Brask, with reference to the scandalous elopement of the nun Agda, who had been placed in the abbey against her will, with her lover Olof, that no-one should be allowed to become a nun at the abbey in the future without permission from the monarch. The existing members were also given royal permission to leave the convent if the wished to do so: some of the younger nuns made use of this permit, and the abbess Anna Germundsdotter was forbidden to stop them.

In 1529, two monks and their confessor attended the Örebro Synod, and was noted to have changed their sympathies to the Protestant reformers. The same year, Anna Germundsdotter chose to resign as abbess and retire as an ordinary member of the convent.

== Notes ==
Religious titles
| Preceded by Anna Bülow | Abbess of Vadstena; 1518-1529 | Succeeded by Katarina Eriksdotter |
