= Elizabeth of Hungary =

Hungarian princess and Christian saint

Saint Elizabeth of Hungary TOSF
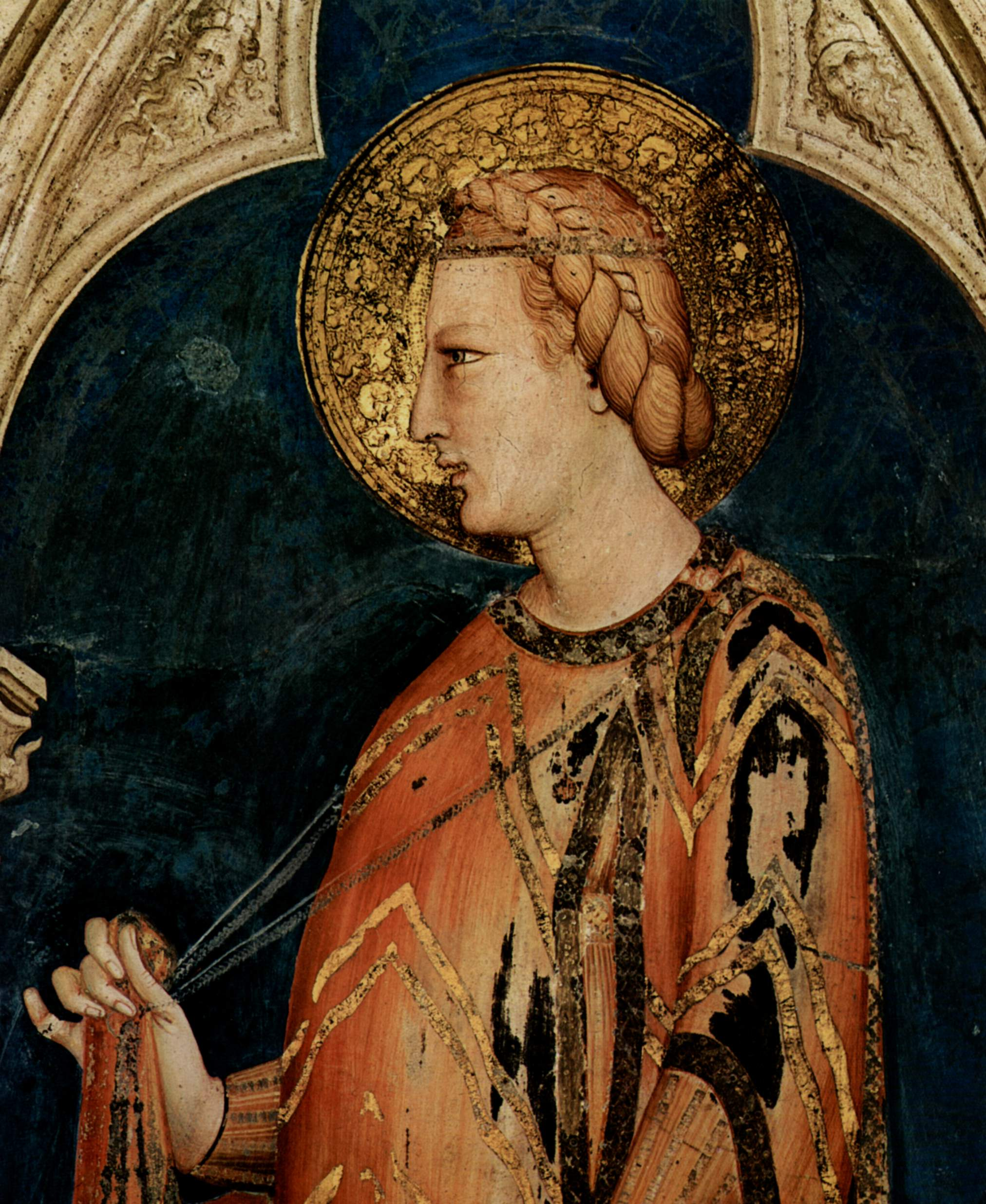
- Elizabeth of Hungary by Simone Martini

Confessor
- Born: 7 July 1207; Pozsony, Kingdom of Hungary (modern-day Bratislava, Slovakia)
- Died: 17 November 1231 (aged 24); Marburg, Landgraviate of Thuringia, Holy Roman Empire (modern-day Hesse, Germany)
- Venerated in: Catholic Church; Anglican Communion; Lutheranism
- Canonized: 27 May 1235, Perugia, Italy by Pope Gregory IX
- Major shrine: St Elisabeth Cathedral, Košice, Slovakia; St. Elizabeth Church, Marburg, Germany
- Feast: 17 November; 19 November (General Roman Calendar of 1960)
- Attributes: Roses, crown, food basket
- Patronage: hospitals; nurses; falsely accused people; bakers; brides; countesses; dying children; exiles; homeless people; lace-makers; widows; Bogotá, Colombia; Archdiocese of Bogotá; Archdiocese of Jaro; Teutonic Order; Third Order of Saint Francis; Budapest, Hungary and Košice, Slovakia

Elizabeth of Hungary (German: Heilige Elisabeth von Thüringen, Hungarian: Árpád-házi Szent Erzsébet, Slovak: Svätá Alžbeta Uhorská; 7 July 1207 – 17 November 1231), also known as Elisabeth of Thuringia, was a princess of the Kingdom of Hungary and the landgravine of Thuringia.

Elizabeth was married at the age of 14, and widowed at 20. After her husband's death, she regained her dowry, using the money to build a hospital where she herself served the sick. She became a symbol of Christian charity after her death in 1231 at the age of 24 and was canonized on 25 May 1235. She is venerated as a saint by the Catholic Church. She was an early member of the Third Order of St. Francis, and is today honored as its patroness.

== Early life and marriage ==
Elizabeth was the daughter of King Andrew II of Hungary and Gertrude of Merania. Her mother's sister was Saint Hedwig of Andechs, wife of Henry the Bearded, Duke of Silesia and of Poland.

According to tradition, she was born in Hungary, possibly in the castle of Sárospatak, on 7 July 1207. However, a sermon printed in 1497 by the Franciscan friar Osvaldus de Lasco, a church official in Hungary, is the first source to specifically name Sárospatak as Elizabeth's birthplace, perhaps building on local tradition. Osvaldus also translates the miracle of the roses to Elizabeth's childhood in Sárospatak and has her leave Hungary at the age of five.

According to a different tradition she was born in Pozsony, Hungary (present-day Bratislava, Slovakia), where she lived in the Castle of Posonium until the age of four. Elizabeth was brought to the court of the rulers of Thuringia in central Germany, to be betrothed to Louis IV, Landgrave of Thuringia (also known as Ludwig IV), a future union which would reinforce political alliances between the two families. (Note: Some, however (see the Catholic Encyclopedia), have suggested that Ludwig's brother Hermann was in fact the eldest, and that she was first betrothed to him until his death in 1232, but this is doubtful. An event of this magnitude would almost certainly be mentioned at least once in the many original sources at our disposal, and this is not the case. Rather, the 14th-century Cronica Reinhardsbrunnensis specifically names Hermann as the second son. In addition, the only contemporary document (dated 29 May 1214) that might support Hermann's claim to be the eldest by putting his name before that of Louis relates to a monastery in Hesse. This, it has been suggested, actually supports the claim that Hermann was the younger of the two, as Hesse was traditionally the domain of the second son, and thus it would be normal that his name be mentioned first, as this document deals with his territory.) She was raised by the Thuringian court and would have been familiar with the local language and culture.

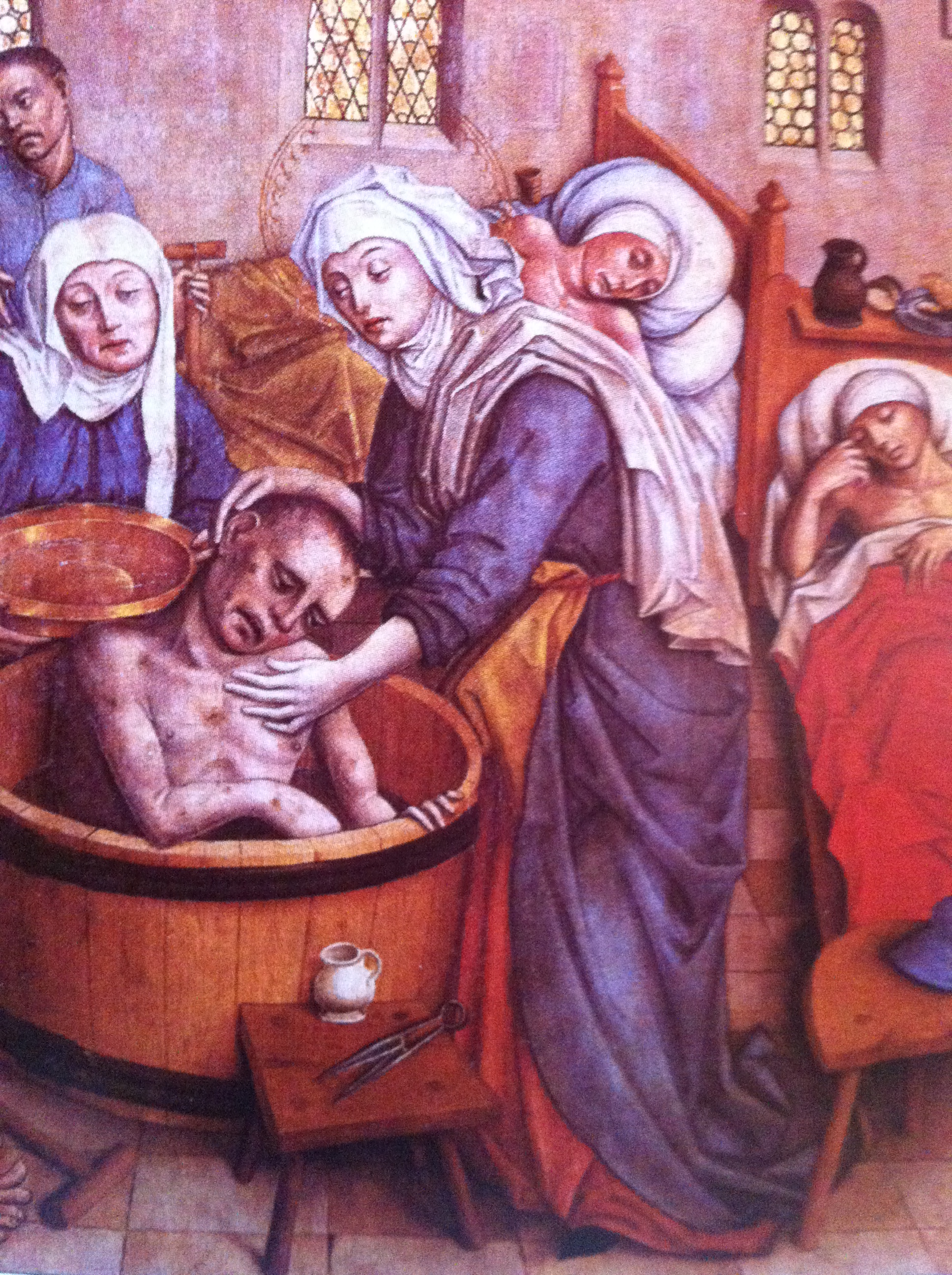
St. Elizabeth washing a sick man—a scene from the main altar of St. Elisabeth Cathedral in Košice, 15th century

In 1221, at the age of fourteen, Elizabeth married Louis; the same year he was enthroned as landgrave, and the marriage appears to have been happy.

=== Religious inclinations, influences ===
In 1223, Franciscan friars arrived, and the teenage Elizabeth not only learned about the ideals of Francis of Assisi, but started to live them. Louis was not upset by his wife's charitable efforts, believing that the distribution of his wealth to the poor would bring eternal reward; he is venerated in Thuringia as a saint, though he was never canonized by the church.

It was also about this time that the priest and later inquisitor Konrad von Marburg gained considerable influence over Elizabeth when he was appointed as her confessor. In the spring of 1226, when floods, famine and plague wrought havoc in Thuringia, Louis, a staunch supporter of the Hohenstaufen Frederick II, Holy Roman Emperor, represented Frederick II at the Imperial Diet held in Cremona.

Elizabeth assumed control of affairs at home and distributed alms in all parts of their territory, even giving away state robes and ornaments to the poor.

== Widowhood ==
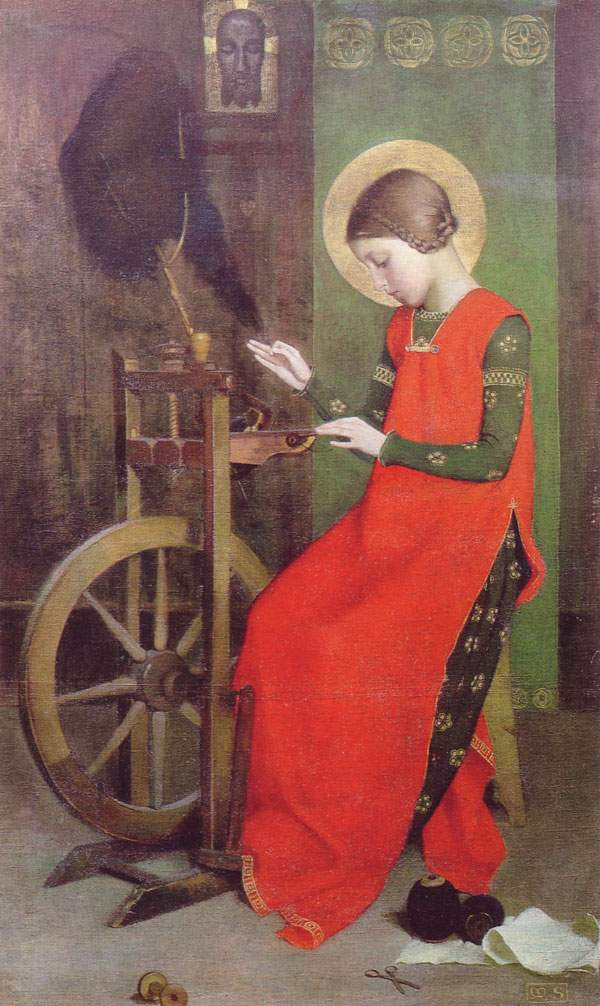
St. Elizabeth spinning wool for the poor by Marianne Stokes (1895)

Elizabeth's life changed irrevocably on 11 September 1227 when Louis, en route to join the Sixth Crusade, died of a fever in Otranto, Italy, just a few weeks before the birth of her daughter Gertrude. Upon hearing the news of her husband's death, the 20-year-old Elizabeth reportedly said, "He is dead. He is dead. It is to me as if the whole world died today." His remains were returned to Elizabeth in 1228 and entombed at the abbey of Reinhardsbrunn.

After Louis' death, his brother, Henry Raspe, assumed the regency during the minority of Elizabeth's eldest child, Hermann (1222–1241). After bitter arguments over the disposal of her dowry—a conflict in which Konrad was appointed as the official Defender of her case by Pope Gregory IX—Elizabeth left the court at Wartburg and moved to Marburg in Hesse. Her move seems to have been partly influenced by Konrad's strict dietary commands, which could not be met at Wartburg.

Following her husband's death, Elizabeth made solemn vows to Konrad similar to those of a nun. These vows included celibacy, as well as complete obedience to Konrad as her confessor and spiritual director. Konrad's treatment of Elizabeth was extremely harsh, and he held her to standards of behavior which were almost impossible to meet. Among the punishments he is alleged to have ordered were physical beatings; he also ordered her to send away her three children. Her pledge to celibacy proved a hindrance to her family's political ambitions. Elizabeth was more or less held hostage at Pottenstein, the castle of her uncle, Bishop Ekbert of Bamberg, in an effort to force her to remarry. Elizabeth, however, held fast to her vow, even threatening to cut off her own nose so that no man would find her attractive enough to marry.

Elizabeth's second child Sophie of Thuringia (1224–1275) married Henry II, Duke of Brabant, and was the ancestress of the Landgraves of Hesse, since in the War of the Thuringian Succession she won Hesse for her son Heinrich I, called the Child. Elizabeth's third child, Gertrude of Altenberg (1227–1297), was born several weeks after the death of her father; she became abbess of the monastery of Altenberg Abbey, Hesse near Wetzlar.

Elizabeth built a hospital at Marburg for the poor and the sick with the money from her dowry, where she and her companions cared for them.

== The Miracles ==
=== Miracle of the roses ===
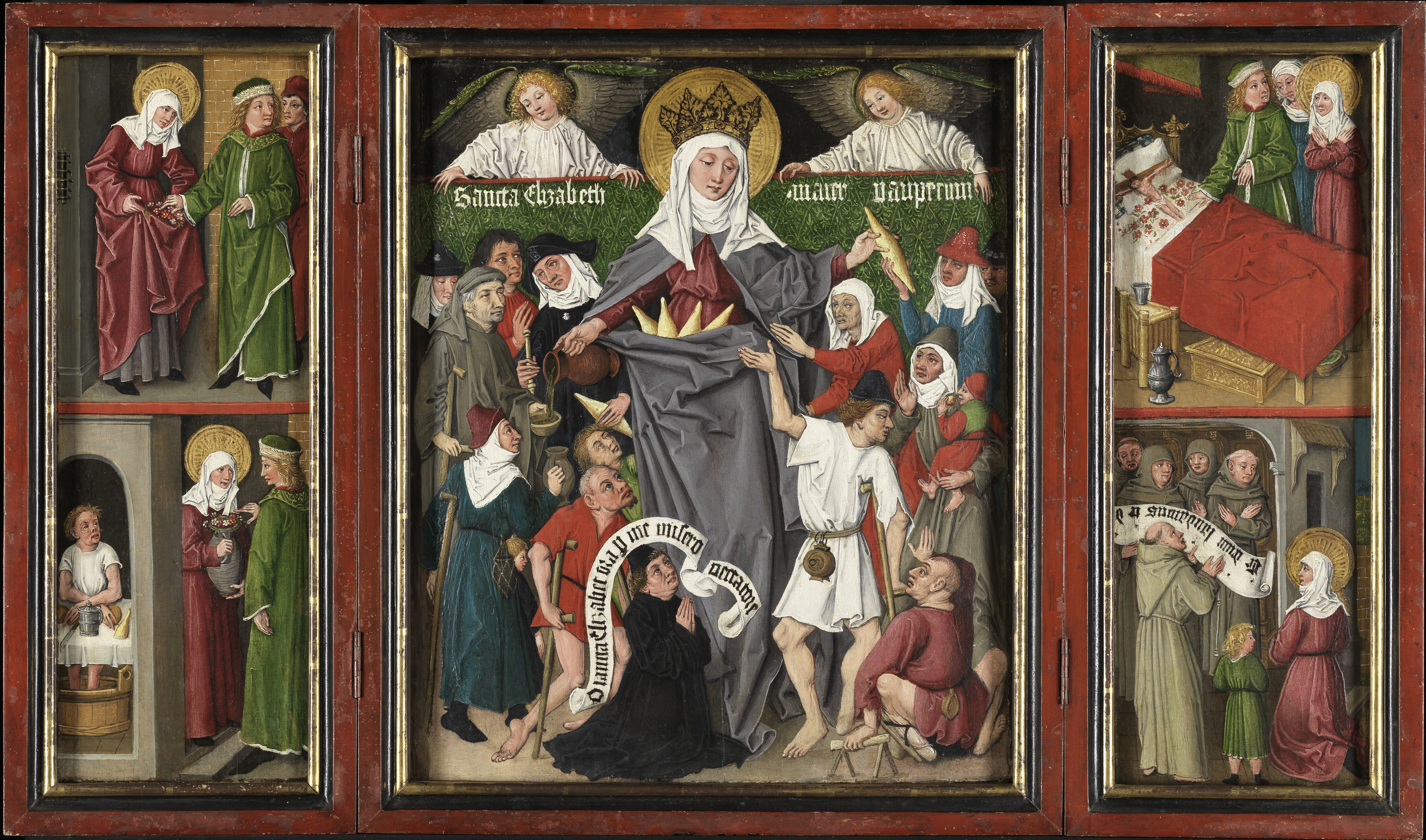
A triptych depicting the miracles and her charity (Master of the Drapery Studies c. 1480-90)

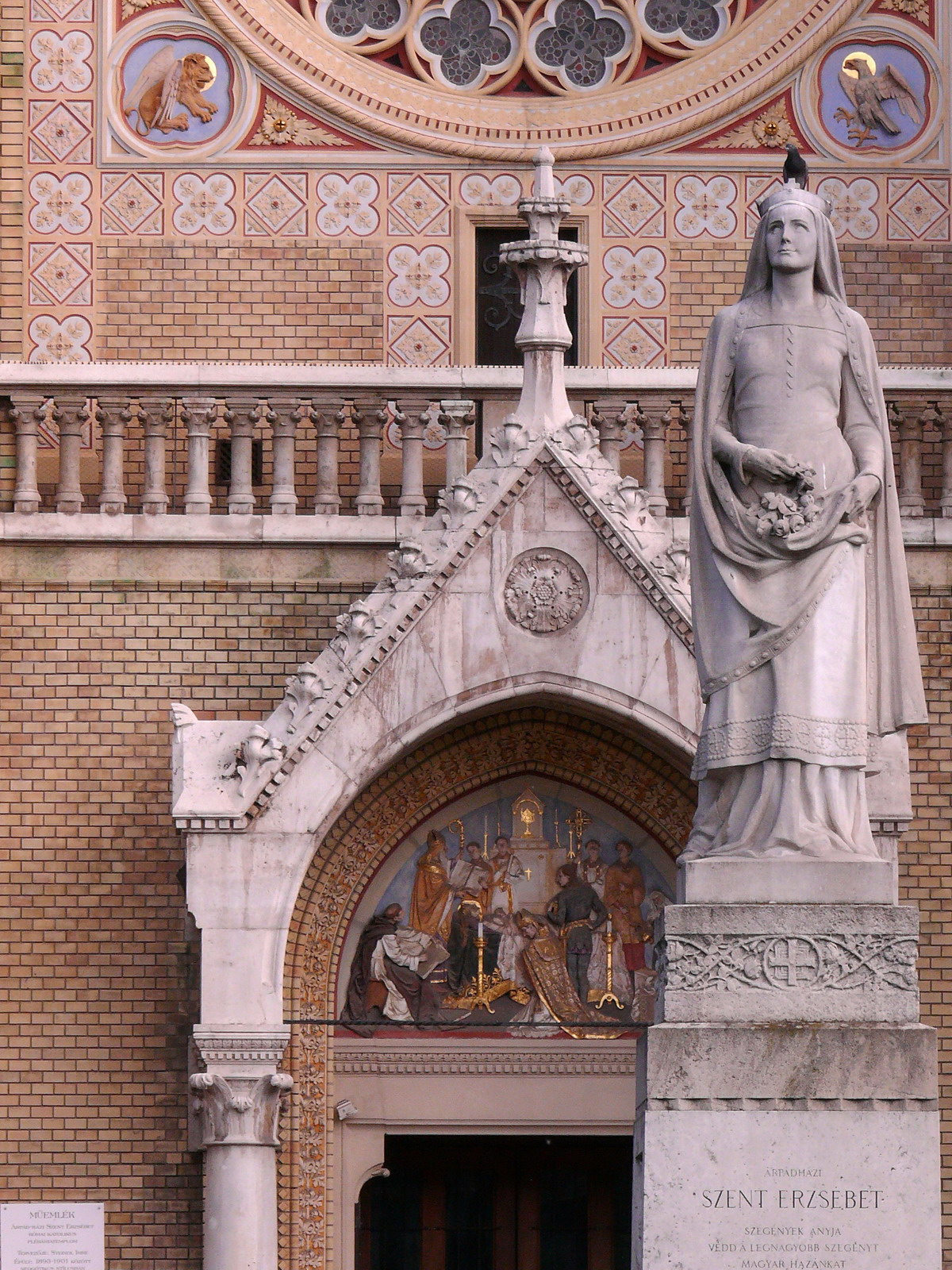
A statue showing the miracle of the roses in the rose garden in front of the neo-Gothic church dedicated to her at Roses' Square (Rózsák tere), Budapest

The popular legend of the miracle of the roses was originally attributed to Elizabeth of Portugal, is absent from Elizabeth of Thuringia's earliest hagiography and was only later attributed to the latter. It also appears in that of many other saints.

The version attributing it to Elizabeth of Hungary states that, while taking bread to the poor in secret, she met her husband Louis with a hunting party (or in some versions Louis' brother Heinrich Raspe). To quell suspicions of the gentry that she was stealing treasure from the castle, he asked her to reveal what was hidden under her cloak. In that moment, her cloak fell open and a vision of white and red roses could be seen, which proved to Louis that God's protecting hand was at work. However, this contradicts her vitae, which state that her husband was never troubled by her charity and always supported it.

=== Christ in the bed ===
Another story told of Elizabeth, also found in Dietrich of Apolda's Vita, relates how she laid the leper Helias of Eisenach in the bed she shared with her husband. Her mother-in-law, who was horrified, told this immediately to Louis on his return. When Louis removed the bedclothes in great indignation, at that instant "Almighty God opened the eyes of his soul, and instead of a leper he saw the figure of Christ crucified stretched upon the bed." This story also appears in Franz Liszt's oratorio about Elizabeth.

== Death and legacy ==
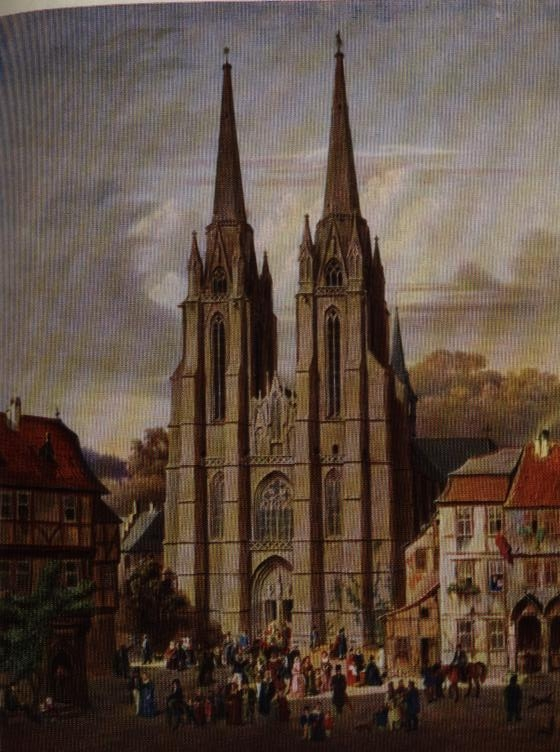
Elisabethkirche in Marburg

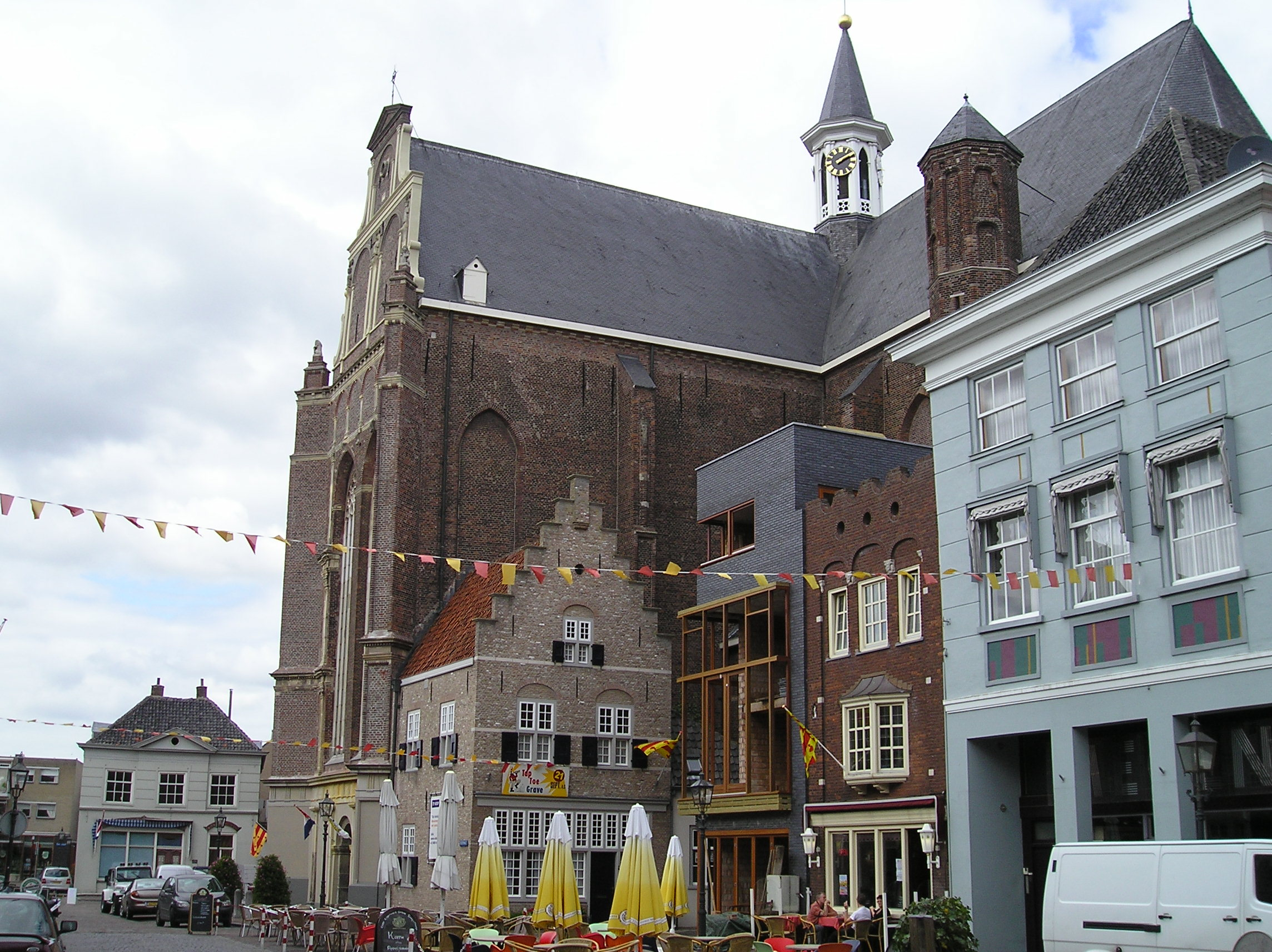
Elisabeth church in Grave, Netherlands

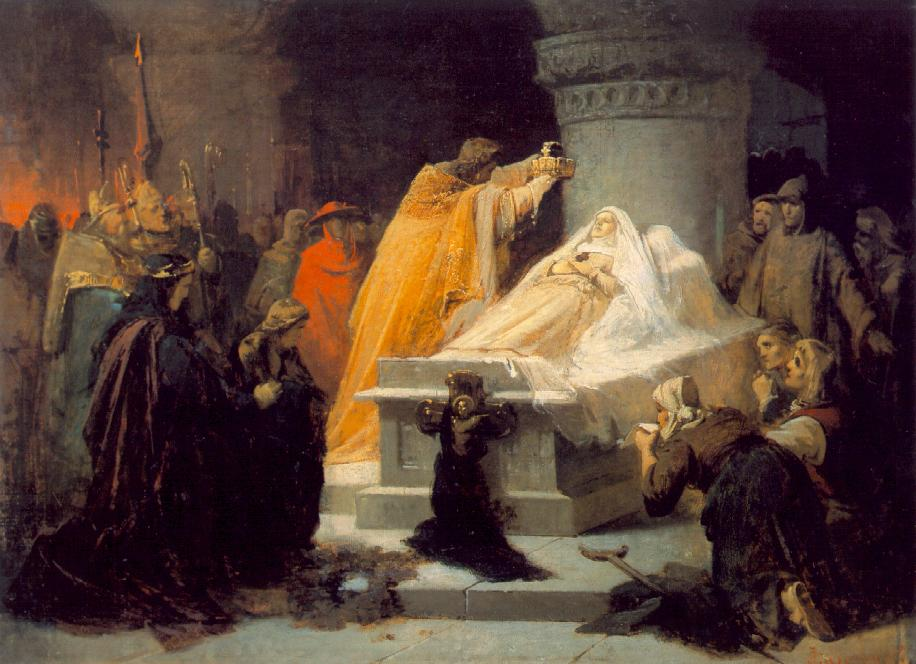
Canonization of Elizabeth of Hungary, by Sándor Liezen-Mayer (1863)

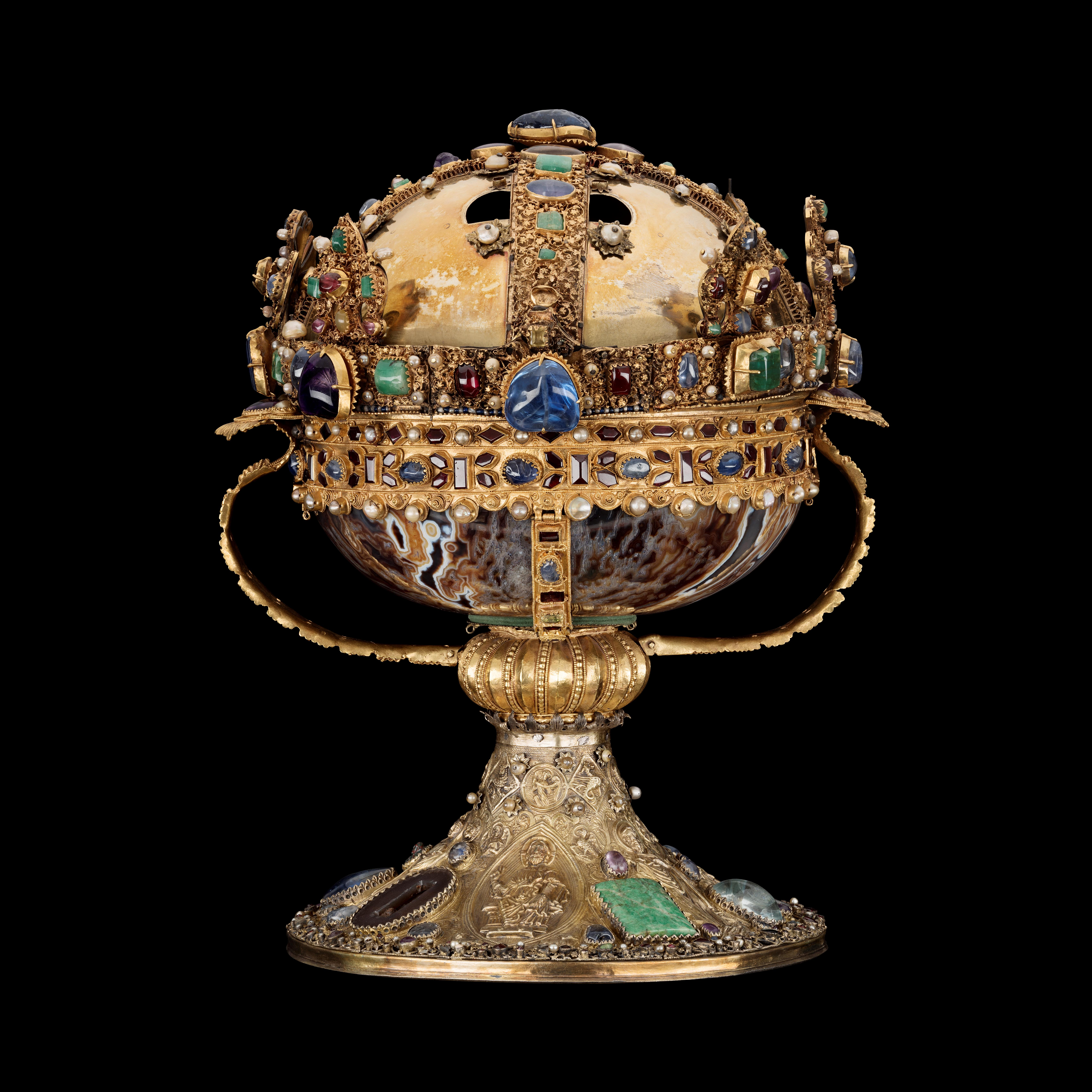
Reliquary of St. Elizabeth

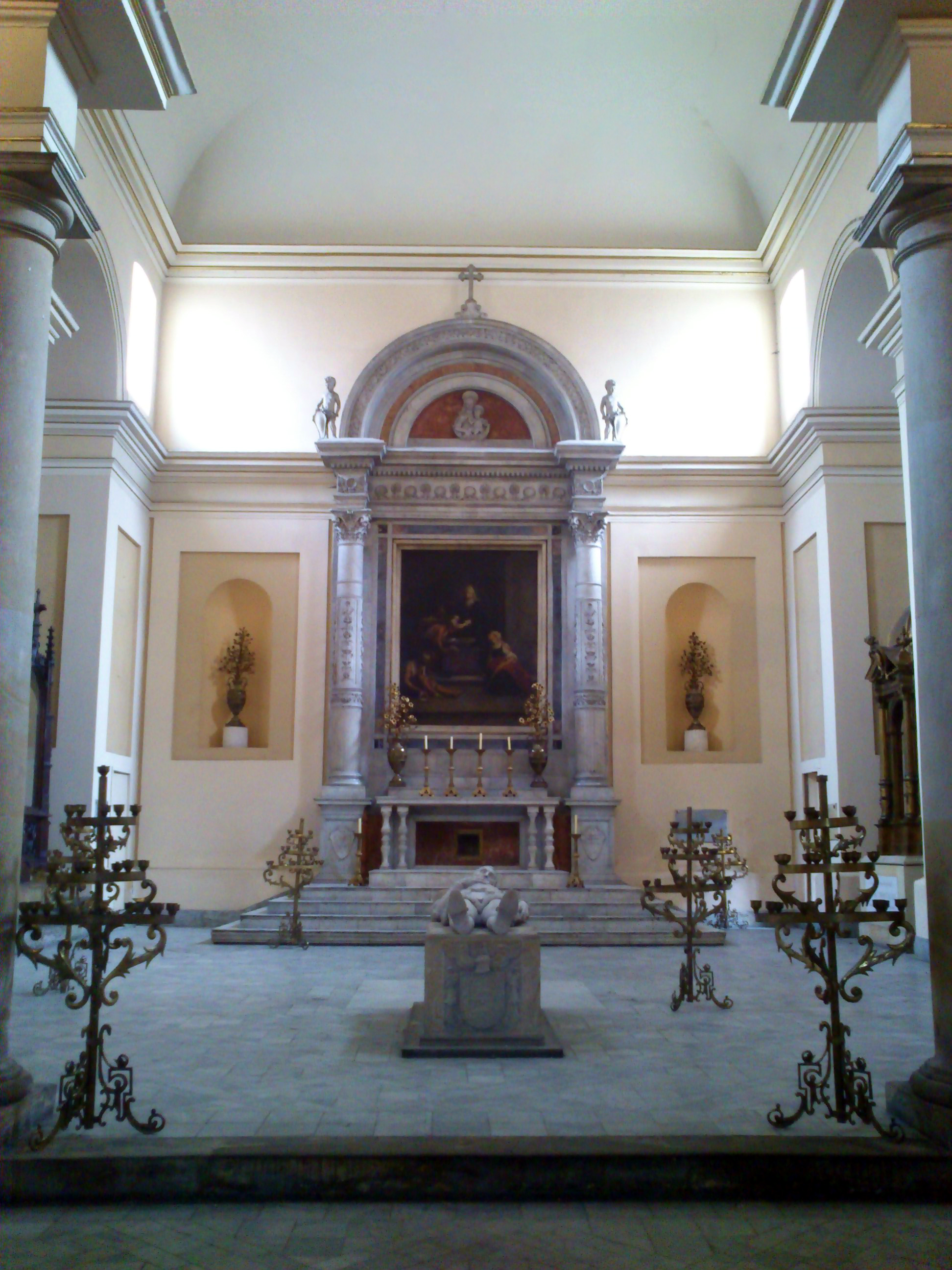
Elizabeth Chapel where her relics lie, Primatial Cathedral of Bogotá, Colombia

Elizabeth died in Marburg at the age of twenty-four, on 17 November 1231.

=== Miracles after death and canonization ===
Very soon after the death of Elizabeth, miracles were reported that happened at her grave in the church of the hospital, especially those of healing. On the suggestion of Konrad, and by papal command, examinations were held of those who had been healed between August 1232 and January 1235. The results of those examinations was supplemented by a brief vita of the saint-to-be, and together with the testimony of Elizabeth's handmaidens and companions (bound in a booklet called the Libellus de dictis quatuor ancillarum s. Elizabeth confectus), proved sufficient reason for quick canonization. She was canonized by Pope Gregory IX on 24 May 1235.

The papal bull declaring her a saint is on display in the Schatzkammer of the Deutschordenskirche in Vienna. Her body was laid in a magnificent golden shrine—still to be seen today—in the Elisabethkirche in Marburg. Marburg became a center of the Teutonic Order, which adopted Saint Elizabeth as its secondary patroness. The Order remained in Marburg until its official dissolution by Napoleon in 1803. The Elisabethkirche is now a Protestant church, but has spaces set aside for Catholic worship.

Elizabeth's shrine became one of the main German centers of pilgrimage of the 14th century and early 15th century. During the course of the 15th century, the popularity of the cult of Saint Elizabeth slowly faded, though to some extent this was mitigated by an aristocratic devotion to St Elizabeth, since through her daughter Sophia she was an ancestor of many leading aristocratic German families.

Three hundred years after her death, one of Elizabeth's many descendants, Philip I, Landgrave of Hesse, a leader of the Protestant Reformation, raided the church in Marburg. He demanded that the Teutonic Order hand over Elizabeth's bones, in order to disperse her relics and thus put an end to the already declining pilgrimages to Marburg. Philip took away the crowned agate chalice in which her head rested, but returned it after being imprisoned by Charles V, Holy Roman Emperor.

The reliquary chalice was subsequently plundered by Swedish troops during the Thirty Years' War, and is now on display at the Swedish History Museum. Her skull and some of her bones can be seen at the convent in Vienna bearing her name. A portion of her relics were kept in the church of the Carmelites in Brussels; another in the magnificent chapel of La Roche-Guyon, and a considerable part in a precious shrine is in the electoral treasury of Hanover. Another part of her relics were taken to Bogotá, then the capital of the Spanish New Kingdom of Granada, by friar Luis Zapata de Cárdenas. The relics are today inside a chapel dedicated to the saint in the Primatial Cathedral of Bogotá.

Elizabeth of Hungary is remembered in the Church of England with a Lesser Festival on 18 November and in the Episcopal Church on 19 November.

=== Association with the Franciscans ===
After her death, Elizabeth was commonly associated with the Third Order of Saint Francis, the primarily lay branch of the Franciscan Order, which has helped propagate her cult. Whether she ever actually joined the order, only recently founded in 1221, the year when she married Louis at the age of fourteen, is not proven to everyone's satisfaction.

It must be kept in mind though that the Third Order was such a new development in the Franciscan movement, that no one official ritual had been established at that point. Elizabeth clearly had a ceremony of consecration in which she adopted a Franciscan religious habit in her new way of life, as noted above.

Because of her support of the friars sent to Thuringia, she was made known to the founder, St Francis of Assisi, who sent her a personal message of blessing shortly before his death in 1226. Upon her canonization, she was declared the patron saint of the Third Order of St Francis, an honor she shares with St Louis IX of France.

== Depiction in art and music ==
Saint Elizabeth is often depicted holding a basket of bread, or some other sort of food or beverage, characteristic of her devotion to the poor and hungry. The "miracle of the roses" has also proved a popular theme for artists.

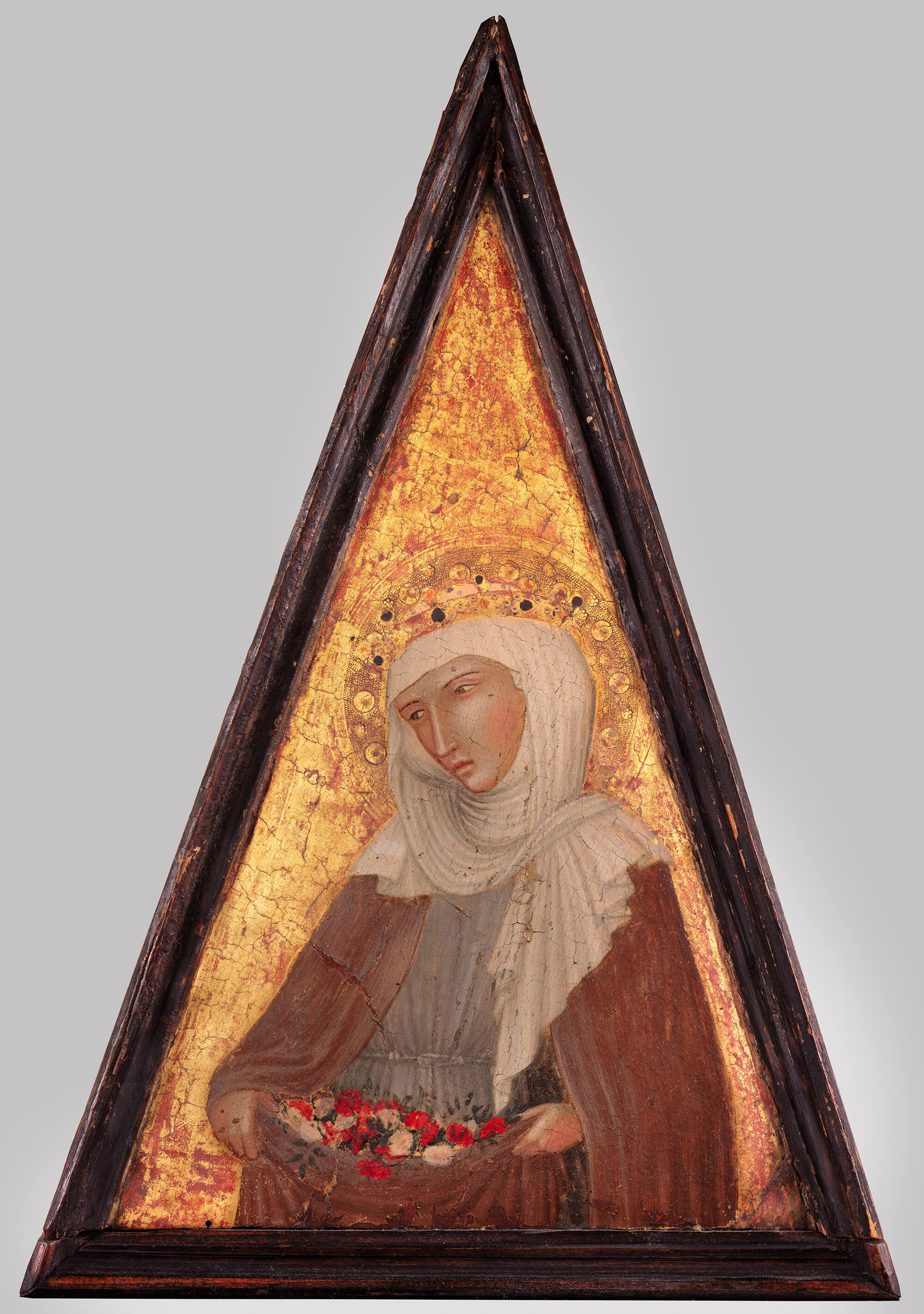
Ambrogio Lorenzetti, Saint Elizabeth of Hungary (1319-1347)

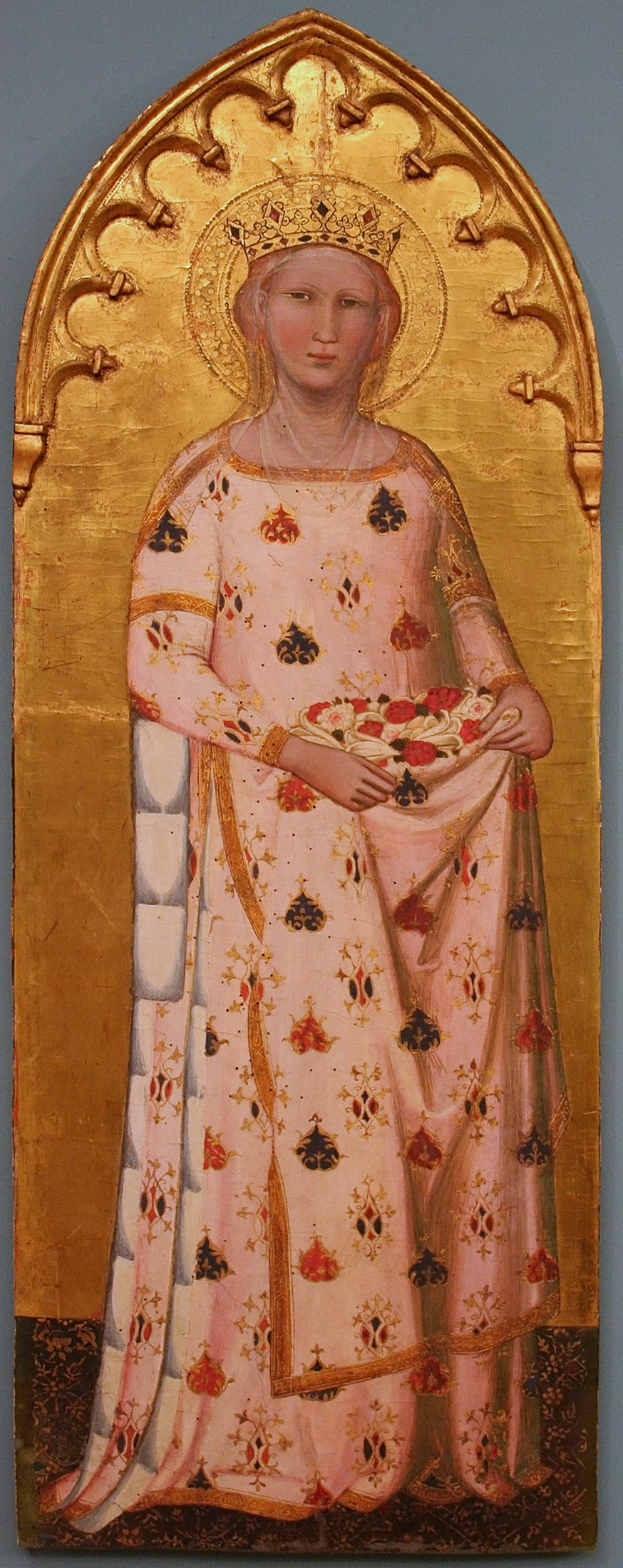
Pietro Nelli, St Elisabeth of Hungary, (1363–1367), tempera, gold and panel, Bonnefantenmuseum, Maastricht

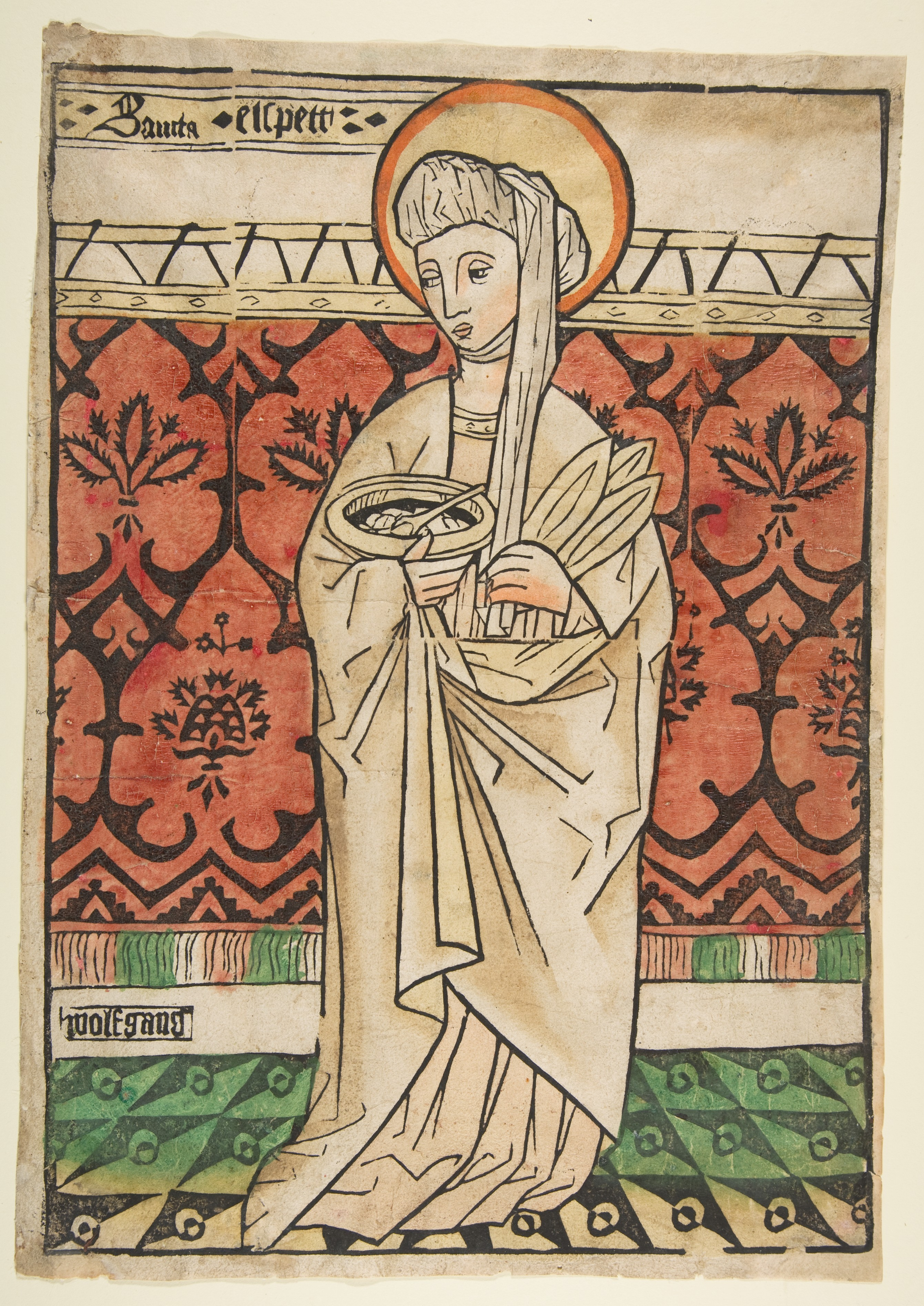
Wolfgang, Saint Elizabeth of Hungary (1470)

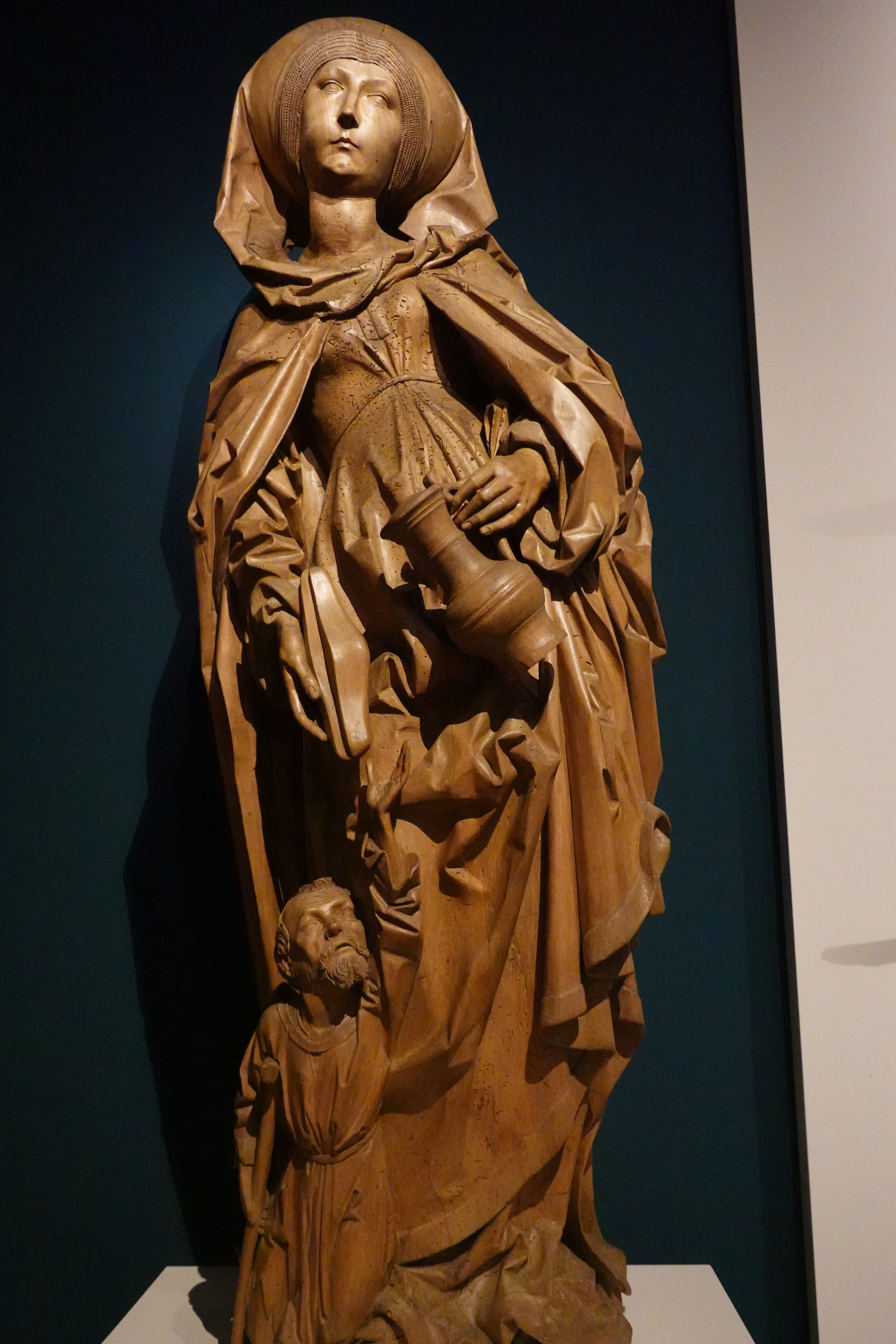
St. Elisabeth of Hungary (Tilman Riemenschneider, limewood, Bayerisches Nationalmuseum, Munich) (1492)

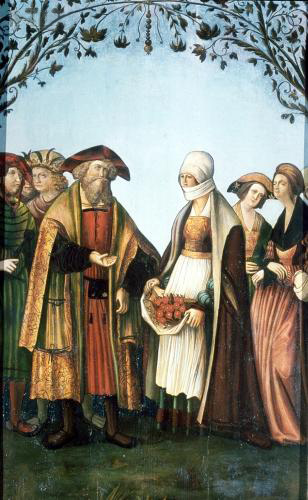
Miracle of the roses (1525)

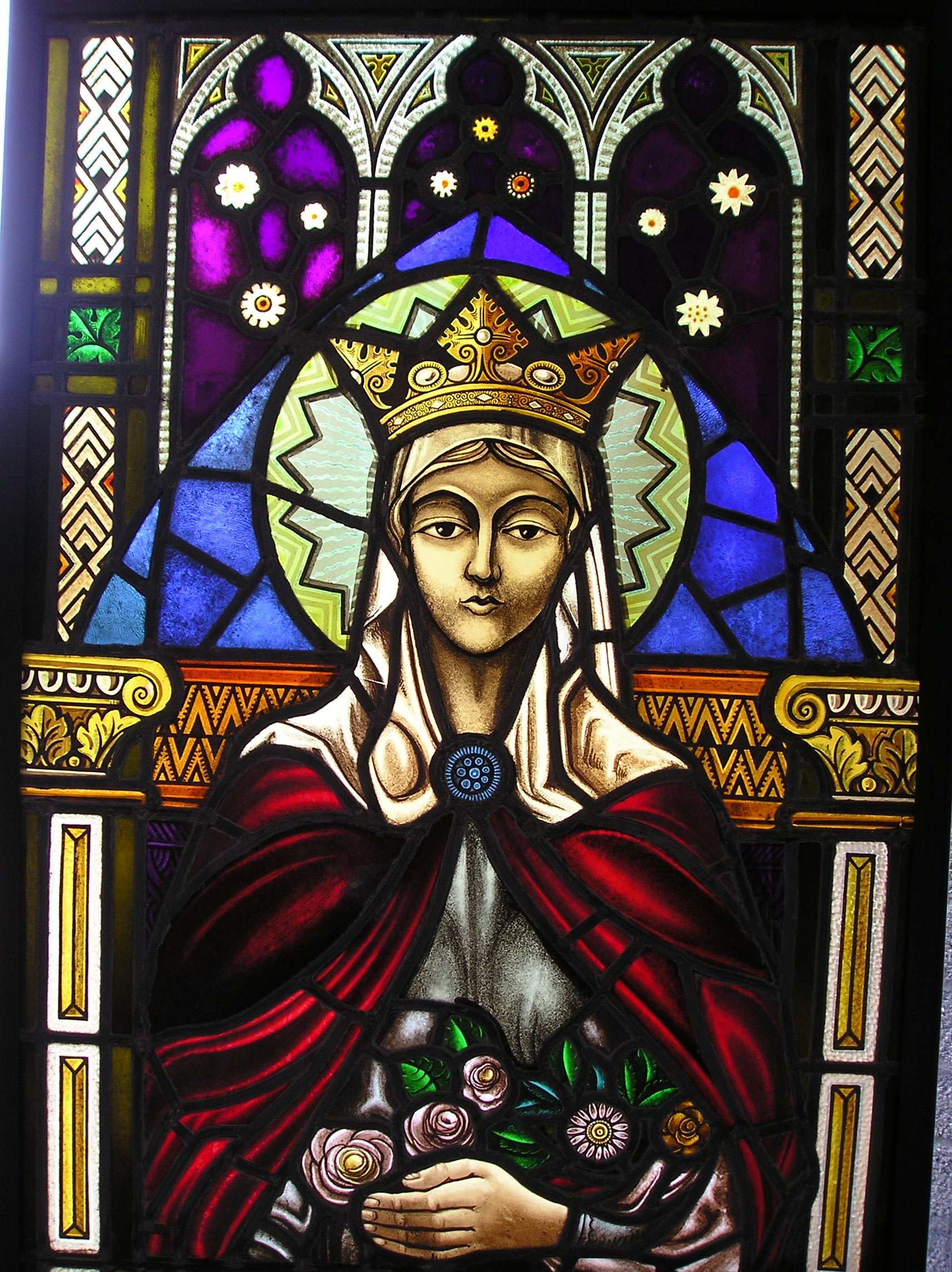
From Sint Elisabethskerk, Grave, Netherlands

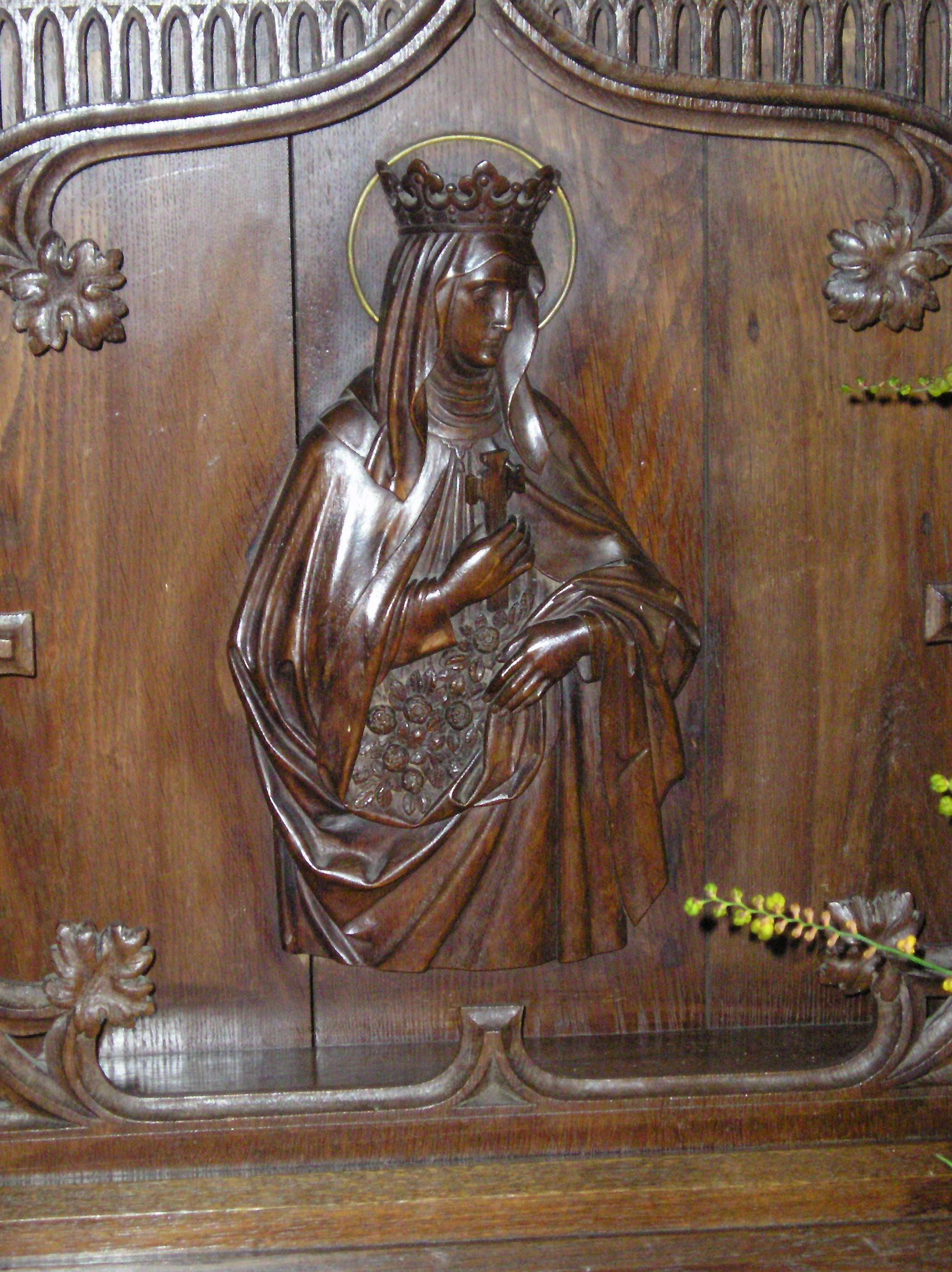
From Sint Elisabethskerk, Grave, Netherlands

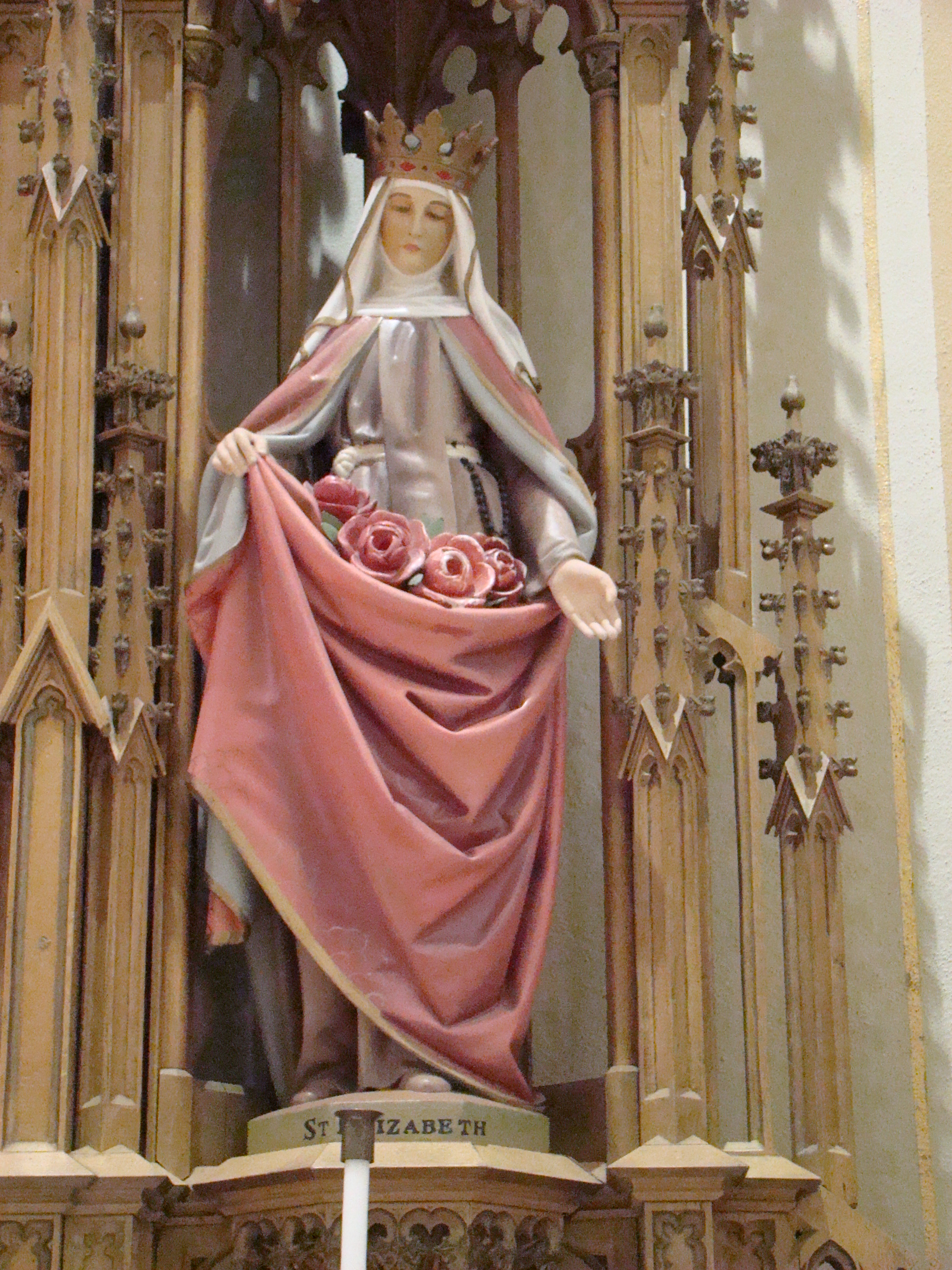
Statue of Saint Elizabeth in St Francis Xavier Catholic Church, Superior, Wisconsin

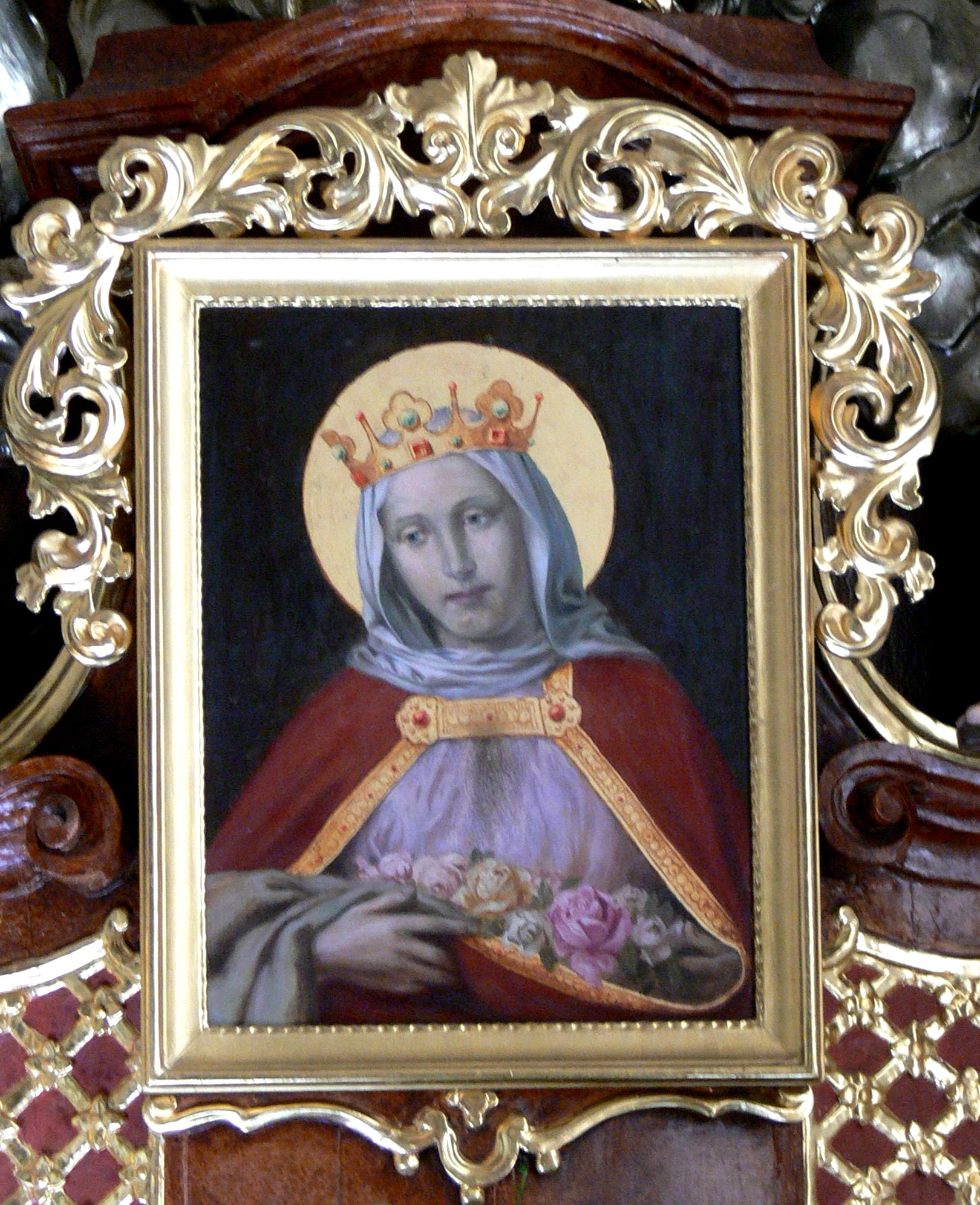
Berg Maria Trost – St Elisabeth von Thüringen

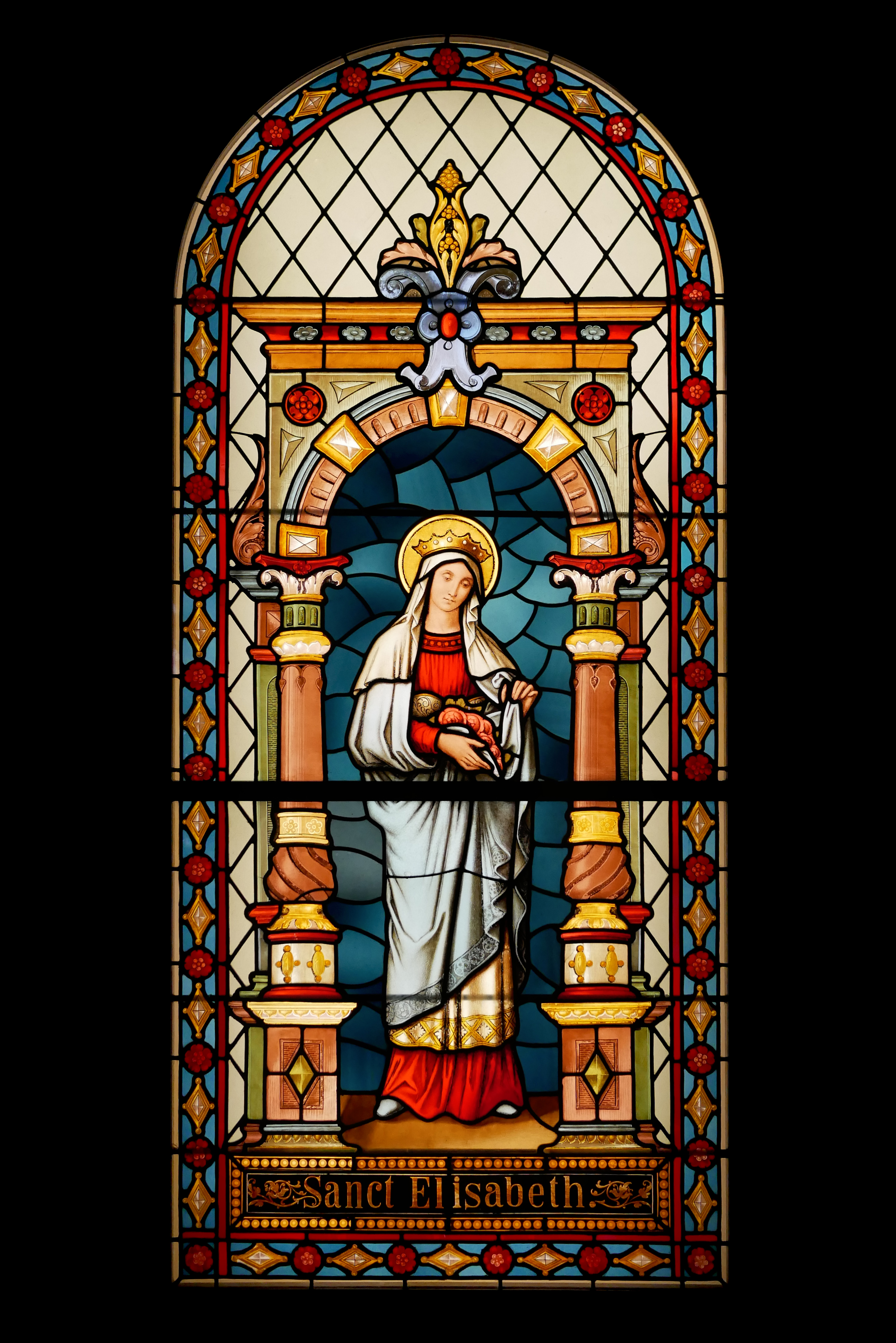
St. Elisabeth of Hungary (stained glass, 18th century, City Museum of Ljubljana)

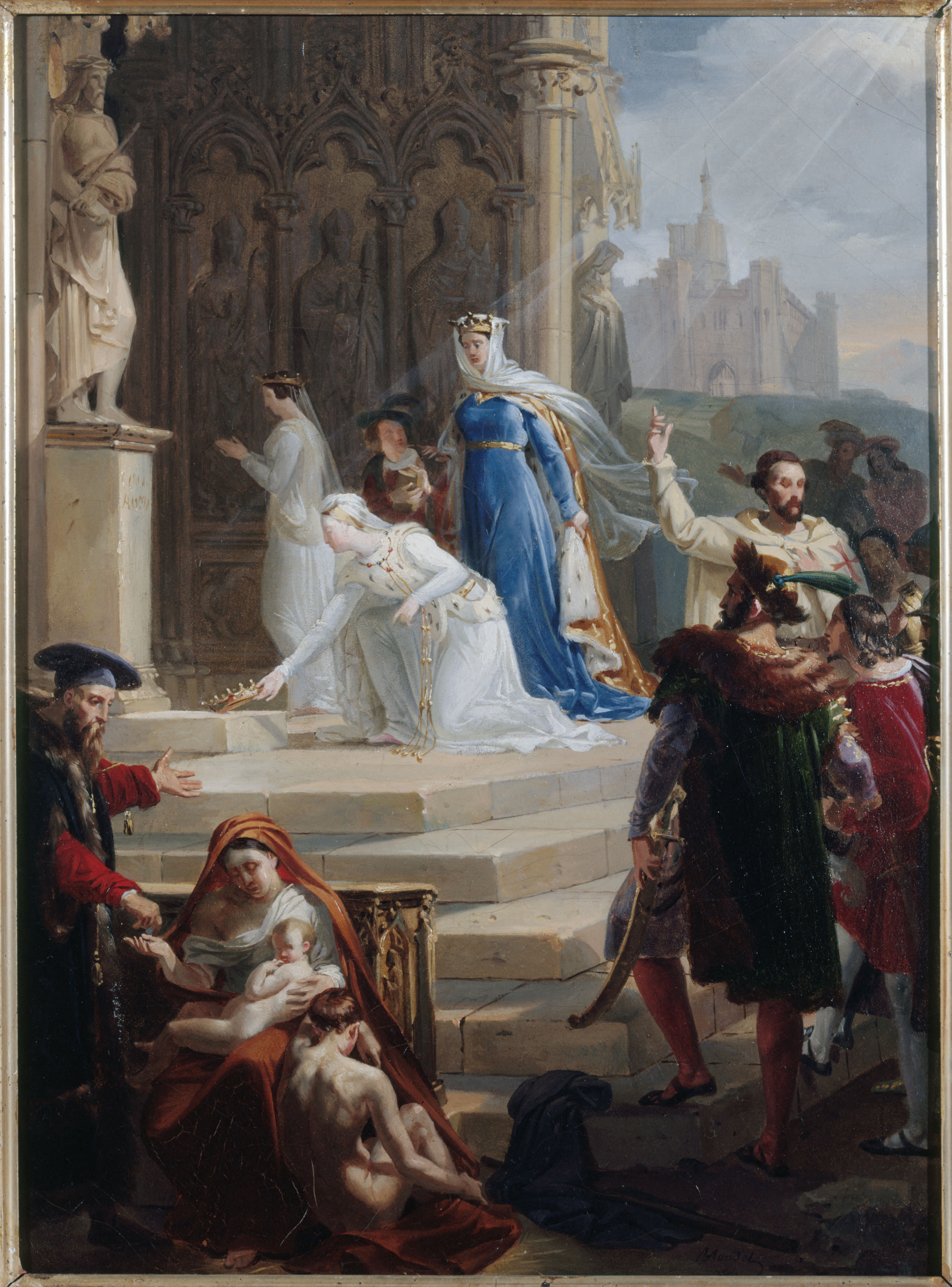
Merry-Joseph Blondel, Saint Elizabeth Queen Of Hungary (1824)

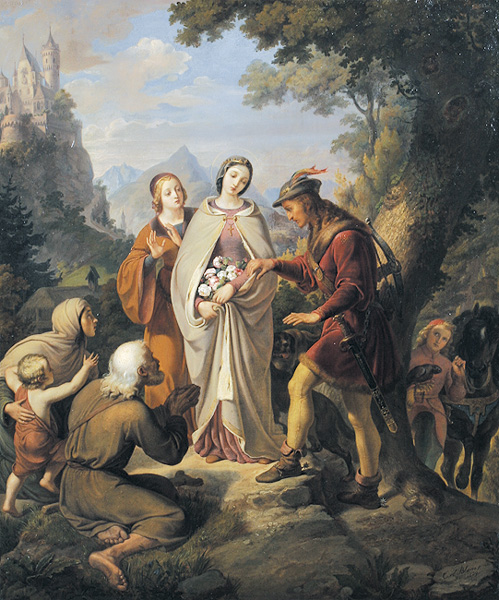
Karl von Blaas, Rosenwunder (1839)

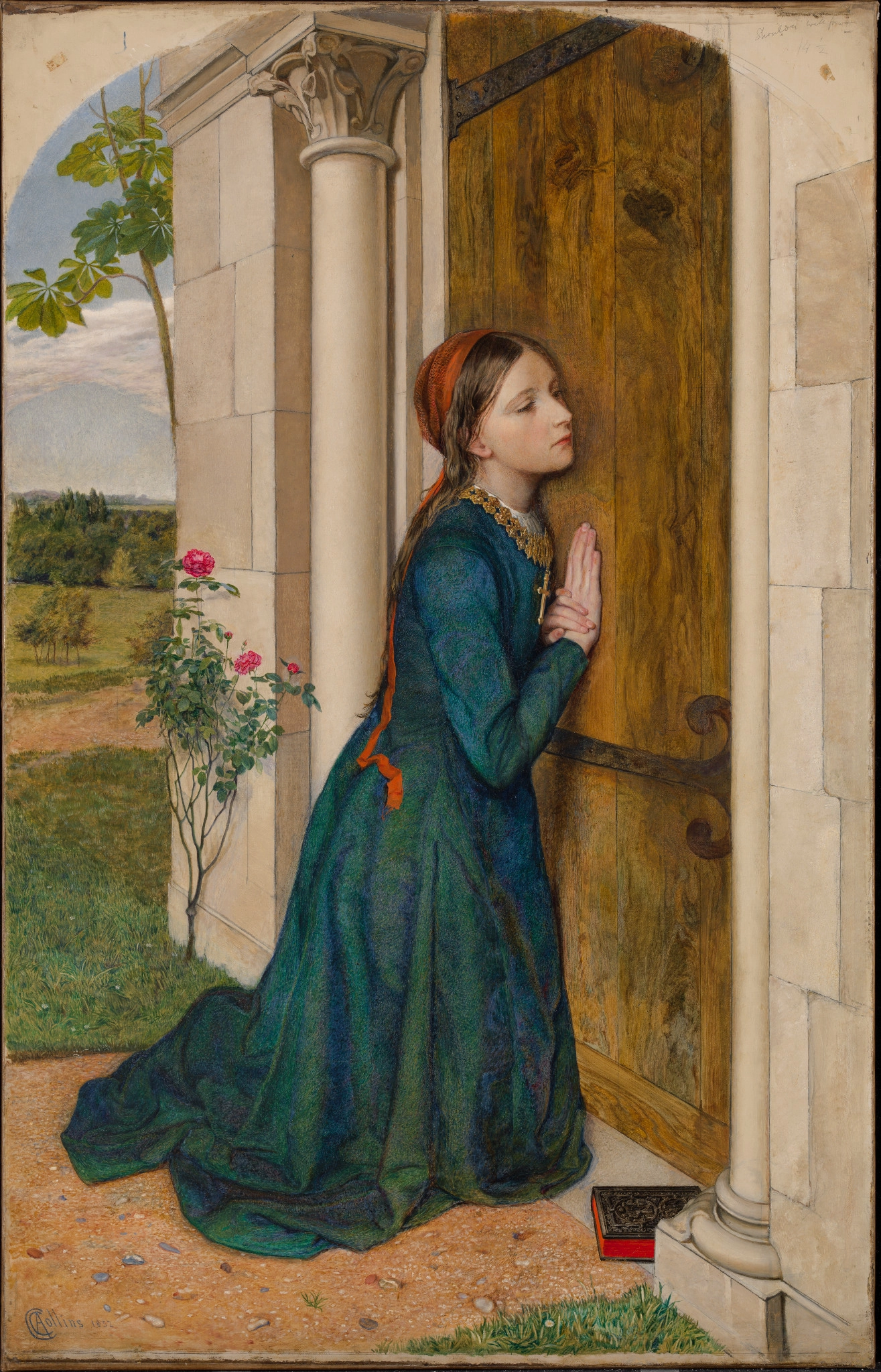
Charles Alston Collins, The Devout Childhood of Saint Elizabeth of Hungary (1852)

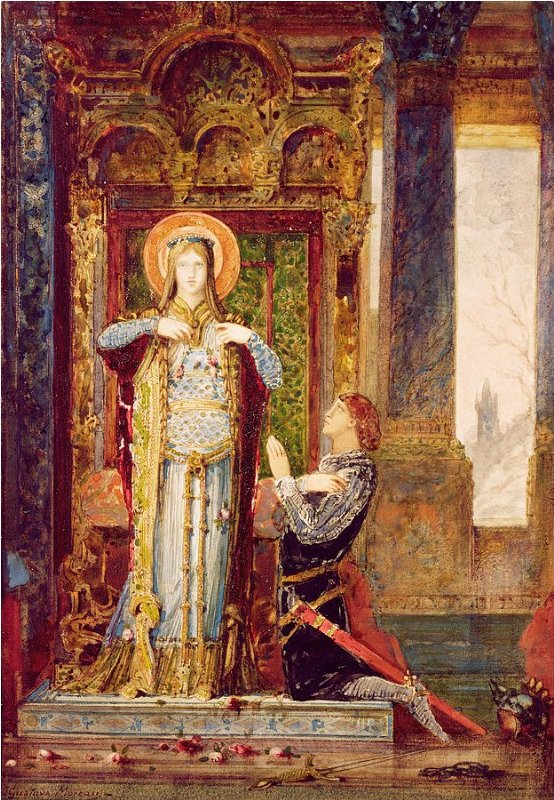
Gustave Moreau, St. Elizabeth of Hungary, or, The Miracle of the Roses (1879)

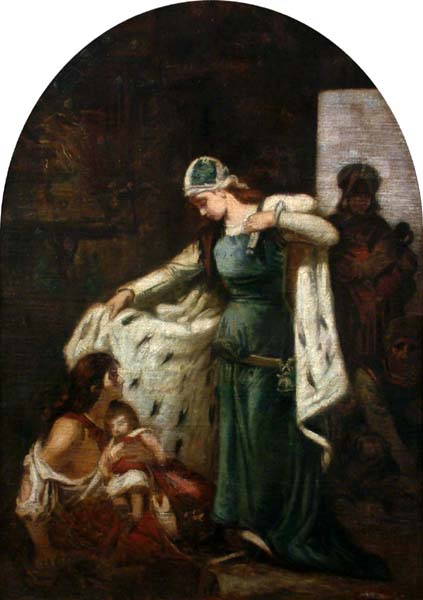
Sándor Liezen-Mayer, Saint Elizabeth of Hungary (1882)

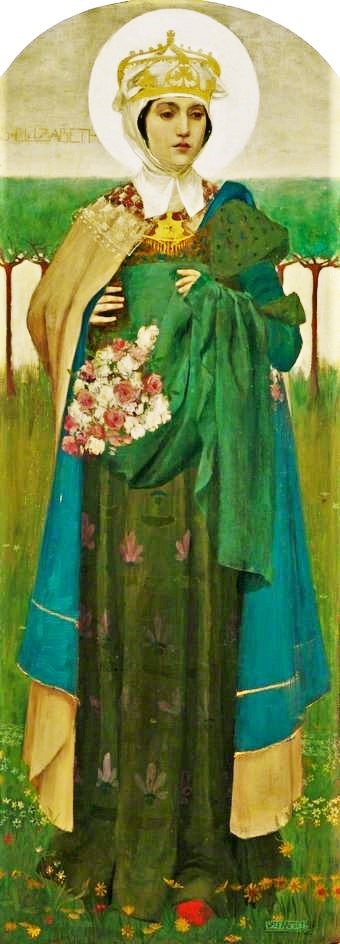
George James Frampton, Saint Elizabeth of Hungary (1895)

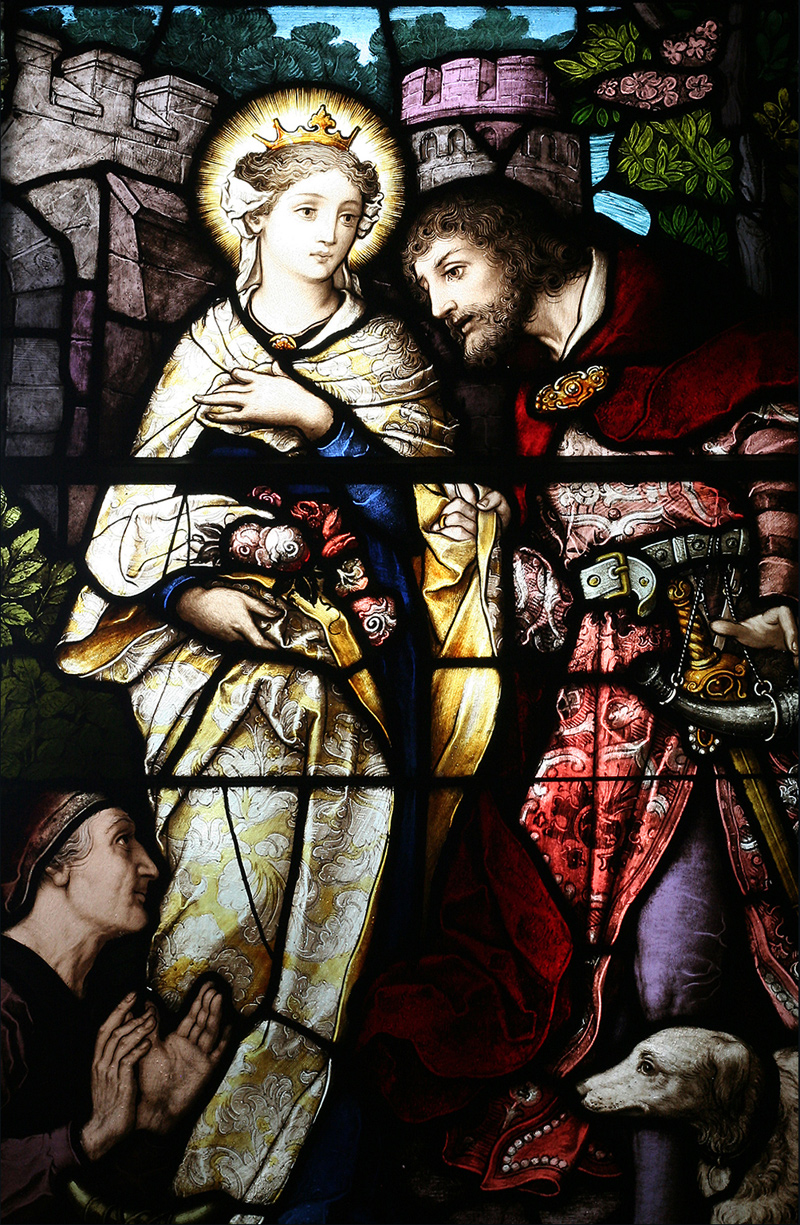
Stained-glass portrayal of St. Elizabeth's miracle of the roses at St Patrick's Basilica, Ottawa (1898)

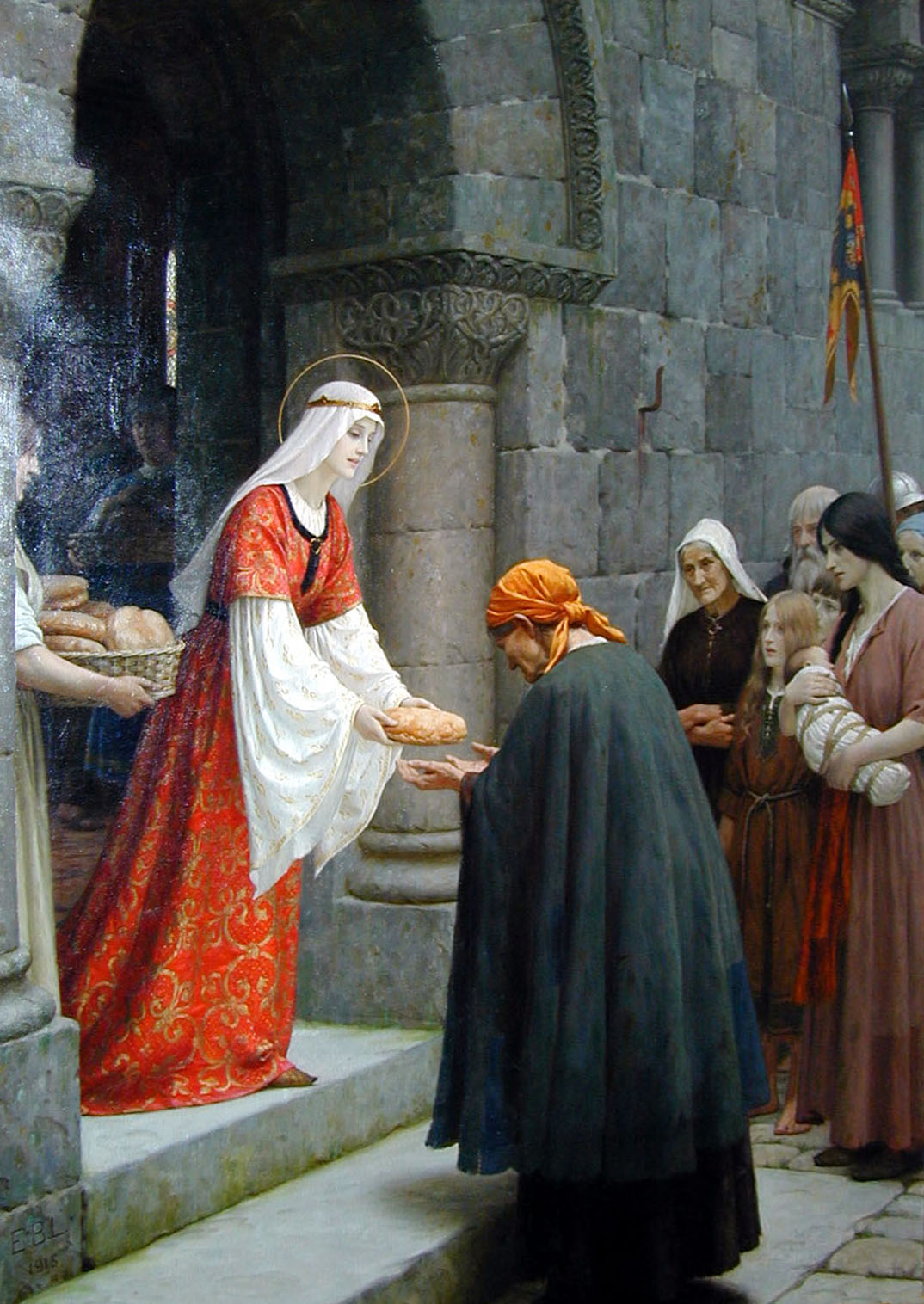
The Charity of Elisabeth of Hungary (1915) by Edmund Blair Leighton

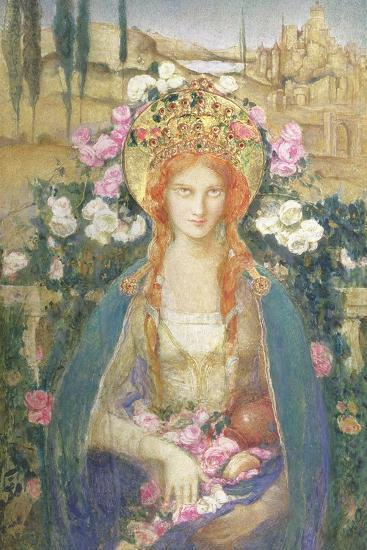
Alice Macallan Swan, St. Elizabeth of Hungary (1916)

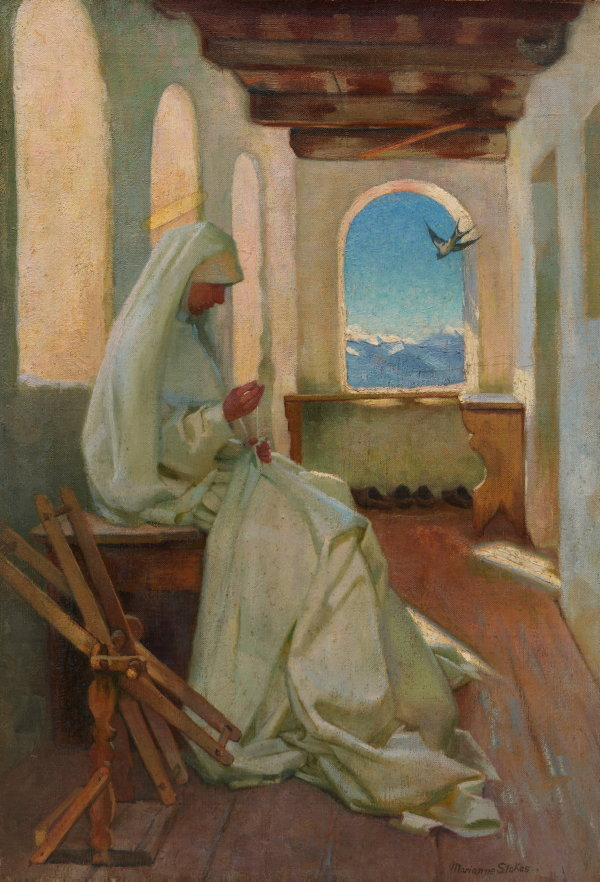
Marianne Stokes, Saint Elizabeth Working for the Poor (1920)

Peter Janssens composed a musical play ("Musikspiel") Elisabeth von Thüringen in 1984 on a libretto by Hermann Schulze-Berndt.

In Charlotte Brontë's novel Villette, the Protestant narrator includes the story of Elizabeth's involvement with von Marburg as one of several Catholic stories of confessors "who had wickedly abused their office, trampling to deep degradation high-born ladies, making of countesses and princesses the most tormented slaves under the sun."

== 2007 octocentennial celebrations ==
The year 2007 was proclaimed Elizabeth Year in Marburg. All year, events commemorating Elizabeth's life and works were held, culminating in a town-wide festival to celebrate the 800th anniversary of her birth on 7 July 2007. Pilgrims came from all over the world for the occasion, which ended with a special service in the Elisabeth Church that evening.

A new musical based on Elizabeth's life, Elisabeth--die Legende einer Heiligen (Elizabeth--Legend of a Saint), starring Sabrina Weckerlin as Elizabeth, Armin Kahn as Ludwig, and Chris Murray as Konrad, premiered in Eisenach in 2007. It was performed in Eisenach and Marburg for two years, and closed in Eisenach in July 2009.

The entire Third Order of St. Francis, both the friars and sisters of the Third Order Regular and the Secular Franciscan Order, joined in this celebration through a two-year-long program of study of her life. This was conducted throughout the Order, across the globe. There were also religious ceremonies held worldwide during that period. The yearlong observance of the centennial which began on her feast day in 2007 was closed at the General Chapter of the Order, held in Budapest in 2008. The New York region of the Order produced a movie of her life, produced by a sister of the Order, Lori Pieper.

== Ancestry ==
Ancestors of Elizabeth of Hungary

16. Béla II of Hungary
8. Géza II of Hungary
17. Helena of Raška
4. Béla III of Hungary
18. Mstislav I of Kiev
9. Euphrosyne of Kiev
19. Liubava Dmitrievna Zavidich
2. Andrew II of Hungary
20. Henri, Lord of Châtillon
10. Raynald of Châtillon
21. Ermengarde de Montjay
5. Agnes of Antioch
22. Bohemund II of Antioch
11. Constance of Antioch
23. Alice of Jerusalem
1. Saint Elisabeth of Hungary
24. Berthold II, Count of Andechs
12. Berthold III, Count of Andechs
25. Sophie of Istria
6. Berthold IV, Duke of Merania
26. Otto IV, Count of Wittelsbach
13. Hedwig of Wittelsbach
27. Heilika of Pettendorf-Lengenfeld-Hopfenohe
3. Gertrude of Merania
28. Conrad, Margrave of Meissen
14. Dedi III, Margrave of Lusatia
29. Luitgard of Elchingen-Ravenstein
7. Agnes of Wettin and Rochlitz
30. Goswin II of Heinsberg
15. Matilda of Heinsberg
31. Aleidis von Sommerschenburg

== Honors ==
Saint Elizabeth of Hungary: On the 700-year anniversary of her death, Hungary issued a set of four stamps in her honor: on 21 April 1932; on 1 August 1944 one postage stamp was issued; on 16 July 1938 Czechoslovakia issued a stamp in her honor showing the Cathedral of St. Elizabeth in Košice. She was declared the patron saint of the same city in 2019.

The hymn "Wenn das Brot, das wir teilen", written for a pilgrimage to places in Thuringia connected to her life, refers to her Miracle of the roses, and mentions other works of charity.

== Gallery ==
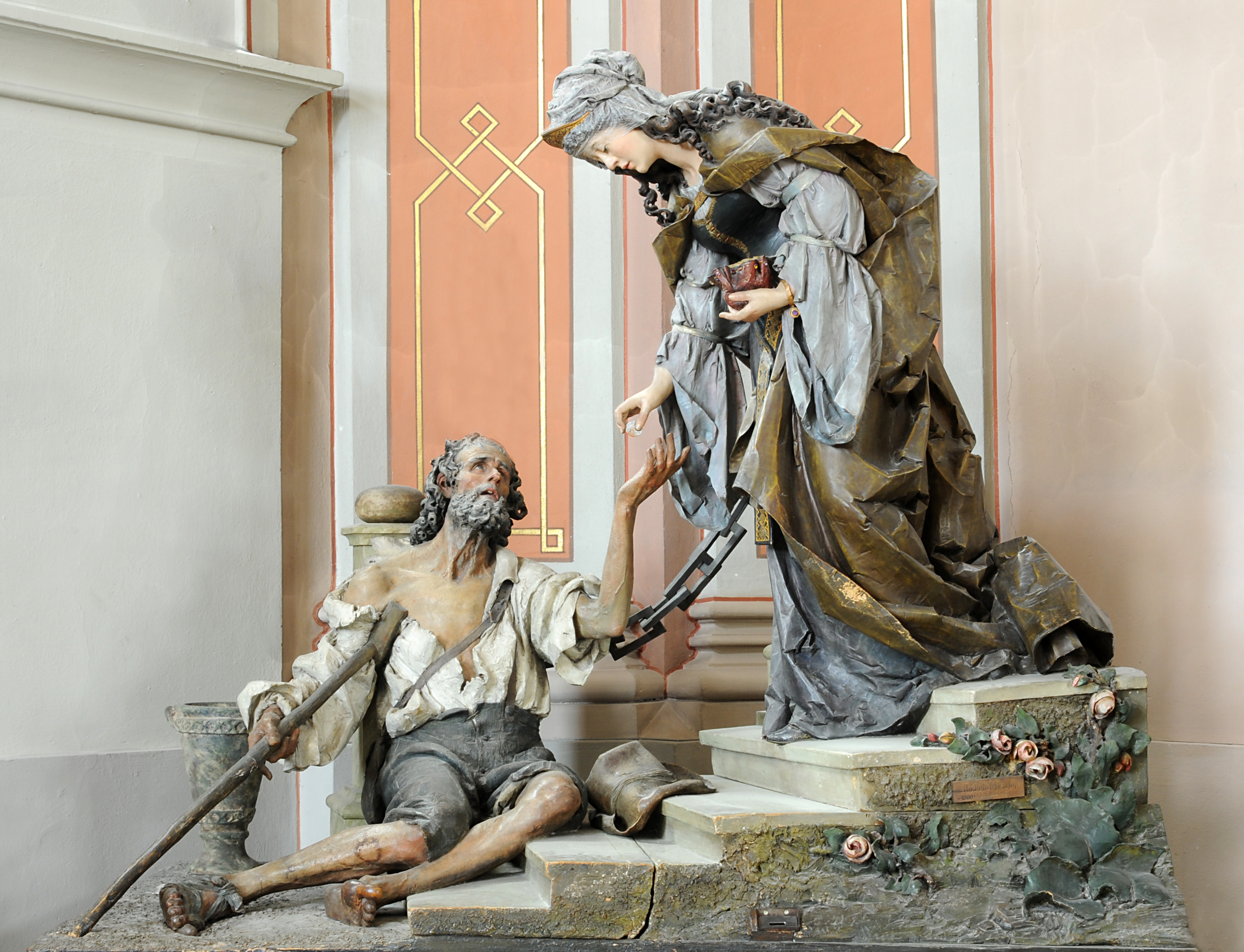
Woodcarved polychrome sculpture of St Elizabeth with a beggar, by Rudolf Moroder, Parish church of Urtijëi, Italy

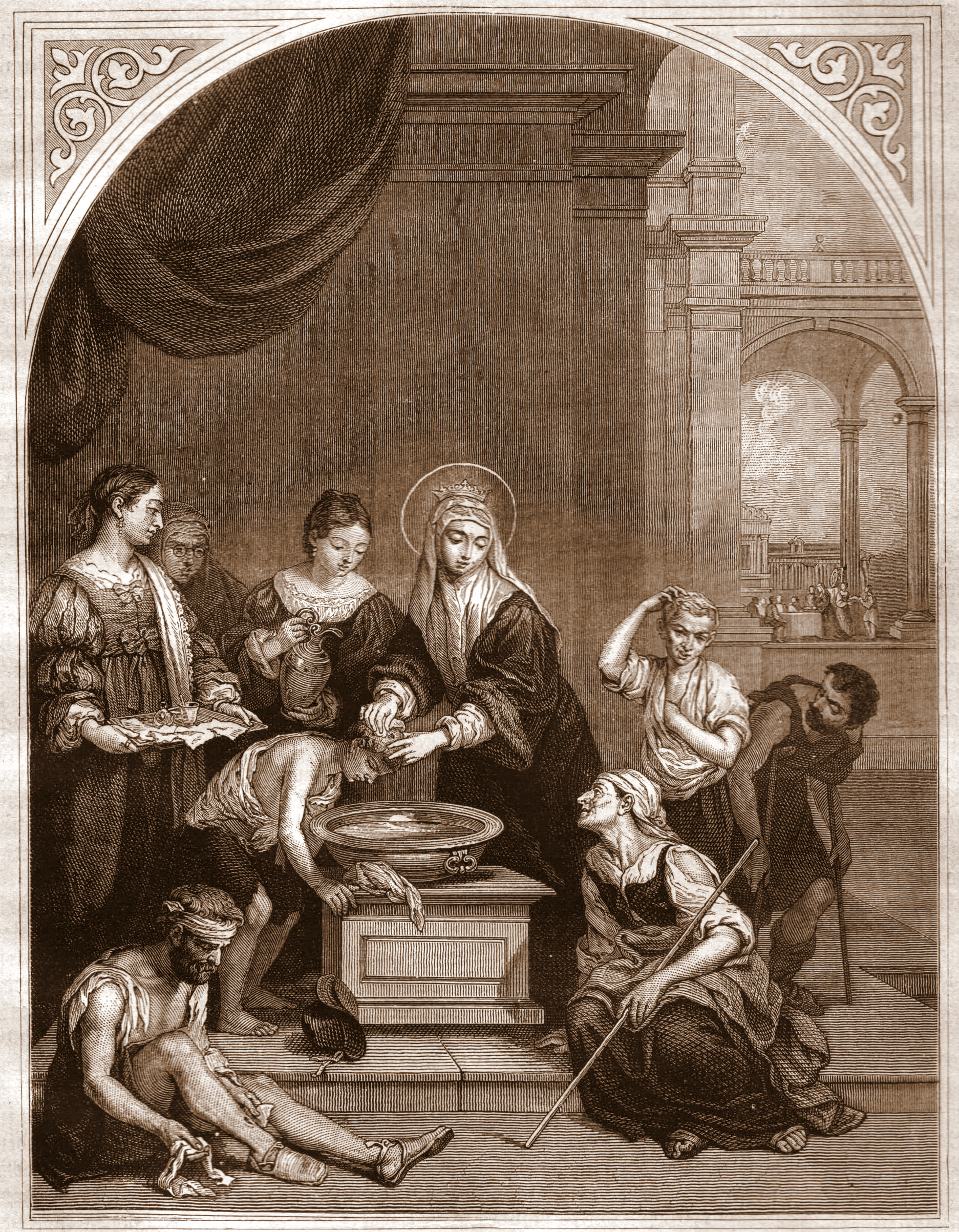
Saint Elizabeth takes care of the sick.

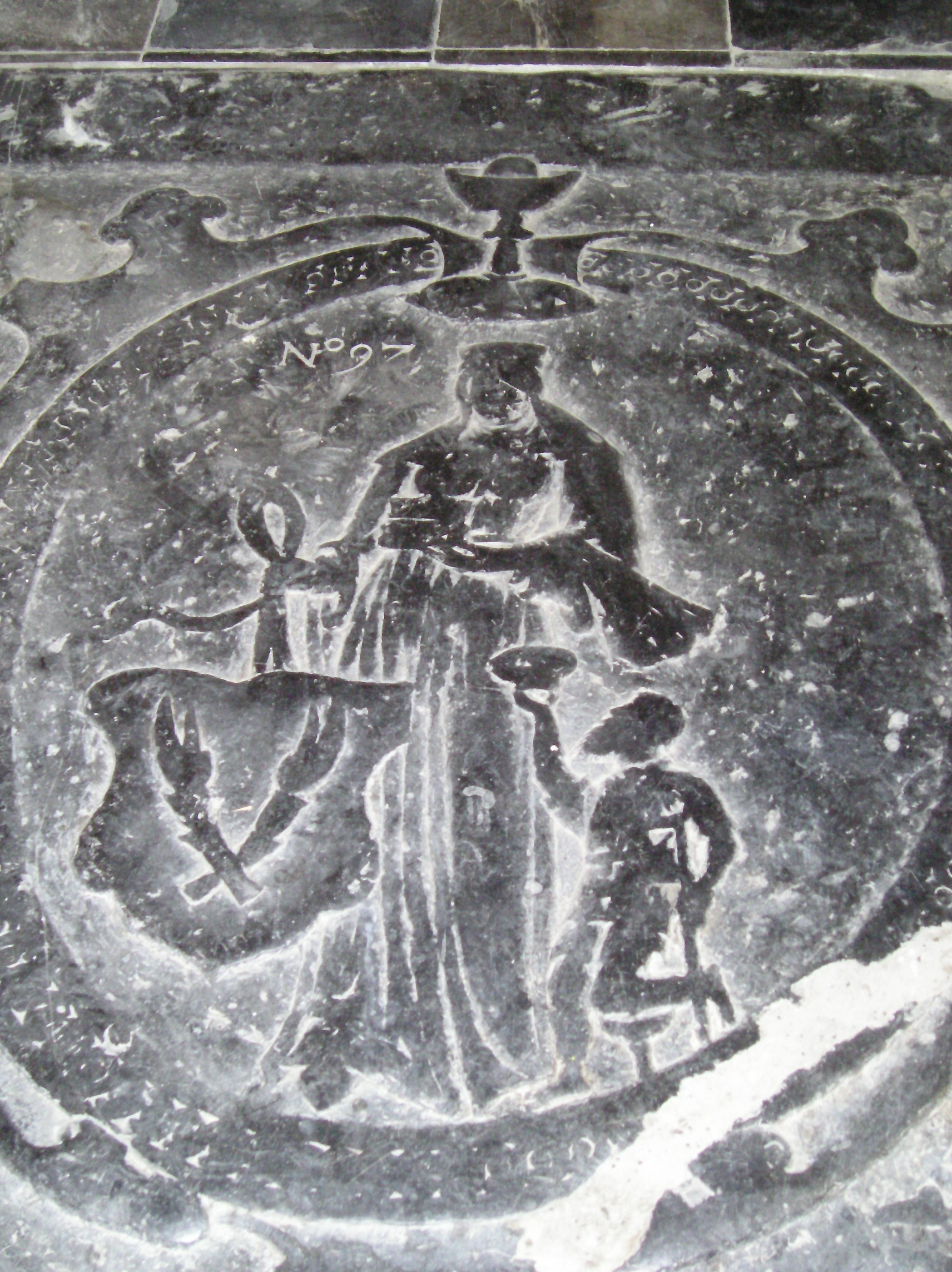
From Sint Elisabethskerk, Grave, Netherlands

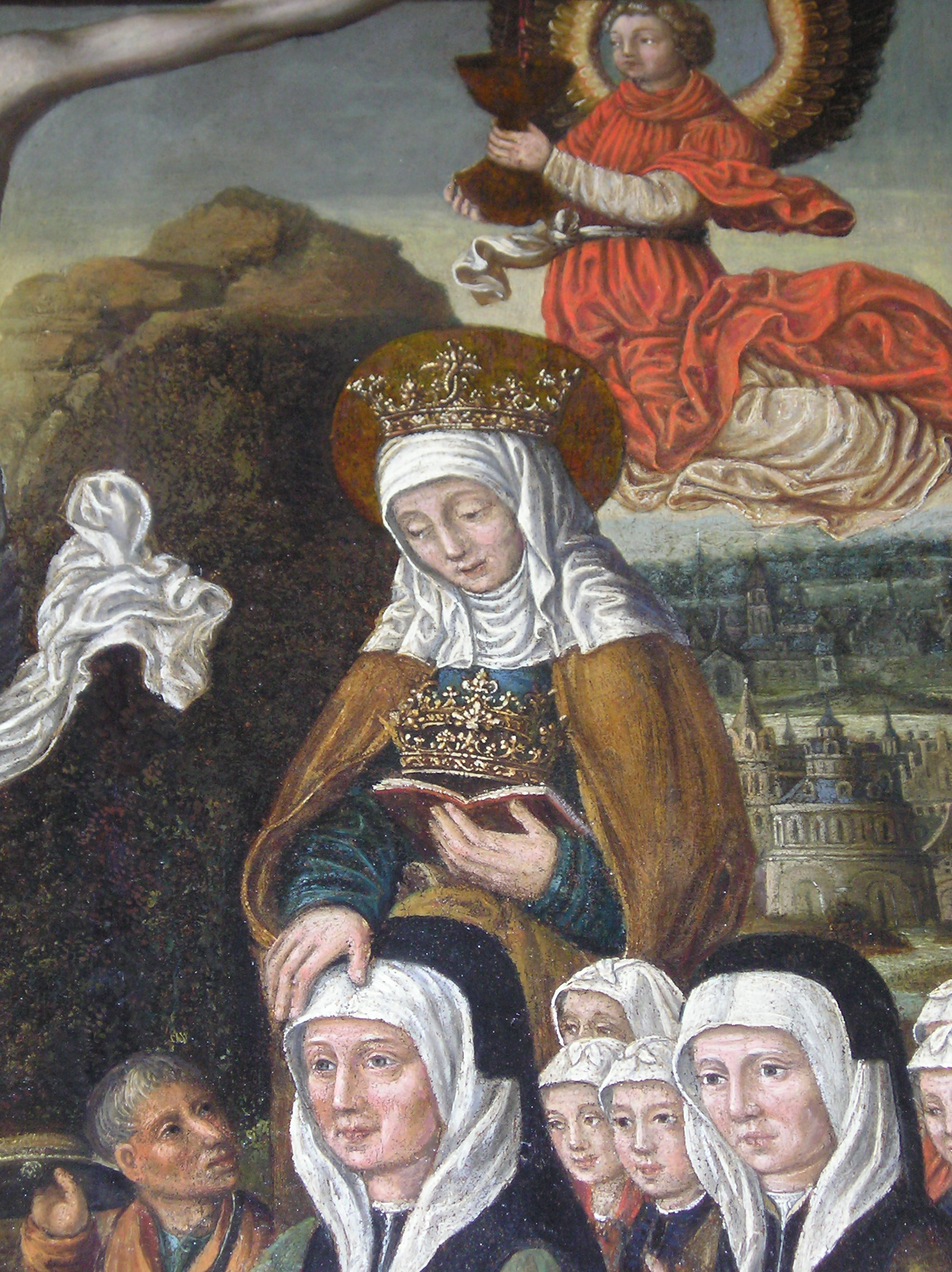
From Sint Elisabethskerk, Grave, Netherlands

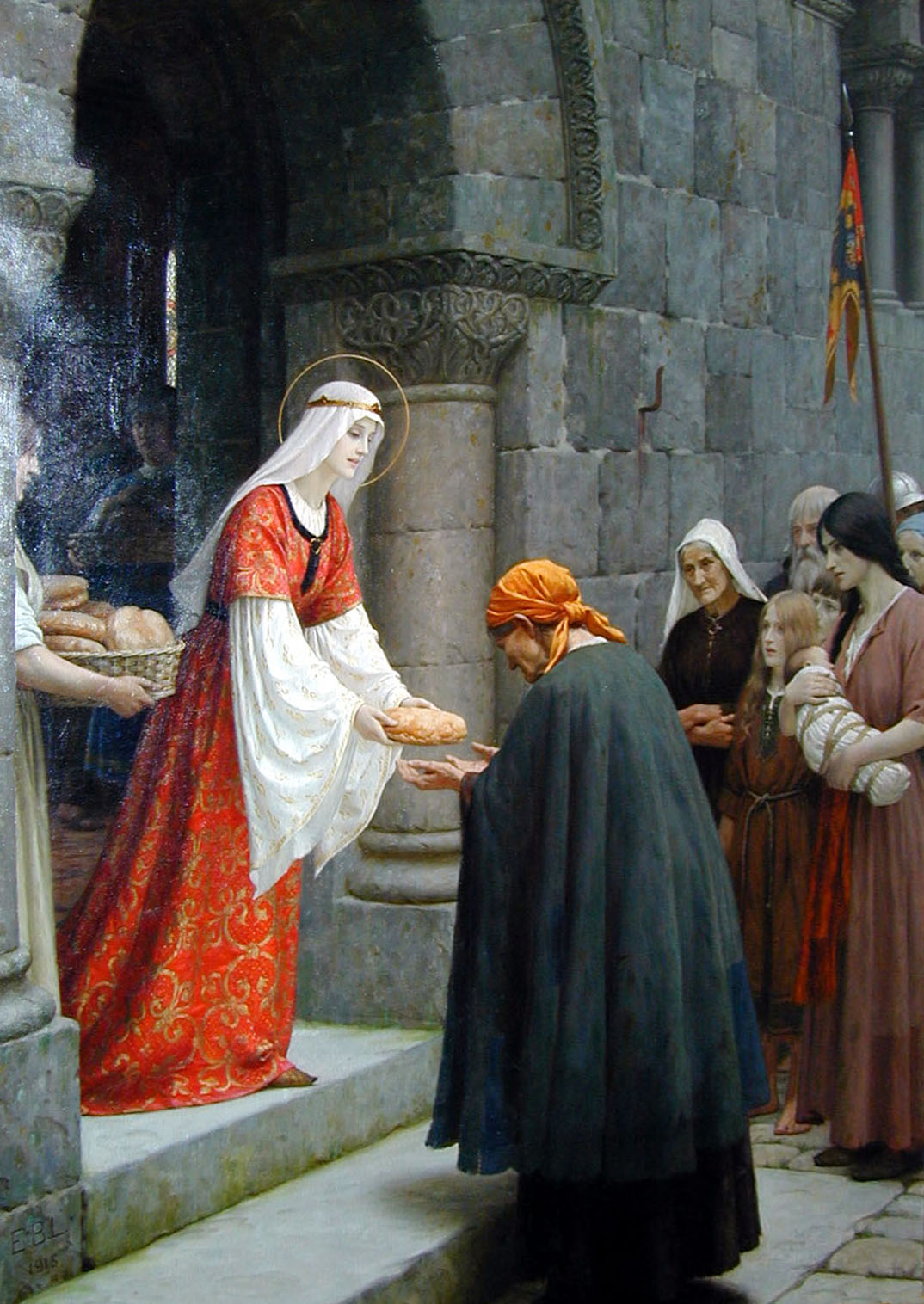
The Charity of St Elizabeth of Hungary, 1895

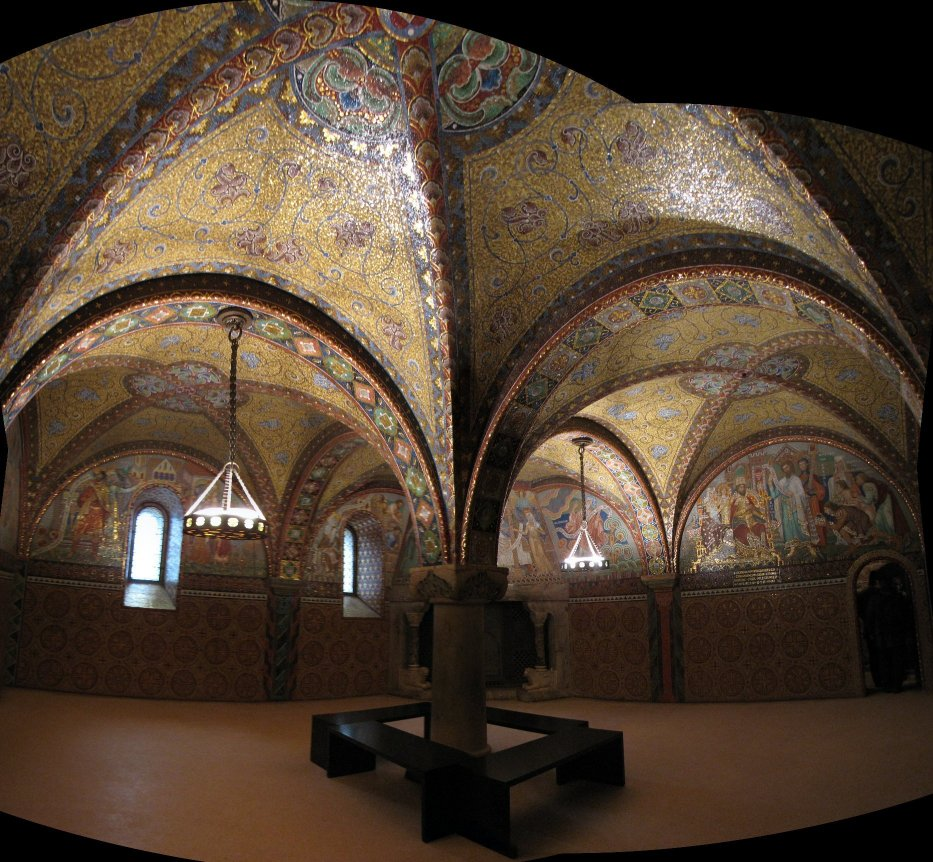
The Elizabeth Bower, Wartburg

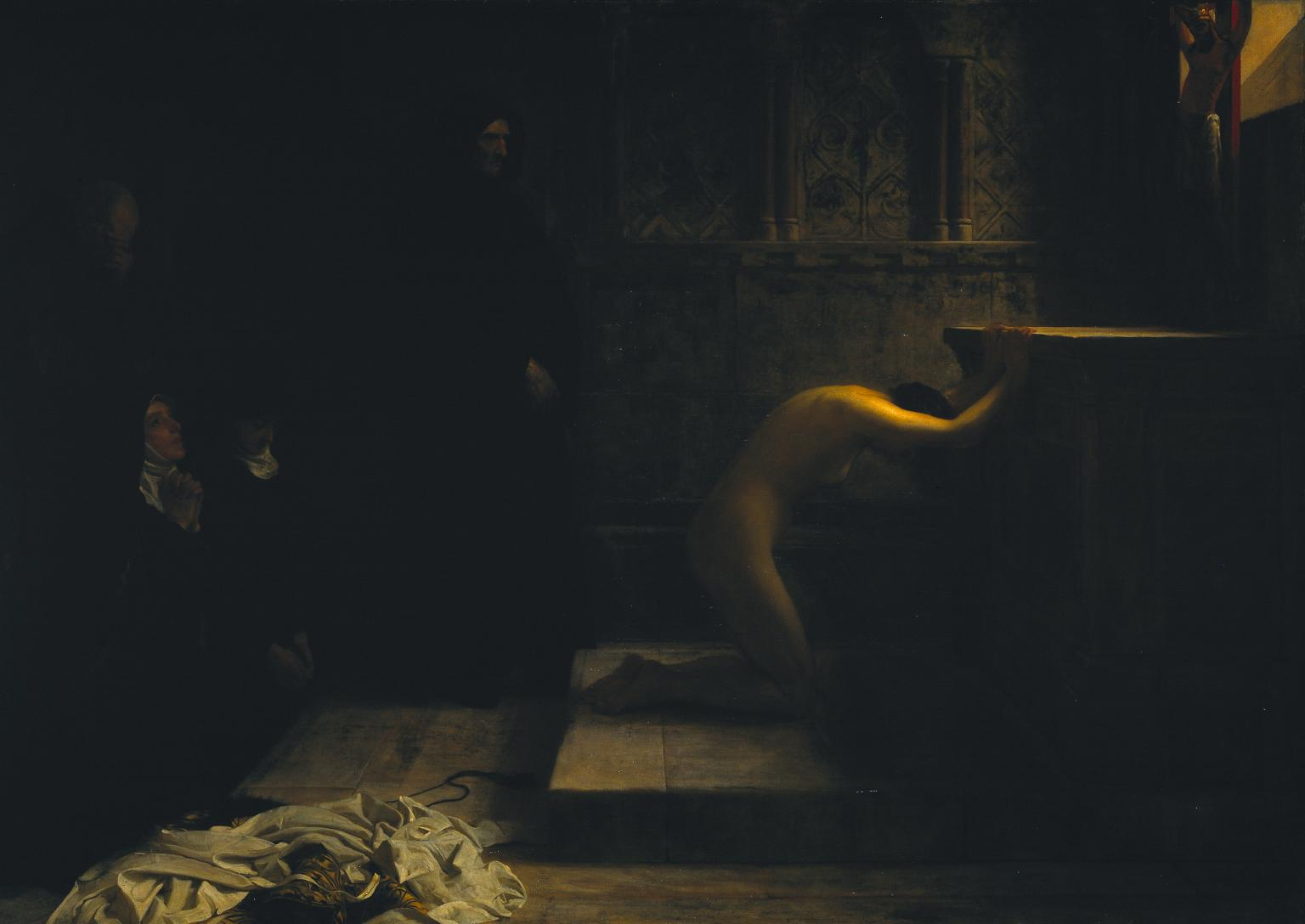
Philip Hermogenes Calderon, Saint Elizabeth of Hungary's Great Act of Renunciation (1891)

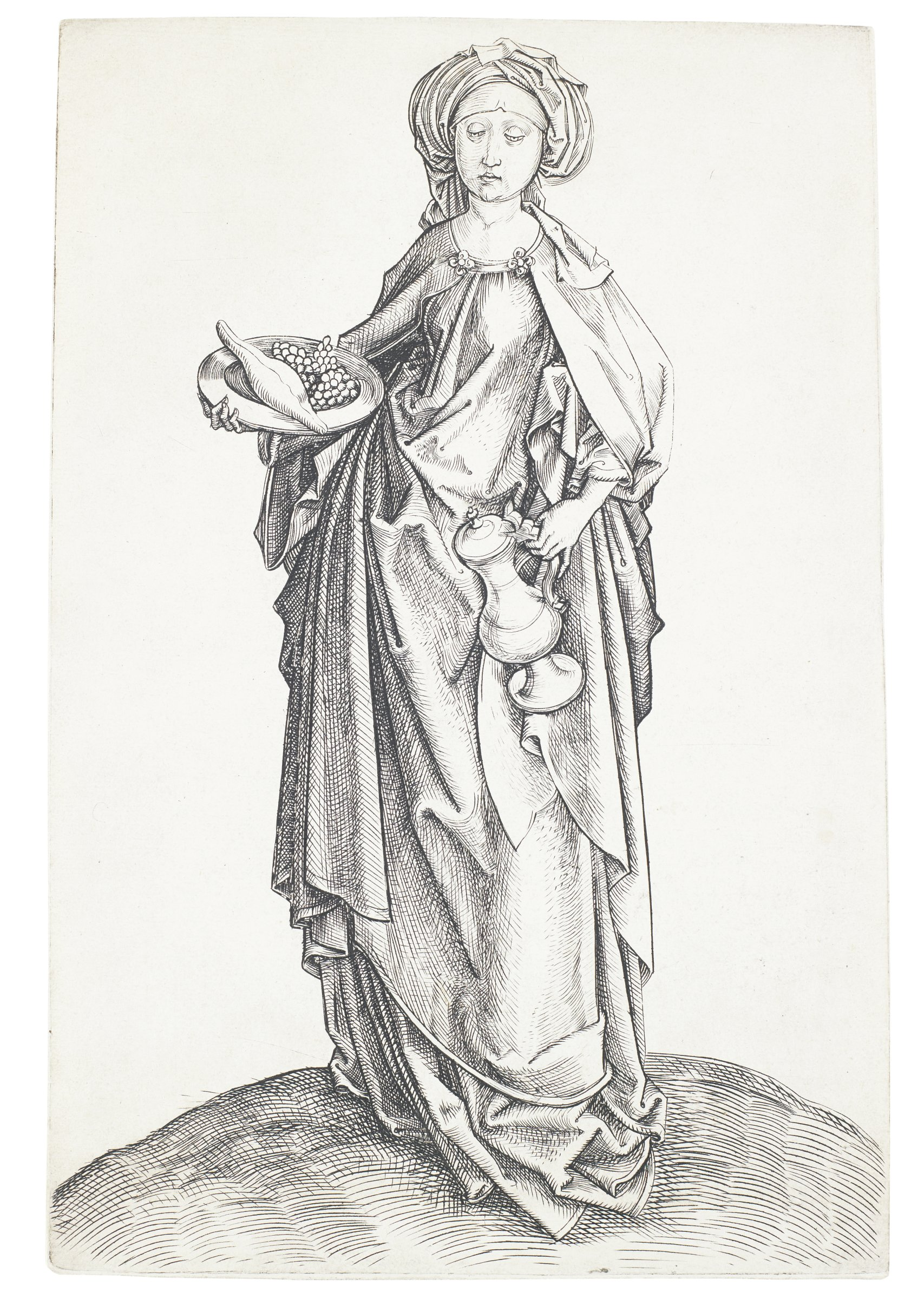
Engraved print of St Elizabeth, Birmingham Museum of Art

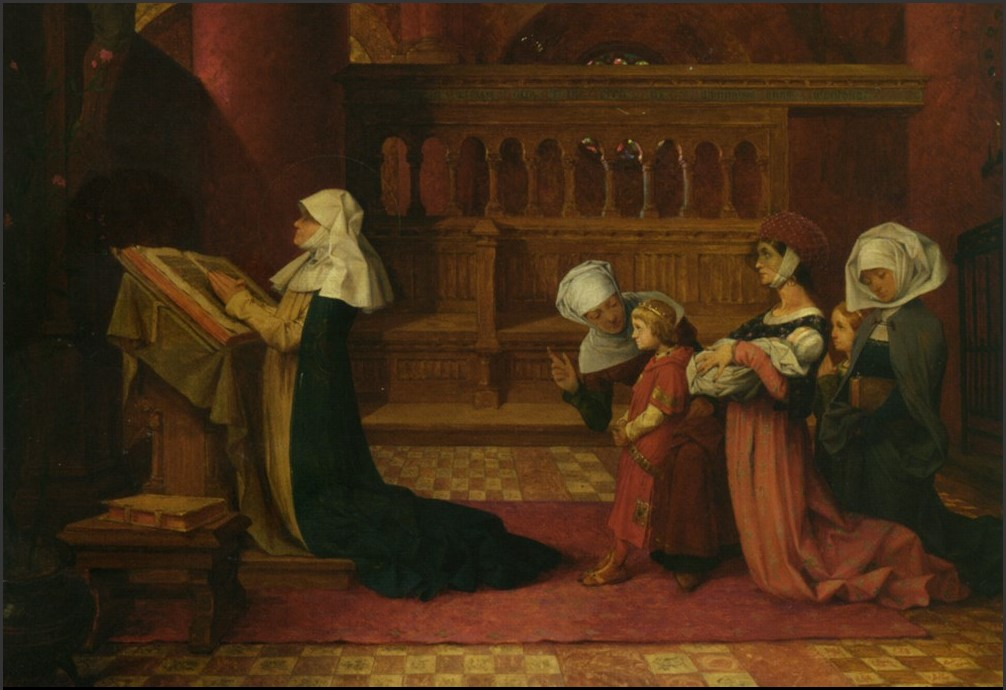
Saint Elizabeth of Hungary by Théophile Lybaert

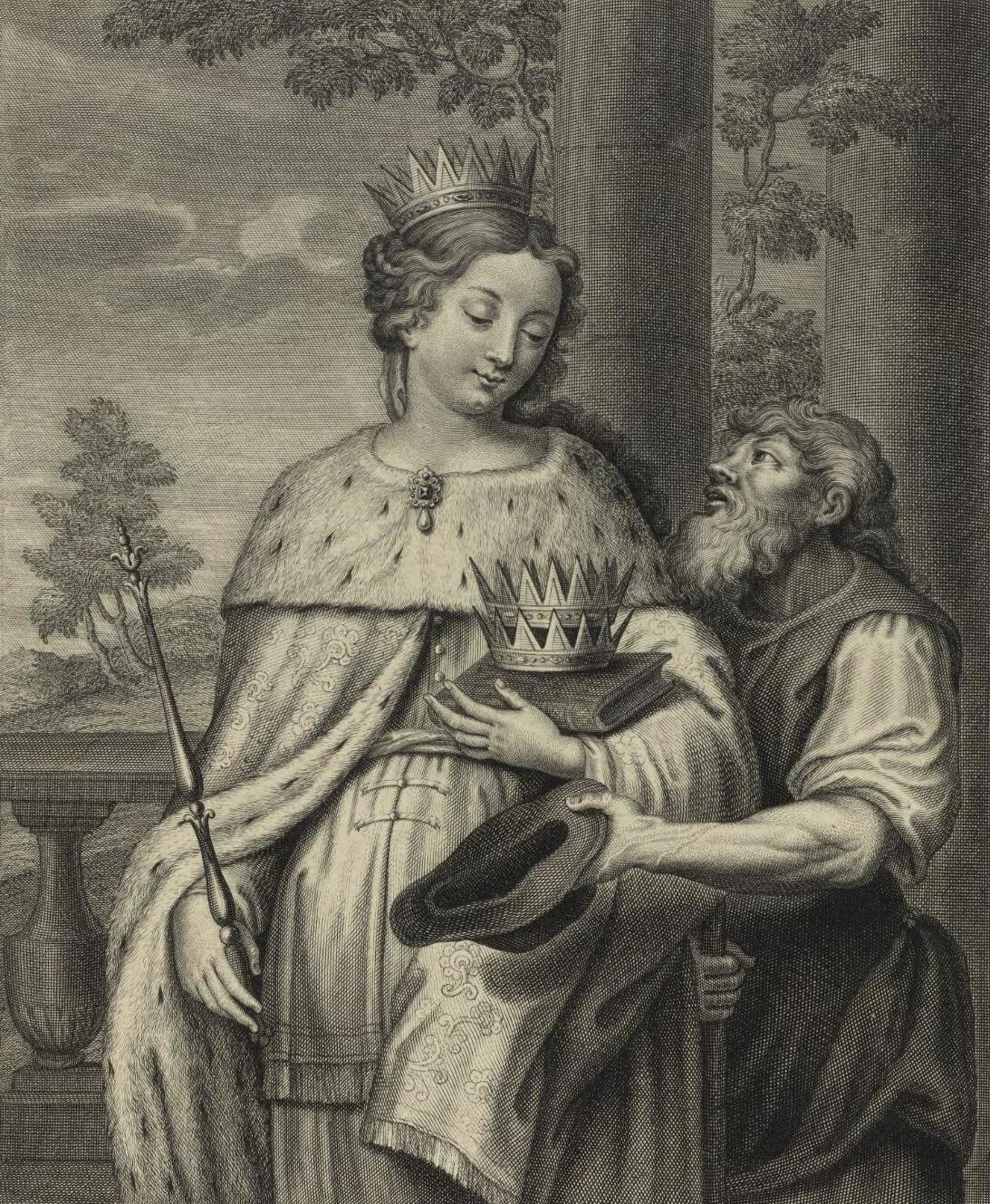
17th-century engraving of Saint Elizabeth with a beggar by A. Houatt

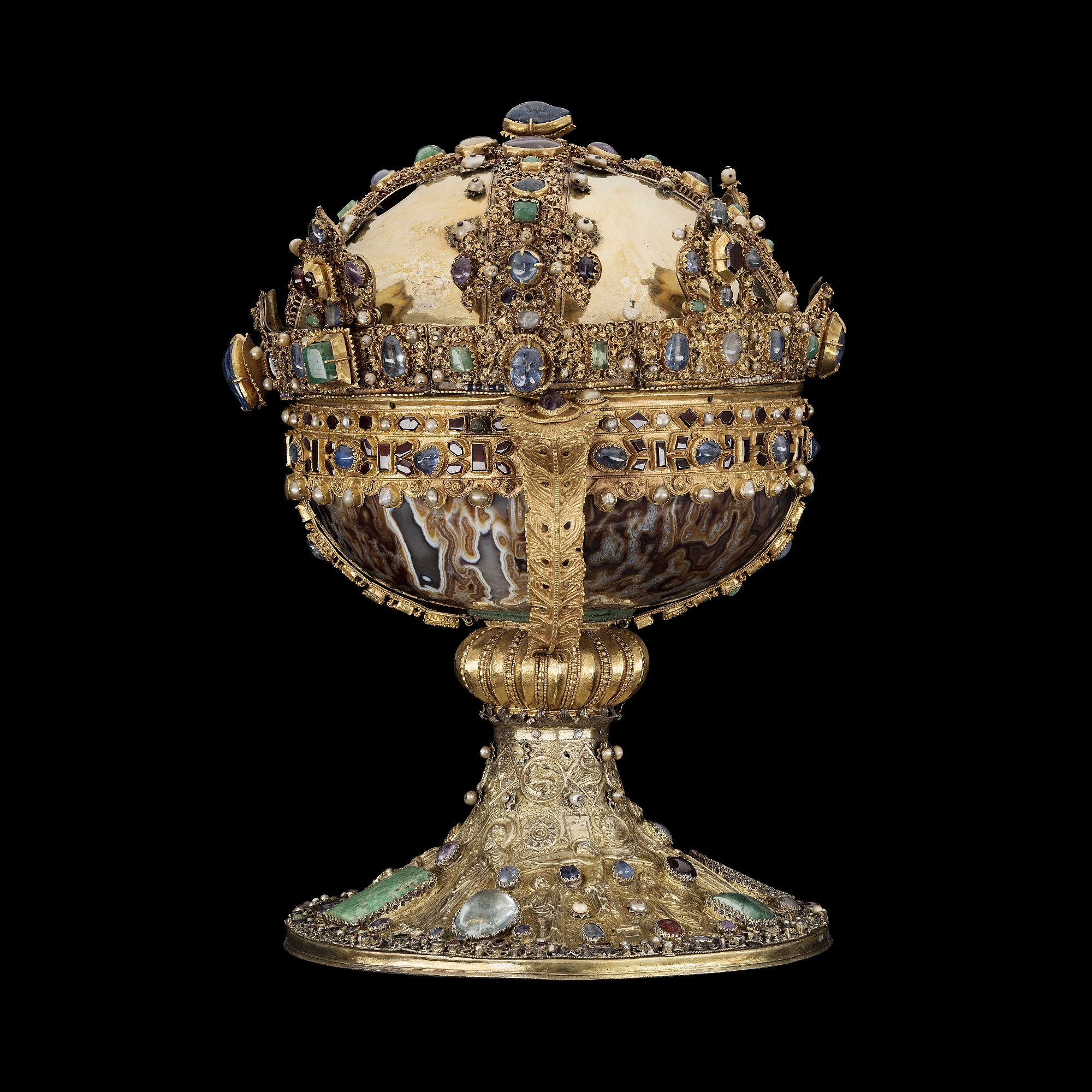
The Reliquary of St. Elizabeth, taken as war booty by the Swedish army during the Thirty Years' War and currently in the Swedish History Museum, Stockholm

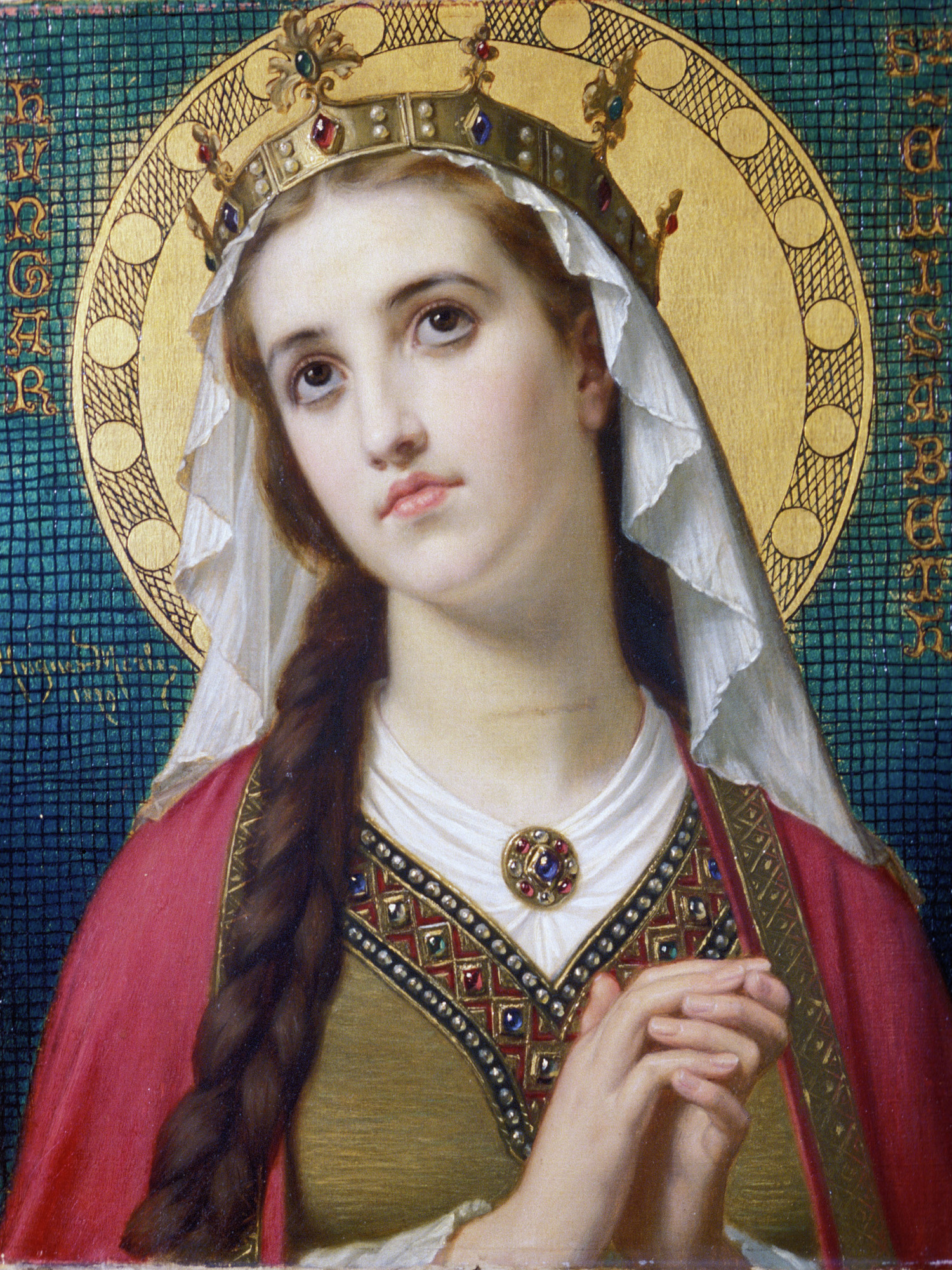
19th-century oil painting depicting Saint Elizabeth by French artist Hugues Merle (1879)

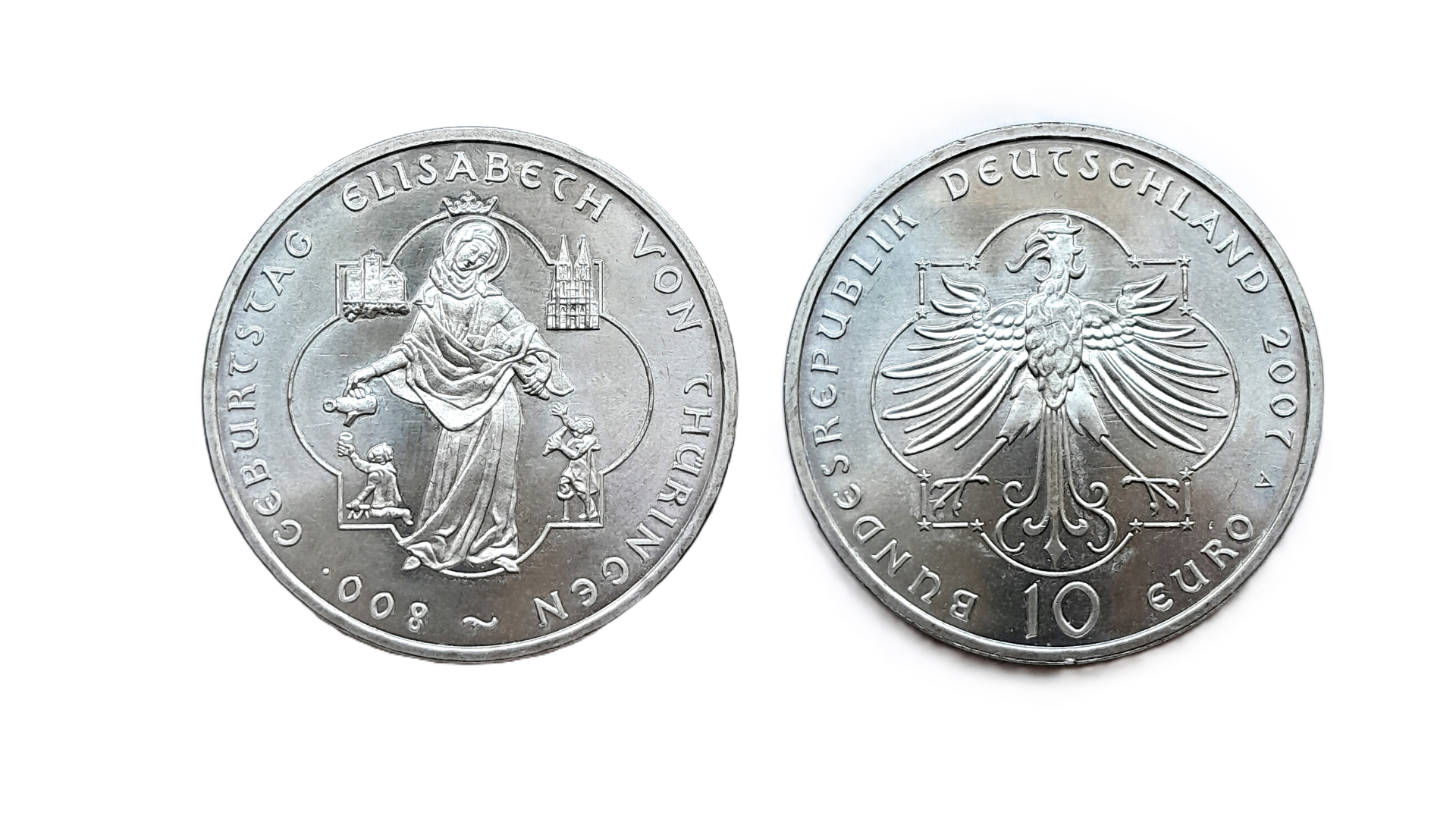
German €10 commemorative coin "800th Birthday of Elisabeth of Thuringia ( Elizabeth of Hungary) " from 2007

== See also ==
- Hungarian nobility
- Isten, hazánkért térdelünk
- Saint Elizabeth of Hungary, patron saint archive
