= Tage Thott =

Tage Thott may refer to:

- Tage Ottesen Thott til Næs (died 1562), Danish councillor, owner of Trollenäs Castle
- Tage Andersen Thott (died 1643), Danish county governor, owner of Jomfruens Egede
- Tage Ottesen Thott til Eriksholm (1580–1658), Danish Member of the Rigsdag, owner of Eriksholm
- Tage Thott (Danish nobleman) (1648–1707), Danish county governor of Scanian
- Tage Thott (Swedish nobleman) (1739–1824), Swedish governor of Malmöhus County
- Tage Thott (Swedish military officer) (1796–1866), Swedish military officer, owner of Skabersjö Castle
- Tage Reedtz-Thott (1839–1923), Danish Minister for Foreign Affairs
- Tage Thott (hovjägmästare) (1852–1921), Swedish hovjägmästare

== See also ==
- Tage (disambiguation)
- Tott, surname article about both Thott and Tott
