= Trolle =

Noble family of Swedish origin

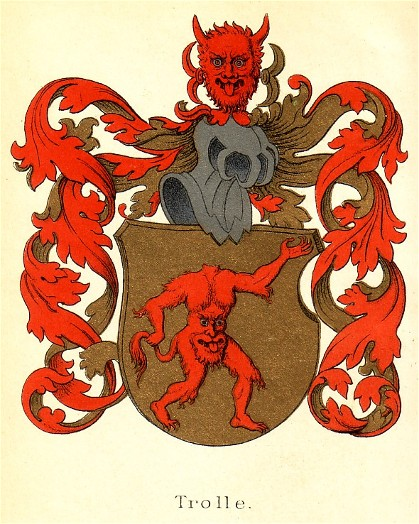
Coat of arms of the Trolle family

The House of Trolle is the name of a noble family, originally from Sweden. The family has produced prominent people in the histories of Sweden and Denmark (where it is sometimes spelled Trold) since the Middle Ages and is associated with several estates in both countries.

== Family history ==
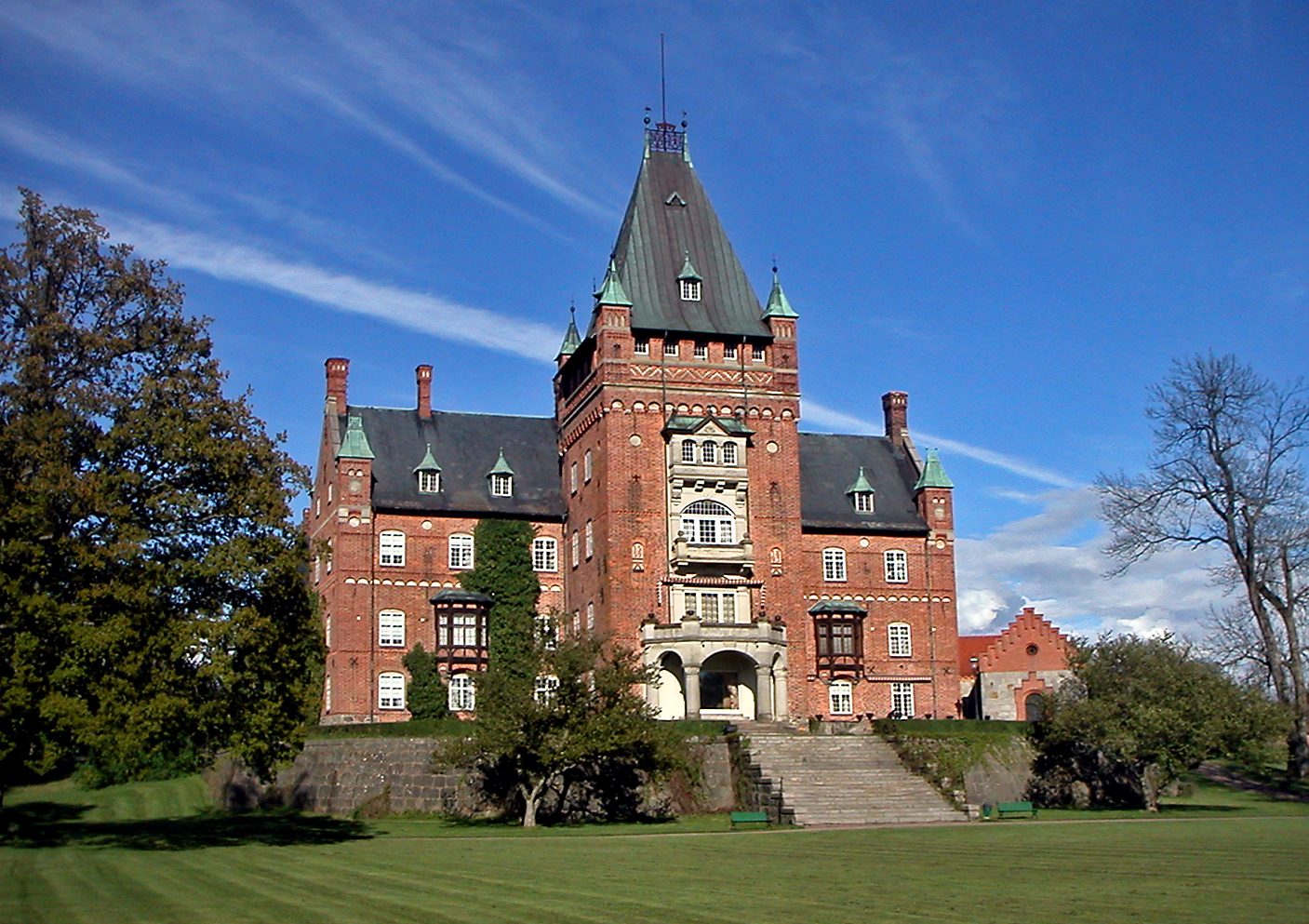
Trollenäs Castle in Eslöv

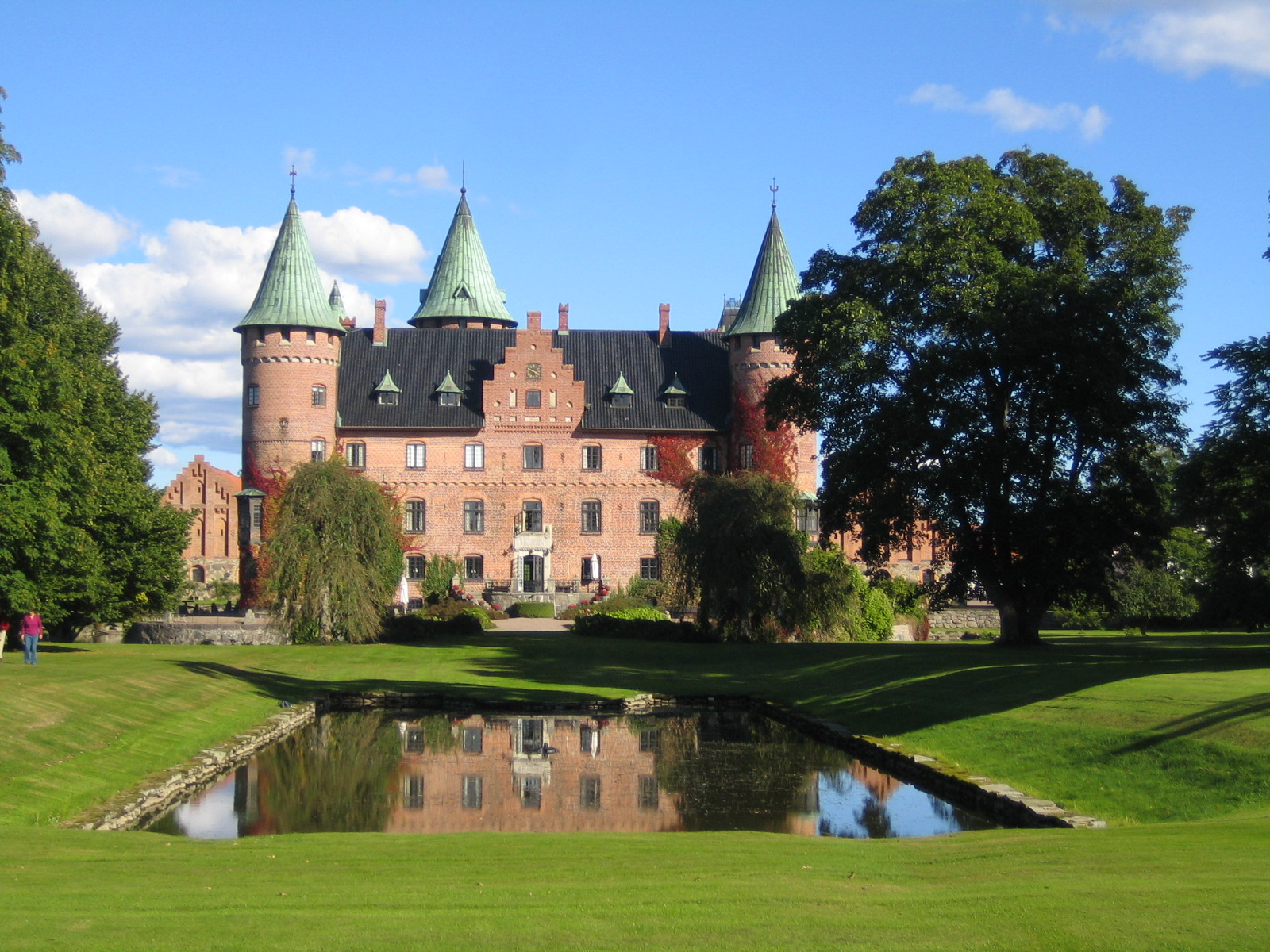
Trolleholm Castle in Svalöv

Historically attested male-line family members are known as far back as the 14th century. The earliest was the knight Birger Knutsson, also known as Birghe Trulle. The earliest known generations held the estate of Bo in Småland, Sweden. Birger Trolle, High Councillor of Sweden, inherited Bergkvara castle from his half-brother Håkan Karlsson.

Arvid Birgersson and Eric Arvidsson were among mightiest in the country and both almost became Regents of Sweden in their time, in competition against the Sture family. Gustav Trolle was Archbishop of Uppsala. The original Swedish line of the family died out in the late 16th century.

Eric's younger half-brother Joachim (d 1546) inherited Lilloe in Skåne from his mother and settled in Denmark. The Danish family line continued through his relations, becoming an important house of high nobility. One of his sons was Danish admiral Herluf Trolle and one of great-grandsons, Niels Trolle (Nils Trolle til Trollesholm og Gavnø), was Statholder of Norway.

Sweden again had a branch of the family when Niels Trolle's son Arvid Nielsen Trold, Lord of Trollenäs Castle, swore loyalty to Sweden (and was in 1689 given a seat among Sweden's nobility) after Skåne, his native land, had become a permanent part of Sweden. The head of the House received in 1816 by primogeniture the hereditary title of baron in Sweden for the House. All currently extant branches of the House of Trolle descend from him; the remaining Danish branches having died out in 1787.

== Coat of arms ==
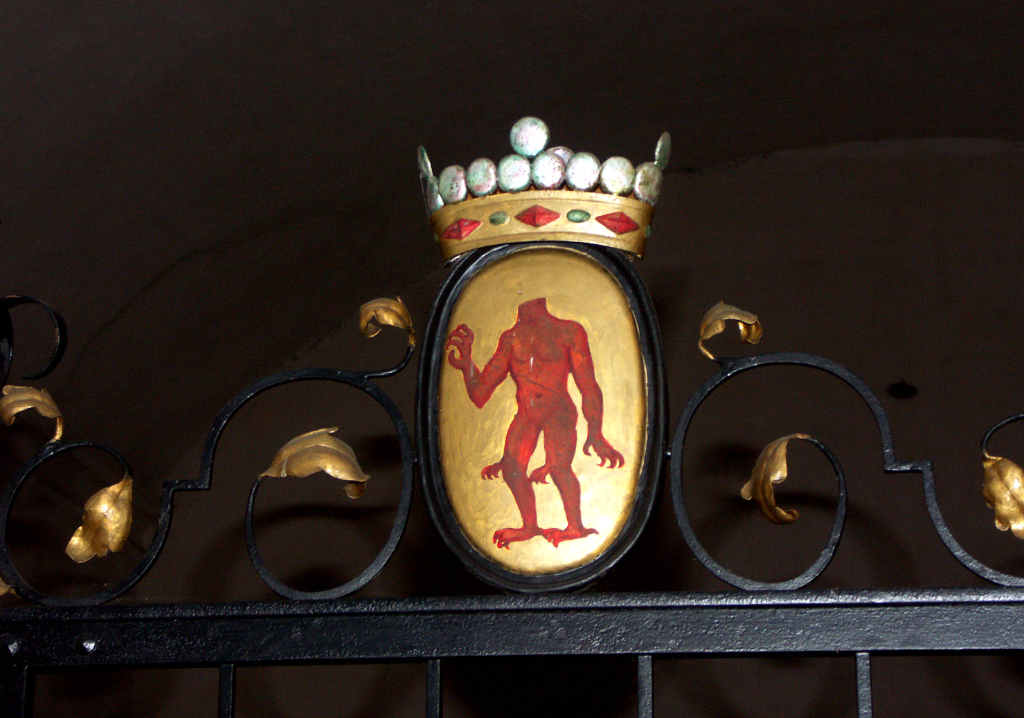
Trolle family coat of arms

== Prominent family members ==
Denmark

- Herluf Trolle (1516–1565), Danish naval hero
- Niels Trolle, vice admiral
- Mette Trolle

Sweden

- Eric Trolle (c. 1460–1530), Swedish Lord High Constable
- Gustav Trolle (1488–1535), Archbishop of Uppsala
- Frederik Trolle (1693-1770) Owner of Trolleholms Castle
- Nils Axel Arvid Carlsson Trolle (1859-1930), Baron of Trollenäs Castle
- Ulf Trolle Managing Director of Trollenäs Gods AB

== See also ==
- Trolleholm Castle
- Trolle-Ljungby Castle
- Trollenäs Castle
