= Erik Trolle =

Elected regent of Sweden (c. 1460 – 1530)

- Born: c. 1460
- Died: 1529 or 1530
- Known for: Elected regent of Sweden in 1512 (never assumed office)
- Spouse(s): Ingeborg Philipsdatter (Thott); Karin Eriksdotter (Gyllenstierna)
- Children: Gustav Trolle; Kristina; Ermegård; Erik; Joakim; Beata; Ingeborg
- Parents: Arvid Trolle (father); Kerstin Jonsdotter (mother)

Erik Trolle (or Erik Arvidsson; c. 1460 – 1529 or 1530) was a Swedish nobleman who was elected regent (riksföreståndare) of Sweden in 1512, during the Kalmar Union, but never assumed office. He was Justiciar of Närke and a member of the Privy Council of Sweden from 1487.

== Biography ==
Erik Arvidsson was born around 1460 into an important family of high nobility and was apparently aiming at a clerical career. Erik's parents were lord Arvid Birgersson Trolle (died 1505) and his first wife Kerstin Jonsdotter (Gädda). His father had connected him to the powerful Thott family by marrying Beate Iversdatter Thott (died 1487) as his second wife in 1466. His last stepmother was his father's third wife Brita Turesdotter Bielke.

Erik studied at the University of Rostock and University of Cologne, had positions as Canon in Uppsala and Linköping but was never ordained. Erik was elected Regent (riksföreståndare) at the meeting of the High Council of Sweden in 1512 upon the death of regent Svante Nilsson, Lord of Ekesiö, but never actually took office, being superseded by Svante's son, the young Sten Sture the Younger.

He married in 1487 the wealthy Ingeborg Philipsdatter (Thott) (died 1495), his stepmother's first cousin, as his first wife and settled on her manor Ekholmen Castle in Uppland. His second wife, from about 1512, was Karin Eriksdotter Gyllenstierna, much his junior, who survived until around 1562. She was a great-granddaughter of King Karl Knutsson. Erik Trolle's son Gustav Trolle (1488–1535) became Archbishop of Uppsala and leader of the Church of Sweden.

== Wives ==
- Ingeborg Philipsdatter Thott (married at Fållnäs 30 September 1487, drowned 1495 in Lake Mälaren)
- Karin Eriksdotter Gyllenstierna (married about 1512, died about or before 12 March 1562)

== Children ==
=== First marriage ===
- Gustav Eriksson Trolle, christened 25 September 1488, died July 1535 a prisoner at Gottorp castle, archbishop
- Ermegård Eriksdotter, drowned in lake Mälaren 1495
- Kristina Eriksdotter, drowned in lake Mälaren 1495
- Erik Eriksson, lived 1511

=== Second marriage ===
- Beata Eriksdotter Trolle, died 13 April 1591 at Steninge, married 1538 Gabriel Kristiernsson Oxenstierna, who became 1st Baron of Mörby and Steninge (died 1585)
- Ingeborg Eriksdotter Trolle, died 1590, married 13 January 1544 Niels Eriksen Ryning, Lord of Lagnoe and Gimmersta (died 1578)

either first or second marriage:

- Joakim Eriksson Trolle

Erik Trolle House of Trolle Born: 1460 Died: 1530
Political offices
Preceded by Svante Nilsson	Regent of Sweden; 1512	Succeeded by Sten Sture the Younger
