= Näs Church, Skåne =

Näs Church
- Näs kyrka
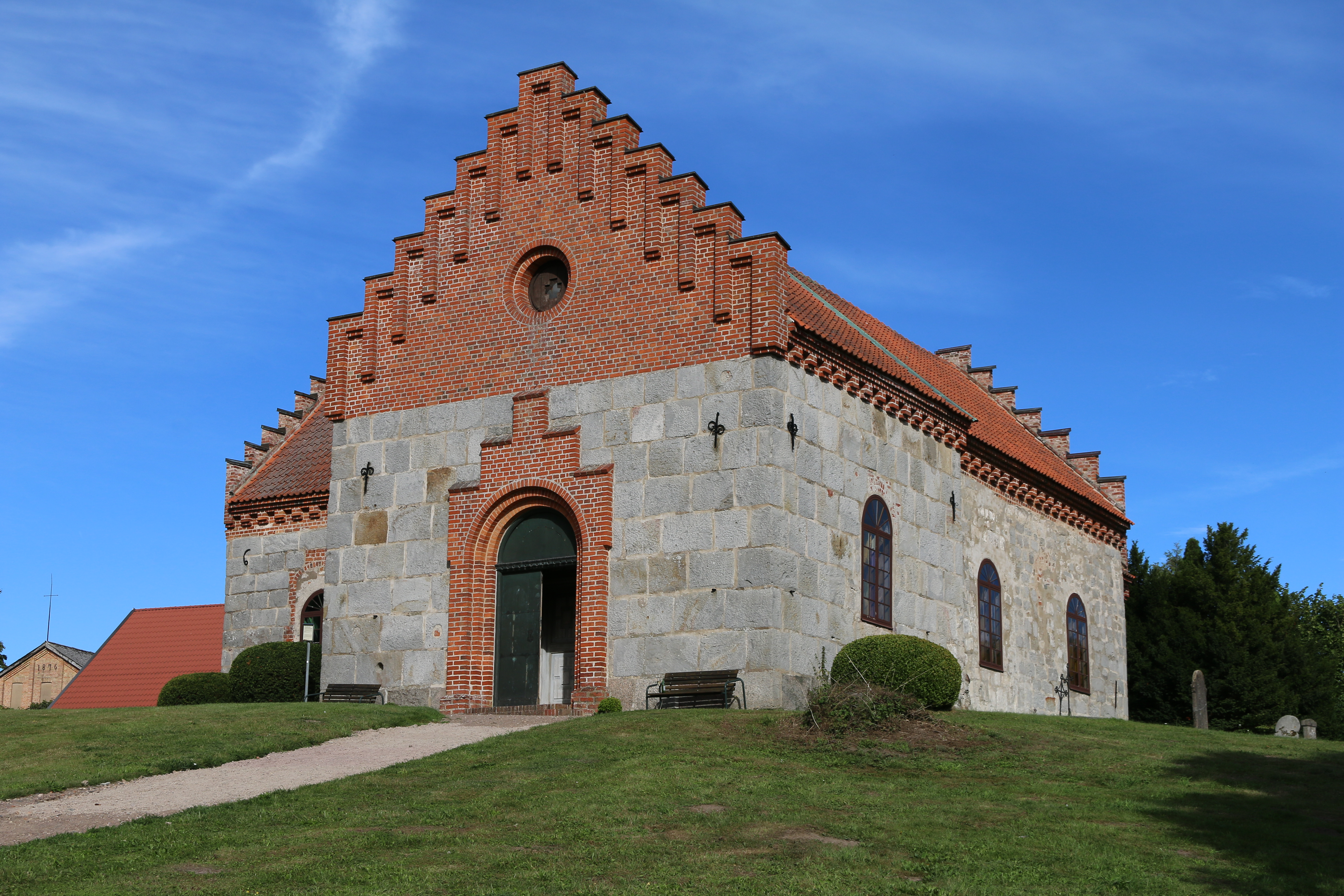
- Näs Church

- Location within Skåne Location within Sweden Location within Europe
- 55°51′56″N 13°14′43″E
- Country: Sweden
- Denomination: Church of Sweden

Näs Church (Swedish: Näs kyrka) is a medieval church adjacent to Trollenäs Castle, Eslöv Municipality in the province of Skåne, Sweden.

== History and architecture ==
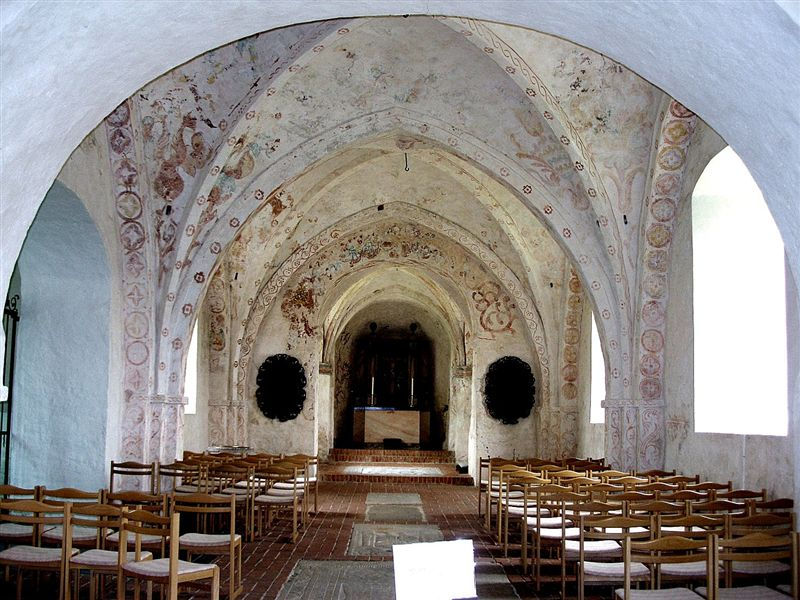
Näs Church, view of the interior

Näs Church was built during the second half of the 12th century. It originally consisted of a nave, chancel and an apse. During the 15th century a church porch was added and the ceilings replaced by decorated vaults. In 1600 a burial chapel was added for the families Tott and Rosencrantz, lords of nearby Trollenäs Castle. A tower, later demolished, was constructed in 1641. The church contains fragmentary remains of medieval murals from several different periods. Among the furnishings, the oldest is the baptismal font that dates from the 12th century and was originally made for another church. The altarpiece is from 1771. The church was used as a parish church until 1861, when a new church was built nearby (Trollenäs kyrka). Näs Church was abandoned and used as storage until 1928, when it was re-consecrated following a restoration.
