= Svante Nilsson (regent of Sweden) =

Swedish nobleman (c. 1460 – 1512)

- Riksföreståndare
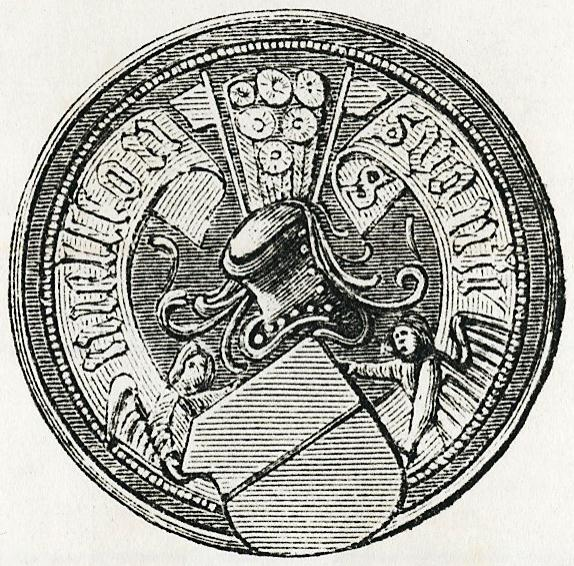
- Seal of Svante Nilsson
- Reign: 21 January 1504 – 2 January 1512
- Predecessor: Sten Sture the Elder
- Successor: Eric Trolle
- Born: c. 1460; Penningby Castle, Norrtälje, Uppland
- Died: 2 January 1512; Arboga, Västmanland
- Spouse: Iliana Gisladotter Gädda; Mette Ivarsdotter Dyre
- Issue: Sten Sture the Younger
- House: Natt och Dag
- Father: Nils Bosson Sture
- Mother: Birgitta Bonde

Svante Nilsson (c. 1460 – 2 January 1512) was a Swedish nobleman and regent of Sweden from 1504 to 1512. He was the father of Sten Sture the Younger (1493–1520), who later served as regent of Sweden during the era of the Kalmar Union.

== Biography ==
Svante was born at Penningby Castle (Penningby slott), at Norrtälje in Uppland, the son of Nils Bosson Sture (c. 1426 – 1494). Nils belonged to the Natt och Dag dynasty, but took the surname Sture from his maternal grandfather Sven Sture. Svante himself never used the surname Sture, but his son Sten later adopted it in order to associate himself with the memory of Sten Sture the Elder (who, confusingly, was unrelated to Sven Sture but was nevertheless a distant cousin of Svante's through the Natt och Dag line). Svante's mother was Birgitta Tordsdotter Bonde (1439–1494), a member of the Bonde family and cousin of King Karl VIII.

Svante became a member of the Privy Council of Sweden no later than 1482, but acted in opposition to his distant kinsman Sten Sture the Elder, going as far as supporting King John of Denmark. Unwillingly he then switched sides and supported Sten Sture in overthrowing the king. When Sten Sture died in 1503, Svante became head of state in January 1504. His resignation was demanded by the Privy Council of Sweden in the summer of 1511, on the grounds that he had neglected the defense on the occasion of Danish ravages. In practice he remained in power until his death at Arboga on 2 January 1512. Svante Nilsson was buried in Västerås Cathedral.

His first marriage in 1486 was with Iliana Gisladotter Gädda. Through this marriage he was the father of future statesman and regent of Sweden, Sten Sture the Younger (1493–1520). He married a second time in 1504 with Mette Dyre (c. 1465 – before 1533).

== Other sources ==
Svante Nilsson Sture Born: 1460 Died: 2 January 1512
Regnal titles
| Preceded by Sten Sture the Elder | Regent of Sweden; 1504–1512 | Succeeded by Eric Trolle |
