= Sten Sture =

Sten Sture may refer to:

- Sten Sture the Elder (1440–1503), Swedish statesman and regent of Sweden 1470–1497 and 1501–1503.
- Sten Sture the Younger (1493–1520), Swedish statesman and regent of Sweden, during the era of the Kalmar Union.
