= Sten of Sweden =

Sten of Sweden may refer to:

- Sten Sture the Elder, Regent of Sweden 1470
- Sten Sture the Younger, Regent of Sweden 1512
- Sten, Prince of Sweden 1546, son of King Gustav I (died in infancy)
