= Mette Dyre =

Danish noble

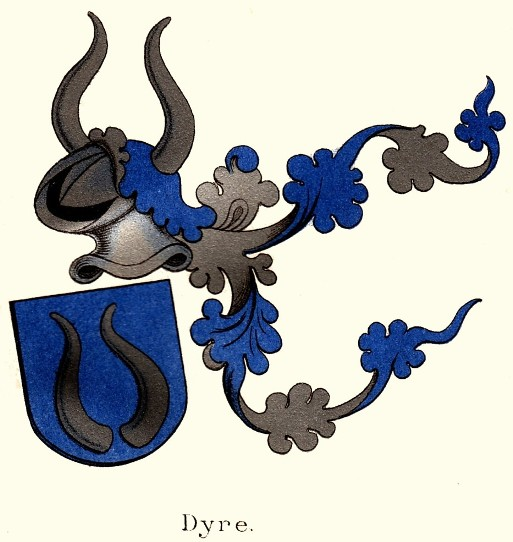
Coat of arms of the Dyre family.

Mette Iversdotter Dyre (Swedish: Mätta or Märta Ivarsdotter; c. 1465 – c. before 1533) was a Danish noble, nominal sheriff and chancellor. She was married three times to powerful men: two royal councillors and finally Svante, Regent of Sweden. As such, she was a de facto queen consort. Mette Dyre is credited with political influence on the affairs of state through her spouse.

== Early life ==
Mette Iversdatter was born at Tirsbæk in Jutland in Denmark. She was the daughter of the Danish knight Iver Jenssen Dyre (d. ca. 1463) and Kristine Pedersdatter Oxe (d. after 1503). In ca. 1483, she married the Norwegian knight and riksråd Anders van Bergen (d. 1491). With her first spouse, she had her only child to reach adulthood, her daughter Christina Andersdatter.

In 1496, she married secondly to the Norwegian-Swedish noble Knut Alvsson Tre Rosor (d. 1502), who was a Norwegian riksråd and the fiefholder of Akershus Fortress in Oslo. In 1499, Knut Alfsson lost his position in Norway, and she followed him to Sweden. In Sweden, the couple allied themselves with Svante Sture: he was at that time not yet Regent of Sweden, but a leading member of the Swedish party who wished to dissolve the union between Sweden and Denmark-Norway.

In 1501, supported by Sture, Knut Alfsson invaded Norway in an attempt to unite Sweden and Norway against King Hans. Mette remained in Sweden at Svante's fiefdom Stegeborg Castle. Initially successful, Knut Alfsson was murdered by Henrik Krummedige during a parley.

In collaboration with Svante Sture, Mette continued the work of her late spouse, and maintained negotiations with Norwegian representatives through correspondence from her base in Sweden in an attempt to convince them to ally Norway with Sweden against Denmark. King Hans of Denmark accused her of having sent out letters to encourage the Norwegian peasantry to rebel against him.

== Regent consort ==
On 17 November 1504 in Stockholm, she married thirdly to her ally Svante Nilsson, Regent of Sweden, after he had been elected Regent the preceding January. Mette and Svante had by that date been rumoured to be lovers for at least a year previously.

While nominally in union with Denmark, Sweden was de facto an independent Kingdom with Svante as King in all but title, and Mette in the position as queen consort as the senior lady of the Swedish court: she fulfilled the same role as normally a queen consort, acting as a mediator for supplicants to her husband, and was referred to as "Princess" by officials.

Mette was described as the loyal adviser of Regent Svante, and took an active part in the management of state affairs. A correspondence of about 40 preserved letters between Mette and Svante illustrates their close cooperation in politics, as well as their personal devotion to each other.

In 1507, Mette served as the commander of Stockholm during the absence of Svante. In 1510, she served as the messenger and representative of Svante on a mission to Finland.

Her political involvement made her a target of slander. She was rumored to have been involved in the death of Svante's predecessor Sten Sture the Elder, so that her lover and later husband Svante could succeed as regent.

In 1512 Svante died. The news was kept from her and she was prevented from seeing him. She was told that he was unavailable, and not informed that he was dead until her stepson, Sten Sture the Younger, had arrived to the castle and secured the regency for himself.

Mette did not have a good relationship with her stepson. He accused her of having stolen gold and silver that he considered a part of his inheritance from his own mother. He confiscated the land given to Mette as a dower upon her marriage to his late father. After three years of dispute between Mette and her stepson, he offered her a large sum of money as settlement.

== Sheriff and chancellor ==
In 1515, Mette left Sweden for Denmark, where she appealed for the support of king Christian II of Denmark against Sten Sture the Younger in the dispute between her and her stepson about the inheritance of her late spouse, as Christian II was nominally the king of Sweden as well.

Christian II was unable to assist her in her dispute, but he appointed her sheriff, or (Lensmann) of the Bishopal Fief of Hørby near Holbæk, and Chancellor of St. Agnes' Priory, Roskilde. As lensmann, she would have held general governing power over her fief, been in final command of its military and collected its taxes. She kept these positions until her death.

In 1516, Mette and her three nephews, whose lands had also been confiscated by Sten Sture the Younger, collaborated in financing a pirate ship, and used it to take a ship belonging to the Swedish Regent and the Hanseatic League on the Trave river. This incident contributed to the final open break between Denmark and Sweden the following year.

Mette died sometime between 1527 and 1533. The inheritance dispute between Mette Dyre and Sten Sture the Younger was not to be finally settled until 1541.

== Other sources ==
- Sv.E. Green-Pedersen (red.): Profiler i nordisk senmiddelalder og renaissance, 1983 (In Danish)
- Gudrun Utterström: Fem skrivare, 1968 (In Danish)
- Privatarkiv i Sturearkivet i RA, Stockholm (In Danish)
- Dansk Biografisk Leksikon (In Danish)

== Succession ==
Mette Dyre Born: 1465 Died: before 1533
Preceded by Ingeborg Åkesdotter Tott as Regent consort	Regent consort of Sweden; 1504–1512	Succeeded by Christina Gyllenstierna as Regent consort
