= King's Own Regiment =

The King's Own Regiment may refer to:

- King's Own Royal Regiment (active 1680–1959), line infantry regiment of the British Army
- 2nd King's Own Regiment of Horse (active 1685–1959), cavalry regiment of the British Army
- King's Own Enlisted Regiment (active 1719–1829), enlisted infantry regiment of the Royal Swedish Army
- King's Own Calgary Regiment (active 1910–present), armoured cavalry regiment of the Canadian Army
- King's Own Malta Regiment (active 1932–1972), territorial infantry regiment on the British Army colonial list prior to Malta's independence
- 56th (King's Own) Anti-Tank Regiment (active 1938–1961), territorial army unit of the British Army's Royal Artillery
- King's Own Royal Border Regiment (active 1959–2006), line infantry regiment of the British Army
