= Tage Thott (Swedish nobleman) =

Swedish nobleman, civil servant and military officer (1739–1824)

His Excellency High Well-born Count Tage Thott Lord of the Realm KmstkVO LFS
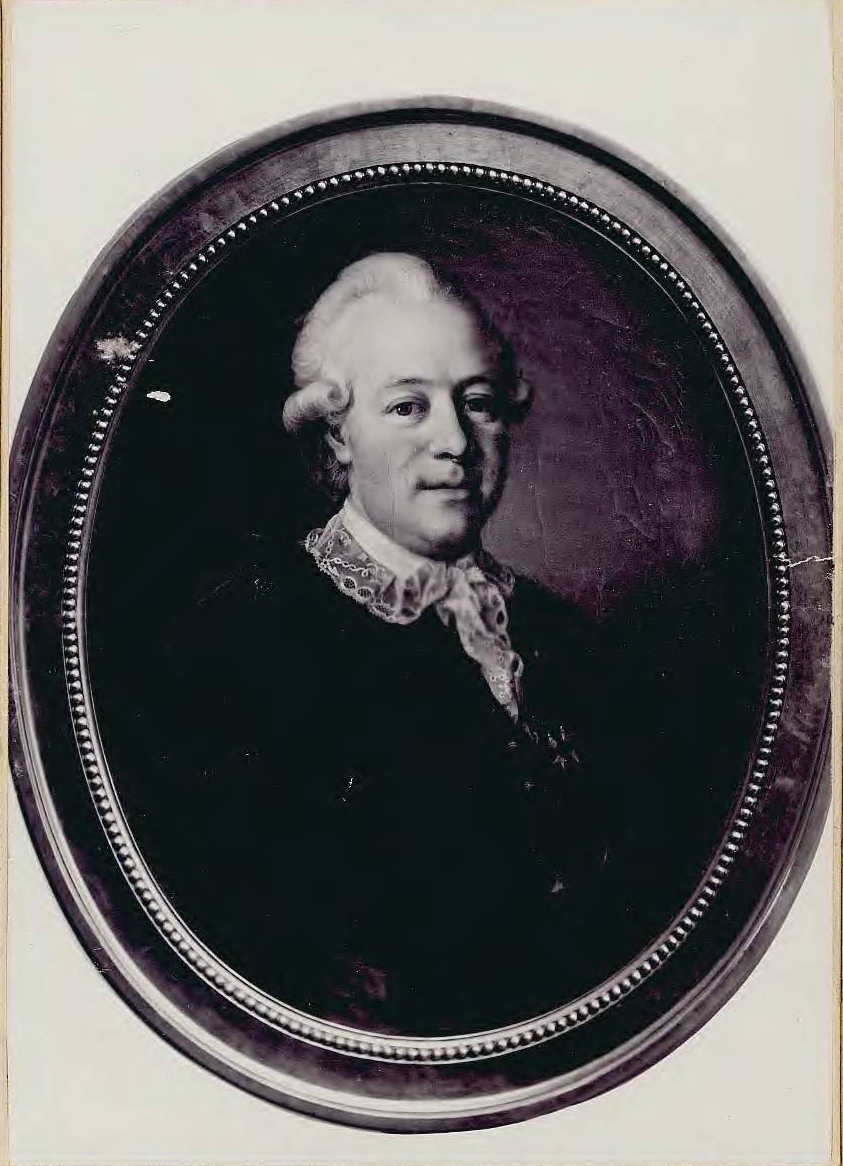

Governor of Malmöhus County
- In office 1776–1794
- Preceded by: Bengt Gustaf Frölich
- Succeeded by: Gustaf Fredrik von Rosen

Personal details
- Born: Tage Tott; 20 October 1739 Skabersjö Castle, Scania, Kingdom of Sweden
- Died: 7 March 1824 (aged 84) Malmö, Scania, Kingdom of Sweden
- Spouse: Ulrika Christina Barnekow (m. 1763)
- Children: 7, including Christian and Otto
- Relatives: Tott family
- Education: Lund University

Military service
- Allegiance: Kingdom of Sweden
- Branch/service: King's Own Enlisted Regiment
- Rank: Lieutenant-colonel
- Battles/wars: Pomeranian War

Tage Ottosen Thott (spelled Tott before 1778; 20 October 1739 – 7 March 1824) was a Swedish nobleman, civil servant and military officer.

== Biography ==
He was the son of Otto Tott and his wife Christina Kaas. In 1756, he graduated from Lund University with a candidate of law degree. A year later, he joined the King's Own Enlisted Regiment and fought in the Pomeranian War. He quickly rose through the ranks, being promoted in 1772 to lieutenant-colonel. Between 1774 and 1775 and 1776–1794, he held office as Vice-Governor and Governor of Malmöhus County respectively. He lived at Skabersjö Castle following his retirement.

During his time, he was one of the largest landowners in Scania. He supposedly lived a debauched life in his youth, which made any parliamentary offices or duties impossible. However, he tried to redeem himself later in life. By proving his loyalty to the King during the Coup of 1772 and having influential associates, he became a favourite of Gustavus III, King of Sweden.

In 1778 and 1807, he was raised to baronial and comital peerages respectively, and adopted Thott as the new family name. In 1776, he became a member of the Royal Physiographic Society of Lund, and was elected its president three years later. On 25 January 1763 in Widtsköfle, he married Ulrika Christina Barnekow. They had seven children, including Christian and Otto.
