= Arvid Trolle =

Swedish magnate and politician (c. 1440 – 1505)

Arvid Birgersson, Lord of Bergkvara (c. 1440 – 20 February 1505) was a Swedish magnate and politician in the last decades of Middle Ages. He was justiciar of Östergötland and then of Tiohärad, as well as a Lord High Councillor of Sweden, and once a candidate for Regent. His family coat of arms depict a headless troll whereby some have retrospectively called him Arvid Trolle.

== Biography ==
Arvid Birgersson was born as second son of Birger Birgersson of Bergkvara, Bo and Lillö and his wife Kristina Knutsdotter (Aspenäsätten). His elder brother Erik Birgersson was murdered in Lübeck in 1459 which left Arvid as the heir of their family estate.

In 1460s, Arvid sympathized and somewhat supported King Charles VIII of Sweden (Karl Knutsson (Bonde)) in his opposition against the Kalmar Union. He was married with Beata Ivarsdotter, daughter of Ivar Axelsson Tott of Lilloe in Skåne, fiefholder of Gotland, who was in almost open opposition against Danish central government. Ivar Axelsson Tott was King Charles chief ally in late 1460s, had once been promised succession after him by King Charles, but Charles' nephew Sten Sture the Elder managed to wrest the regentship. Iver supported Arvid's election to regent to replace Sten Sture. They succeeded once in a coup at Stockholm, after which the Swedish High Council chose Arvid, but they soon lost their base to Sten Sture who had the support of burghers and peasantry.

In 1487, Ivar Axelsson Tott died and his daughter Beata Ivarsdotter inherited his lands in Skåne. Beata died soon thereafter and her sizable inheritance became property of the couple's underage children, under guardianship of Arvid.

After Arvid's third marriage with Birgita Turesdotter, daughter of High Constable Ture Turesson (Bielke), the leading union-supporter in Sweden, Arvid took a clear stance in support of union with Denmark.

Arvid was a leader of the 1497 rebellion against the regency of Sten Sture, which led to enthronement of King Hans of Denmark as ruler of Sweden, and the regency was abolished for four years. In 1501 Swedes revolted against King Hans and Sten Sture returned to regency. Arvid had to flee to Denmark. He died in 1505 at Lillö Castle (Lillø slott) in eastern Scania and was buried in Lund Cathedral.

Arvid was his era's major landowner within Scandinavia. Almost 1000 manors in Sweden were in his allodial possession. Additionally he received over 475 manors in Eastern Denmark jure uxoris upon the death of his second wife's father Ivar Axelsson Tott in 1487. He also held as fief counties of Nyköping, Stegeborg and Borgholm.

== Personal life ==
Arvid Birgersson married three times:

- Kerstin Jonsdotter of Fållnäs (family of Gädda), married ca. 1459, died before 1465
- Beata Ivarsdotter of Lilloe (Skånish family of Tott) married 1466, died 1487
- Birgita Turesdotter of Kråkerum (family of Bielke), married 23 September 1488, died 1513

He had children from all his three marriages. Eric Trolle (1460-1529) was his son by his first wife. Archbishop Gustav Trolle was his grandson through Eric, and Admiral Herluf Trolle was Arvid's grandson through the second wife.
