= Bergkvara, Växjö =

Manor house and castle ruins in Sweden

Coordinates: 56°52′5″N 14°43′27″E

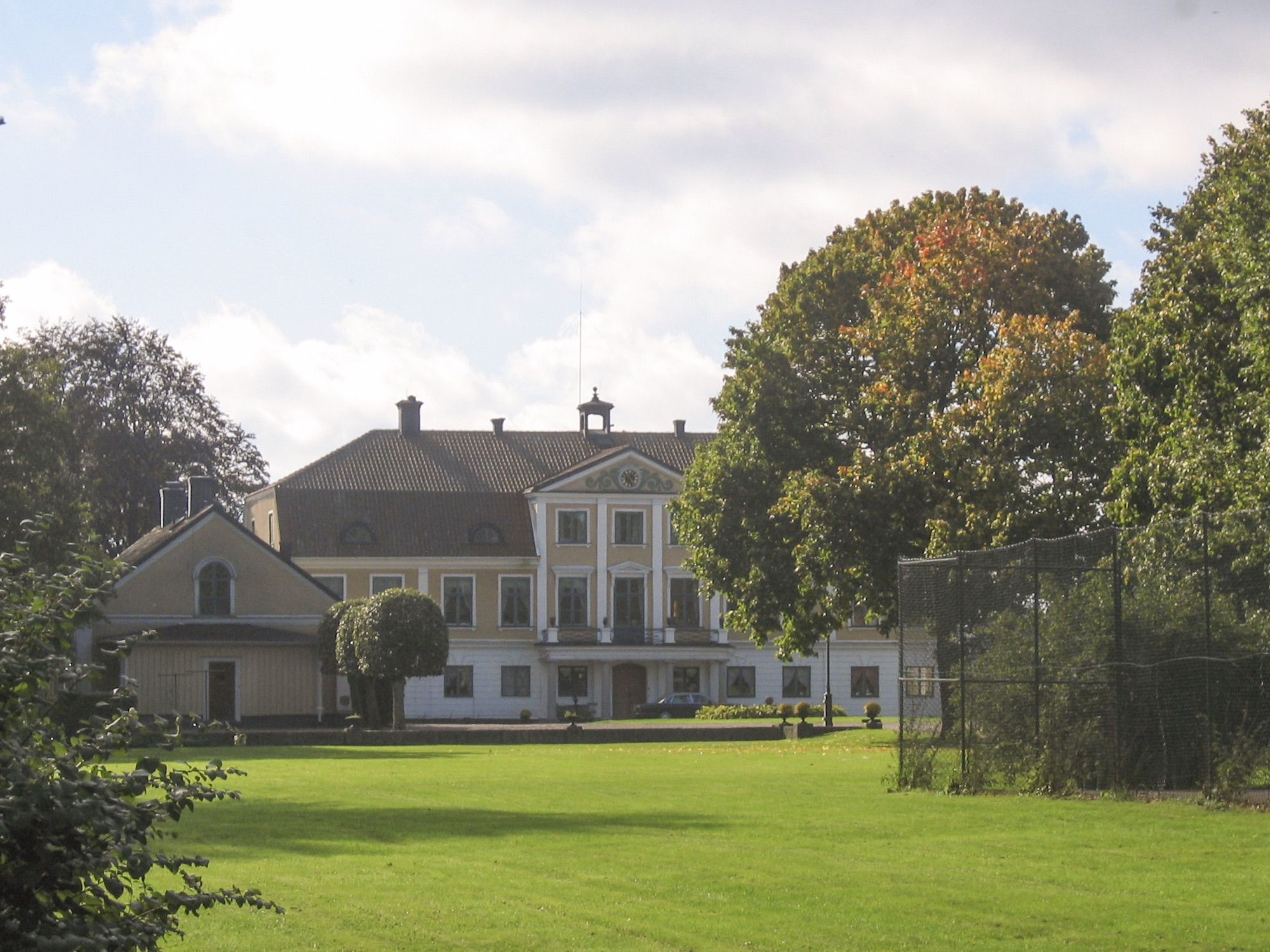
The main building from 1794.

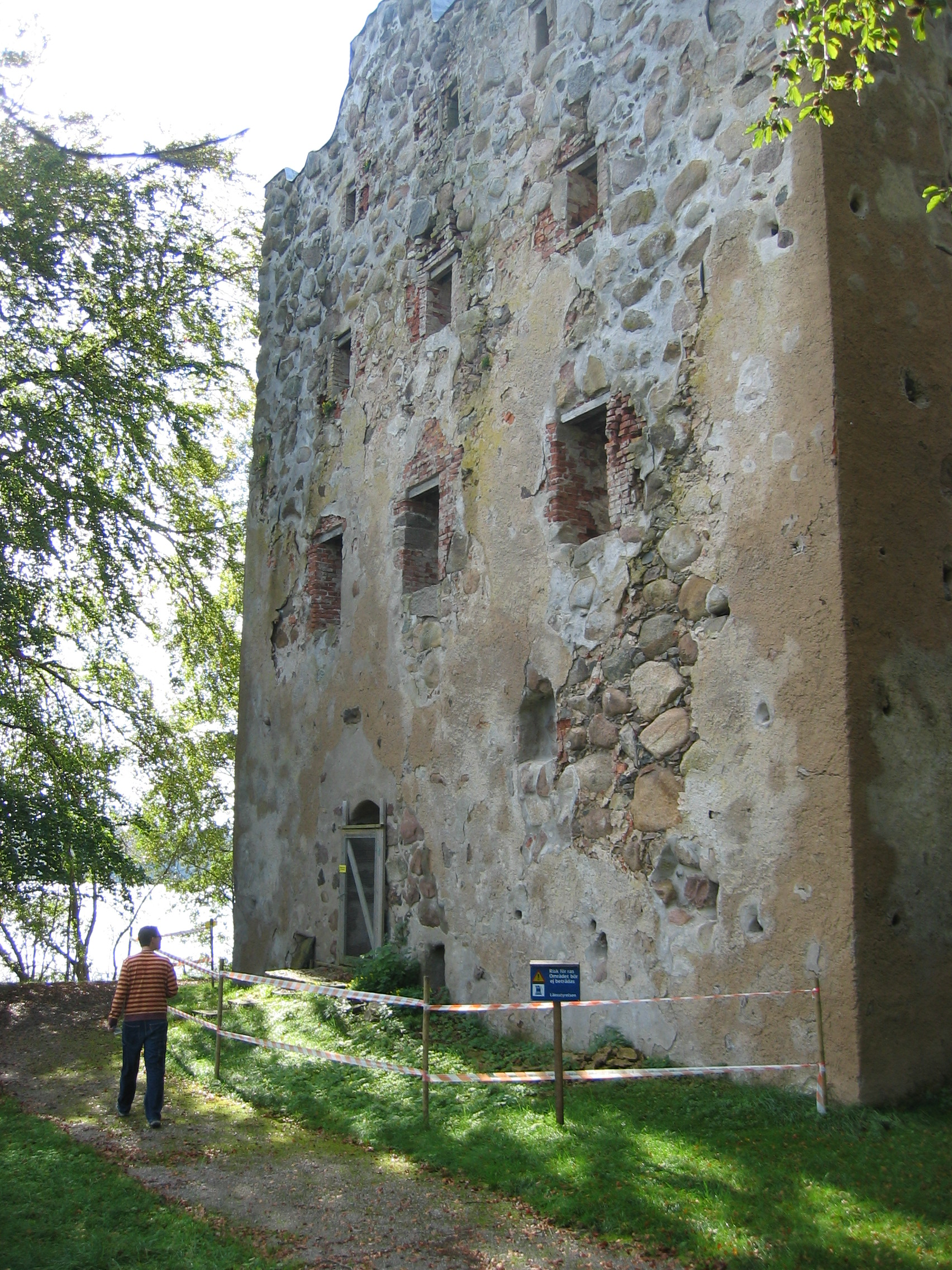
Ruins of Bergkvara Castle (photo taken in 2006).

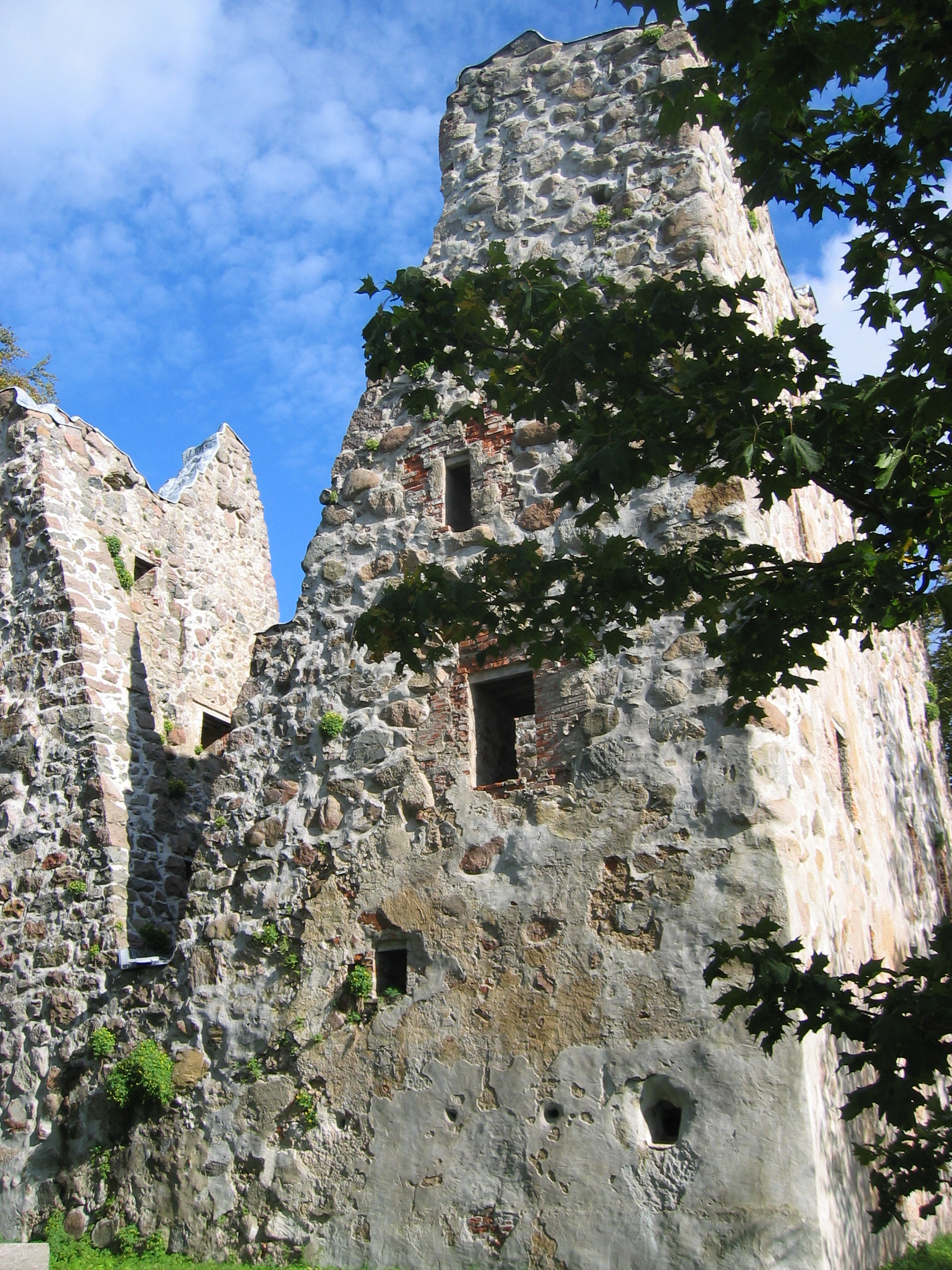
Ruins of Bergkvara Castle (photo taken in 2006).

Bergkvara is a manor house and ruined castle (slottsruin), located at the north beach of Bergkvarasjön ("the Bergkvara Lake") in Växjö, Sweden, and described in Nordisk familjebok as "one of Sweden's oldest mansions in Värend, Bergunda and Öjaby parishes, Kinnevalds district and Kronoberg County, 6 km. west of Växjö".

== History ==
Bergkvara, a former "ornamental landscape", was bought by the Trolle family in the 15th century and rebuilt as a stone castle in the 1470s by Arvid Trolle. The castle was originally surrounded by two moats, serving as a system of defense. In the late 17th century, the inner moat had been partly filled and served as a fishpond while the outer moat served more as a ditch marking the limit of the castle bailey. By this time the residence had moved to the outer moat, as the tower house had lost its original function.

In 1542, the castle was ransacked, plundered and set on fire after a long siege during the Dacke War (Dackefejden) by the peasant revolt of Nils Dacke, and became ruined in the 18th century. In late 18th century, a new main building was under construction and finished in 1794.
