= Tage (disambiguation) =

Tage is a Scandinavian masculine given name.

Tage may also refer to:

- French cruiser Tage, launched 1886
- French ship Tage, launched 1847
- Lake Tage, in Indonesia

== See also ==
- Tages (disambiguation)
