= Tott =

Coat of arms of Tott family

The Tott family or Thott is a prominent Swedish noble family, whose members occupied many important positions in Sweden and Denmark. Notable people with the surname include:

- Åke Henriksson Tott (1598–1640), Swedish nobleman, soldier and politician
- Birgitte Thott (1610–1662), Danish translator, writer and feminist
- Brita Tott (15th century), Swedish noble and spy
- Clara Tott (c. 1440 – 1520), German artist
- Clas Åkesson Tott (c. 1530–1590), Swedish Field Marshal
- Clas Åkesson Tott the Younger (1630–1674), field marshal, Governor-General of Swedish Livonia and Ambassador in France
- Erik Axelsson Tott (c. 1419 – 1481), Dano-Swedish statesman
- François Baron de Tott (1733–1793), French-Slovak officer and aristocrat
- Hanne Tott (1771–1826), Danish circus performer
- Ingeborg Tott (1440s–1507), Queen consort of Sweden
- Otto Thott
- Otto Thott Fritzner Müller
- Sophie de Tott (1758–1848), French artist
- Tage Thott (disambiguation), multiple persons, including
  - Tage Thott (Danish nobleman) (1648–1707), Danish (Scanian) gehejmeråd
  - Tage Thott (Swedish nobleman) (1739–1824), Swedish Governor of Malmöhus County
  - Tage Reedtz-Thott (1839–1923), Danish Minister for Foreign Affairs

== See also ==
- Toth alias Soky, initially known as Tott alias Soky
