= Tage Thott (Danish nobleman) =

Danish county governor, judge and landowner (1648–1707)

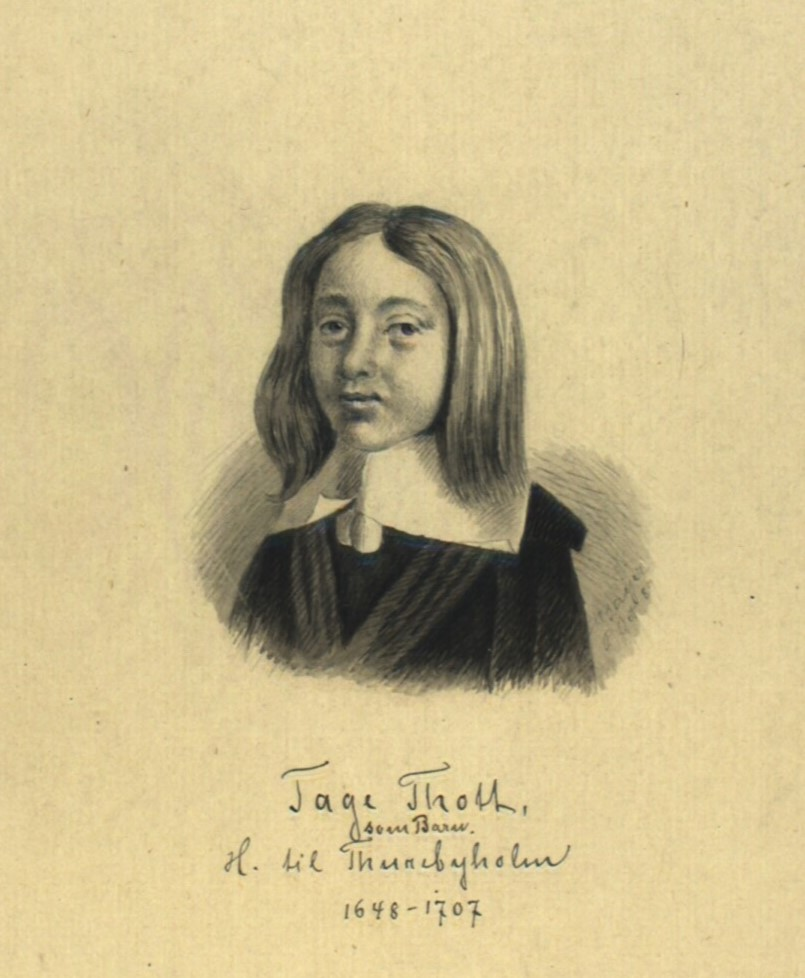
Tage Thott

Tage Thott (5 September 1648 – 23 February 1707) was a Danish county governor, judge and landowner. He was the father of minister of state Otto Thott.

== Early life and education ==
Thott was born on 5 September 1648 at Søfte, Scania, the son of Otto Thott (died1656) and Dorte Holgersdatter Rosenkrantz. He was the half-brother of Knud Thott. He inherited Mogensstrup and Eriksholm from his father. After Denmark's loss of Scania to Sweden, he was appointed chamberlain by the Swedish queen dowager. During the Scanian War, in 1677, he chose to flee to Denmark. He was subsequently sentenced to the loss of honour, life and estate in Sweden. He therefore chose to stay in Denmark.

== Career ==
On 6 March 1683, he was appointed county governor of Holbæk. On 6 May 1692, he was also appointed district judge of Zealand and Møn. Occasionally, he also served as acting county governor of Sorø and Ringsted. In 1699, he was appointed Supreme Court justice.

== Awards ==
On 29 December 1703, he was appointed Geheimeraad. On 11 October 1704, he was created a Knight of the Order of the Dannebrog.

== Personal life and property ==
In Monrad's memoirs, Thot is mentioned as being engaged to Monrad's later wife Mette Sofie Krabbe. On 28 September 1696, Thott was instead married to Petra Sofie Eedtz (1675–1720). She was the daughter of chancellor Peder Frederiksen Reedtz (1614–1674) and Anne Ramel. This brought him into possession of the estate Turebyholm. Back in 1681, he purchased Vognserup from Helle Rosenkrantz (née Trolle), but he had already sold it again in 1686.

Thott died on 23 February 1707. He was the father of later minister of state Otto Thott.
