= Tages (disambiguation) =

Tages may refer to:

- Tages, a founding prophet of Etruscan religion
- Tagès, a software copyright protection system
- Tages (band)
- Tages-Anzeiger, a Swiss newspaper
- Erynnis tages, a butterfly
- Tagetes, a plant genus
