= Swedish military uniforms =

Uniforms worn by the Swedish Armed Forces

The Swedish Armed Forces have an extensive history, during which it has undergone changes in both the equipment and military uniforms it uses.

The current combat uniform system used by the Swedish military is the Fältuniform M90 (English: Field Uniform M90) and it applies the M90 camouflage pattern.

== Combat uniforms ==
=== 20th Century ===
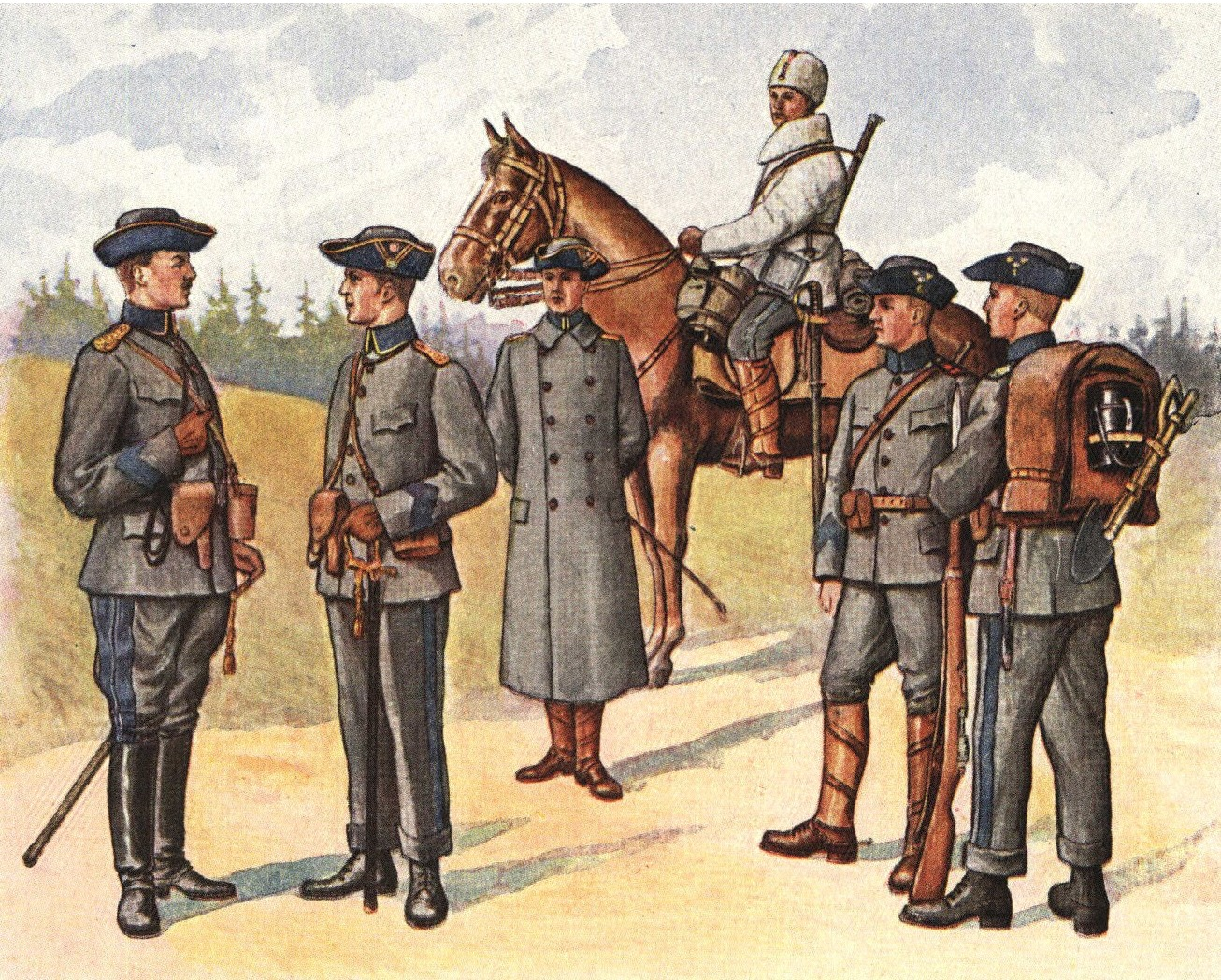
Depiction of Swedish Army uniforms in 1910

==== m/1906 ====
The m/1906 consisted of a jacket, trousers, a greatcoat, and a tricorne hat; All in gray except for blue trouser stripes on each side. Both the jacket and greatcoat lacked shoulder straps and had decorative chevrons above the sleeves along with branch insignia on the right arm.

==== m/1910 ====
The m/1910 was the finalized version of the previous uniform, with minor modifications present. The most notable changes were the addition of shoulder straps, removal of branch insignia on the arm and removal of chevrons from greatcoats. For winter the white m/1909 hat and m/1913 coat were introduced.

==== m/1923 ====
After the First World War the new m/1923 uniform was developed, the tricorne was replaced with a new peaked cap and the uniform now had high standing collars and no longer had blue shoulder straps or chevrons.

==== m/1939 ====
After the outbreak of the second world war the m/1939 was introduced with a turn down collar instead of the previous high collar designs. Furthermore, m/1940 white ski jacket and trousers were introduced.

==== m/1942 KV ====
The m/1942 KV was the first standard field uniform for women, the design was based on the m/1939 uniform and included an armband which was different depending on the organization they are part of until 1946 when the practice was ended. During the 1950s the m/1957 KV uniform was adopted to complement the m/1942 KV which included a new blouse, skirt and jacket.

==== m/1958 ====
The m/1958 uniform was designed for the use specifically as a winter uniform with its counterpart m/1959 uniform being the summer uniform. Unlike previous uniforms it no longer had shoulder straps thus having the insignias on the collar and instead of two breast pockets the jacket has pockets on the back. Older m/1939 uniforms were commonly resewn as m/1939-58.

==== m/1959 ====
Unlike the previous uniforms the m/1959 used green cotton fabric instead of wool for the role of a summer uniform while the overall cut remained similar to the m/1958 uniform. Still there were elements of the m/1959 uniform meant for winter use, specifically the wool lined winter cap and fur lined coat (vindrock)

==== m/1970 KV ====
The m/1970 KV uniform was the women's equivalent of the m/1959 uniform and was used until the adoption of the unisex M90

=== M90 ===
The M90 uniform consists of a field jacket (fältjacka), field trousers (fältbyxa), a field cap (fältmössa), and a helmet cover (hjälmdok). Other items issued as part of the field uniform include a green quarter-zip thermal shirt, a combat vest, balaclava, a white winter over-suit, and black leather combat boots.

These items are produced in the M90 pattern in three schemes, woodland, snow, and desert; although the snow camouflage is only issued to specific units. The desert camouflage has been in use with the Swedish ISAF contingent in Afghanistan since 2004.

==== Variants ====
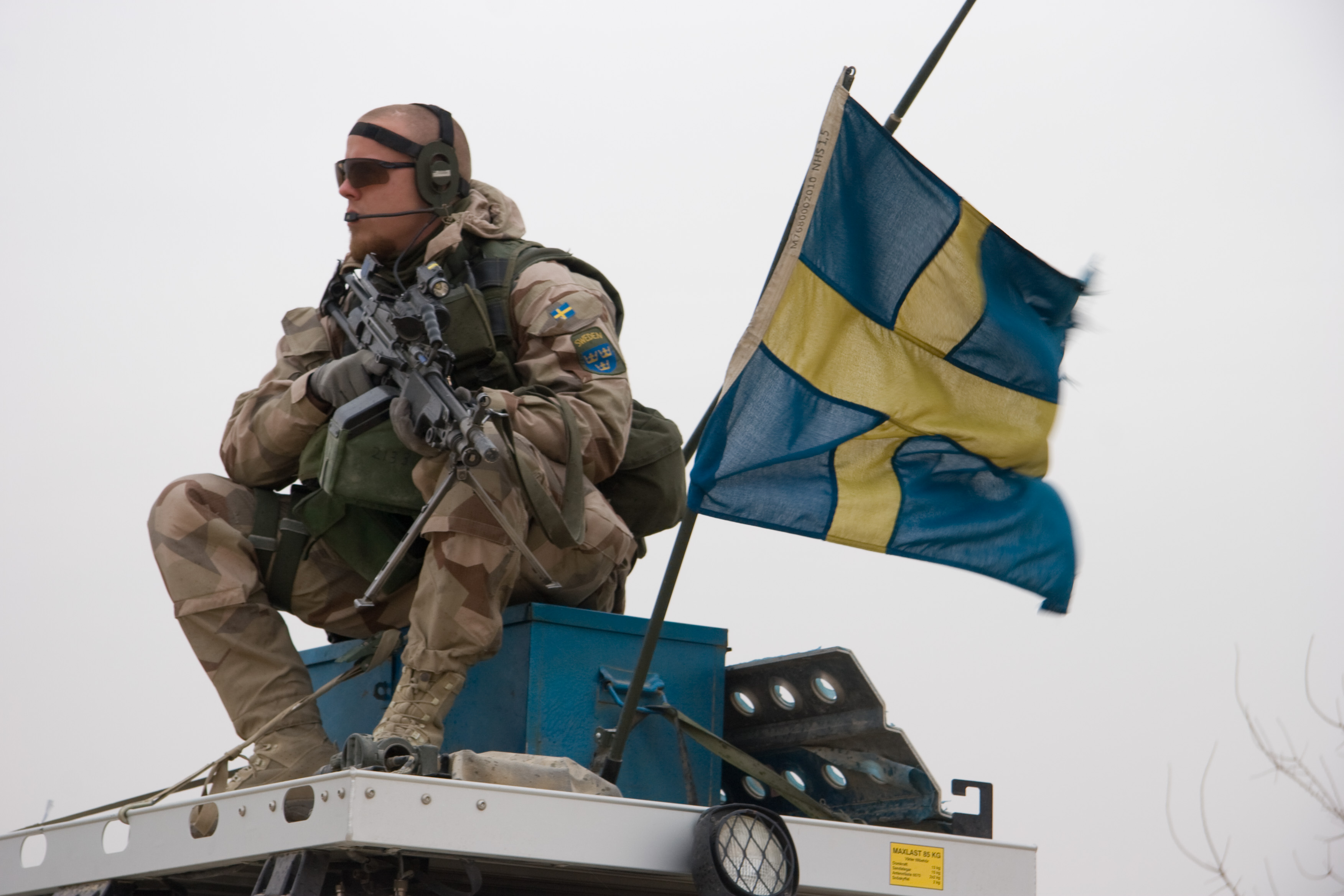
A Swedish soldier wearing M90 TR BE desert camouflage

The basic field uniform has a number of variations beyond the standard field and winter uniforms.

- 2002 ADYK - a special operations forces uniform
- M90H (Helikopter) - a specialised uniform designed for helicopter crews, made from a fire-resistant material. M90H jackets reverse to orange for use as an emergency signaling panel in the event of a crash over land or sea.
- M90L (Lätt/Light) - a uniform in the same pattern as the original M90, made in a thinner material for summer use.
- M90P (Pansar) - a special uniform for armoured units and regiments (Pansarregemente). This uniform has more pockets, has added padding to protect against the sharp corners in armoured vehicles, and is fireproof.
- M90 TR (Tropik) - a special uniform for tropical and subtropical environments. It is not allowed to be used inside the borders of Sweden.
- M90 TR BE (Tropik Beige) - a camouflage uniform designed for use in desert environments. It contains the standard M90 splinter pattern, recoloured for use in a desert environment. M90 TR BE has earth brown, light green and medium gray splinters on a sand-coloured background. It is not allowed to be used inside the borders of Sweden.
