= King's Own Enlisted Regiment =

Regiment of the Royal Swedish Army

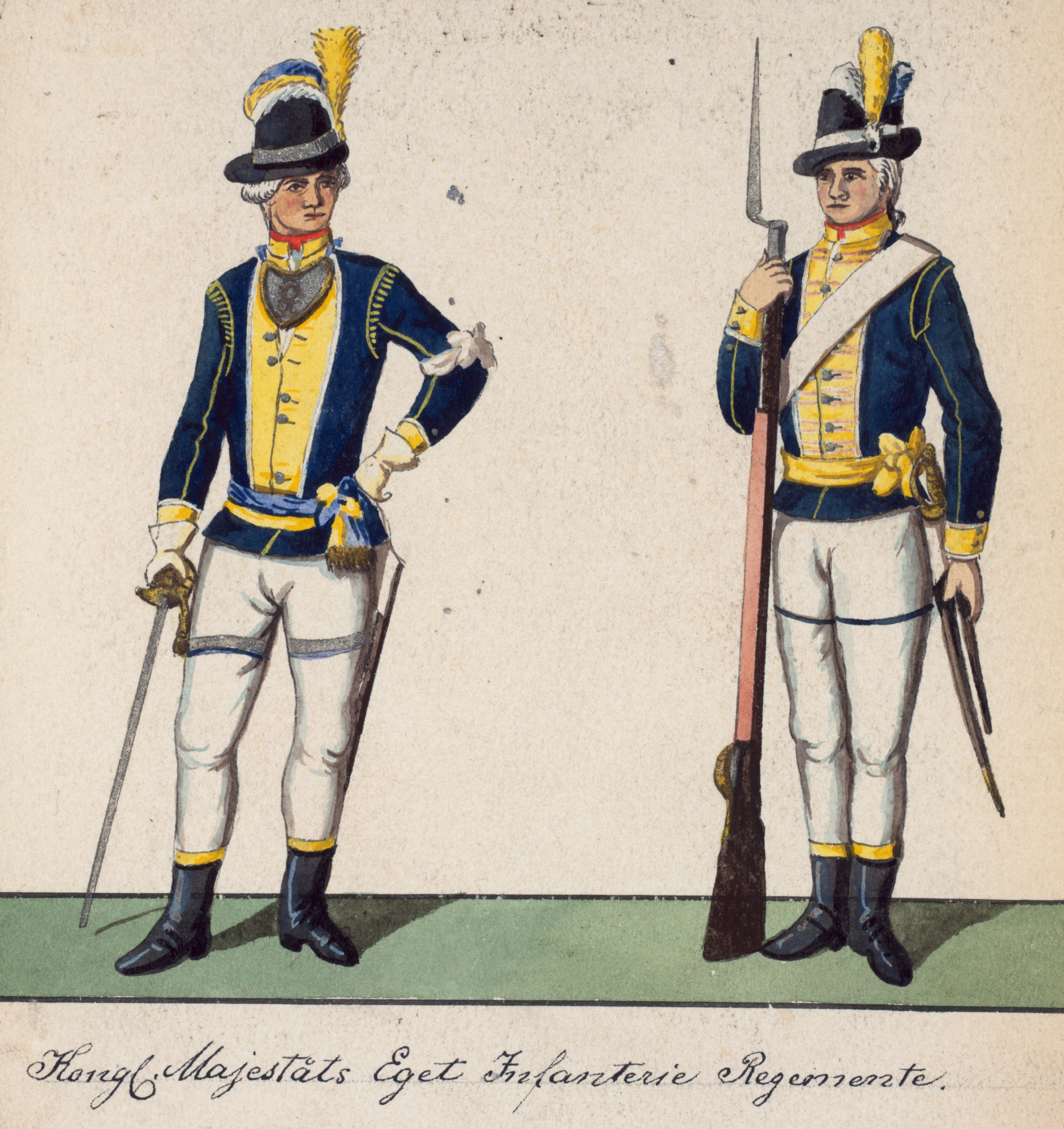
- Soldiers wearing the m/1779 uniform.
- Active: 1719–1829
- Allegiance: Kingdom of Sweden
- Branch: Royal Swedish Army
- Type: Enlisted infantry regiment
- Engagements: Russo-Swedish War

Insignia
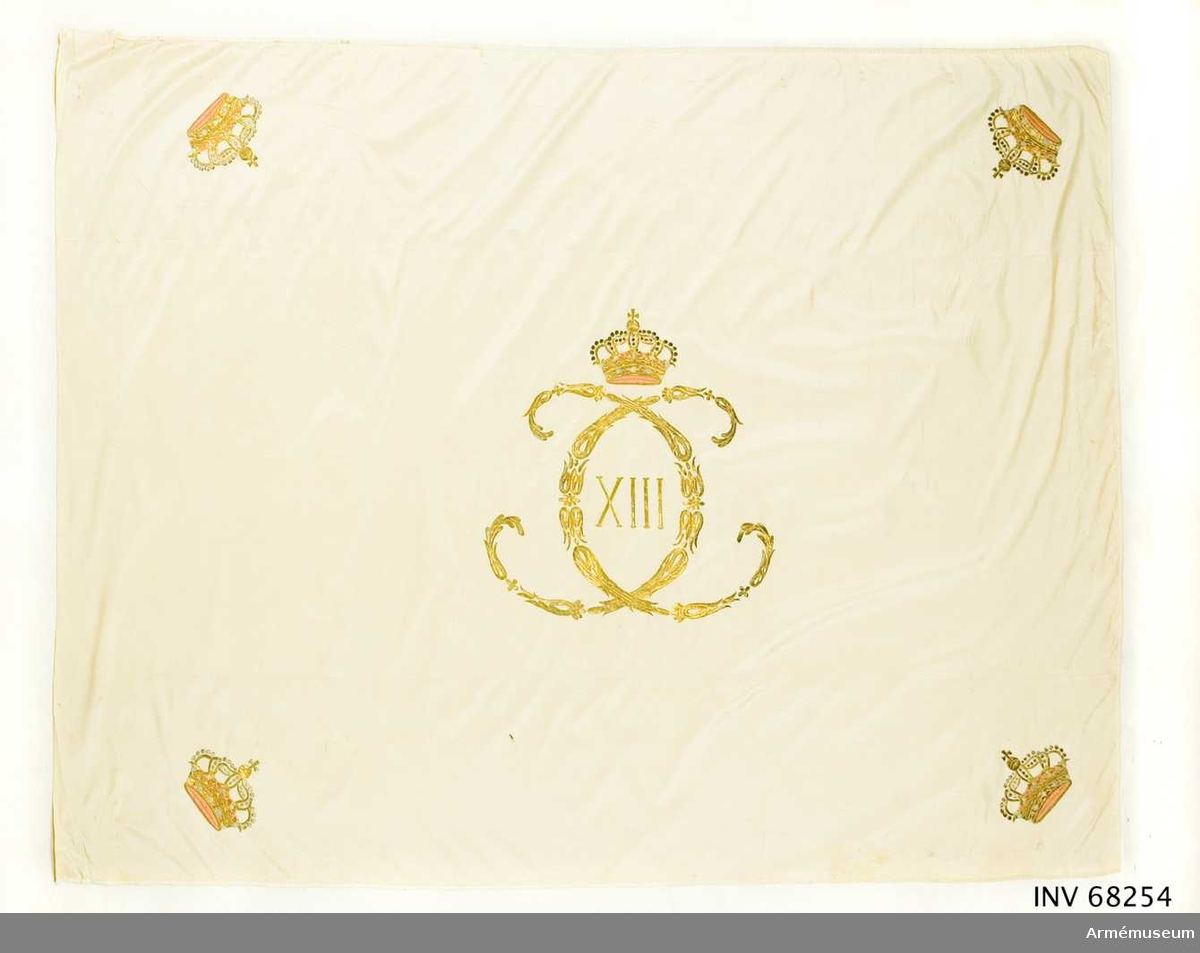
- Regimental banner (1809–1818)

The King's Own Enlisted Regiment was an enlisted infantry regiment of the Royal Swedish Army during 18th century.

== History ==
Following the death of Charles XII of Sweden, the regiment was founded in 1719 to serve in the Province of Halland as garrison. It was quickly reorganized to an enlisted regiment by only recruiting domestically. The regiment included soldiers of the Småland Third Man Regiment and the Småland Fifth Man Regiment. In 1721, soldiers of the Östergötland Third Man Regiment of Foot was transferred to the regiment.

Consisting of two battalions with 400 men each, the regiment was stationed in cities of Malmö och Landskrona. In 1755, parts of the regiment was stationed in the town of Loviisa and included eight companies. The regiment engaged in the Russo-Swedish War (1788–1790) and was particularly illustrious during the Battle of Svensksund (1790). In 1789, the Danckwardt's Enlisted Regiment was merged to the regiment.

On 18 May 1829 in Landskrona, the regiment was officially disbanded. It was replaced by two regiments of foot. The remaining personnel was transferred to the Landskrona Garrison Company, under the command of the North Scanian Infantry Regiment.

== Commanding officers ==
The following people have been commanding officers:

- 1719–1724: Thure Horn af Åminne
- 1724–1729: Philip Bogislaus von Schwerin
- 1729–1737: Bengt Horn af Rantzien
- 1737–1747: Jean Louis Bousquet
- 1747–1756: Georg von Heijne
- 1756–1764: Carl Adlerfelt
- 1764–1766: Ulrik Scheffer
- 1766–1773: Abraham von Björnmarck
- 1773–1792: Abraham Gustafschöld
- 1792–1795: Carl Philip von Blixen-Finecke
- 1795–1798: Niklas Peter von Björnmarck
- 1798–1811: Elof Rosenblad
- 1811–1812: Carl Axel Strömfelt
- 1812–1815: Gustaf Boije af Gennäs
- 1815–1829: Fredrik Ulrik Wrangel af Sauss

== Name changes ==
Swedish name	English translation	Year
T. Horns värvade regemente	T. Horn's Enlisted Regiment	1719–1724
von Schwerins värvade regemente	von Schwerin's Enlisted Regiment	1724–1729
B. Horns värvade regemente	B. Horn's Enlisted Regiment	1729–1737
Bousquets värvade regemente	Bousquet's Enlisted Regiment	1737–1747
Prins Gustavs regemente till fot	Prince Gustav's Regiment of Foot	1747–1753
Kronprinsens regemente till fot	Crown Prince's Regiment of Foot	1753–1771
Prins Fredrik Adolfs regemente till fot	Prince Frederick Adolph's Regiment of Foot	1771–1772
Konungens eget värvade regemente	King's Own Enlisted Regiment	1772–1829

== Gallery ==
Regimental banner

Regimental colour

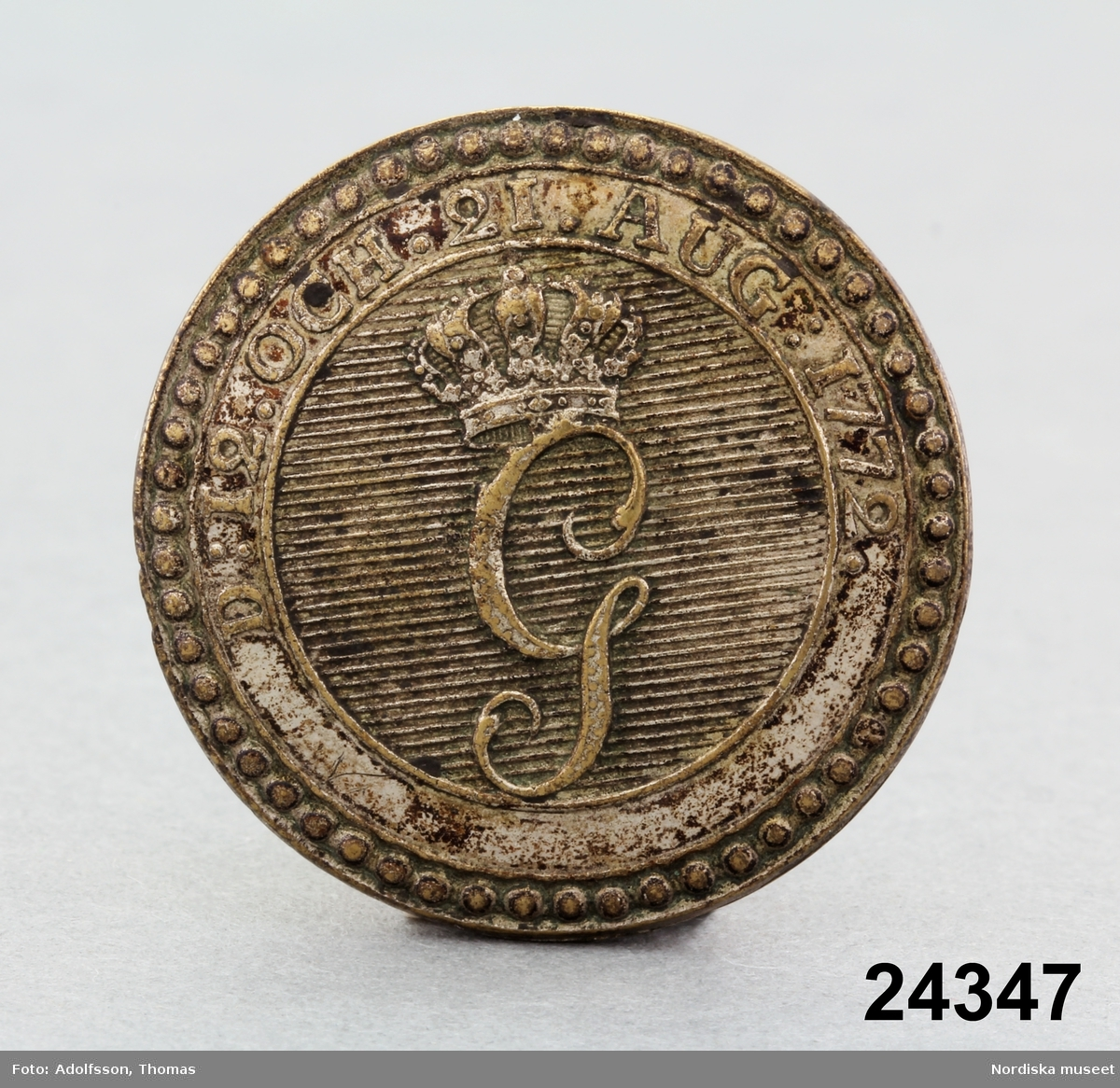
Uniform button

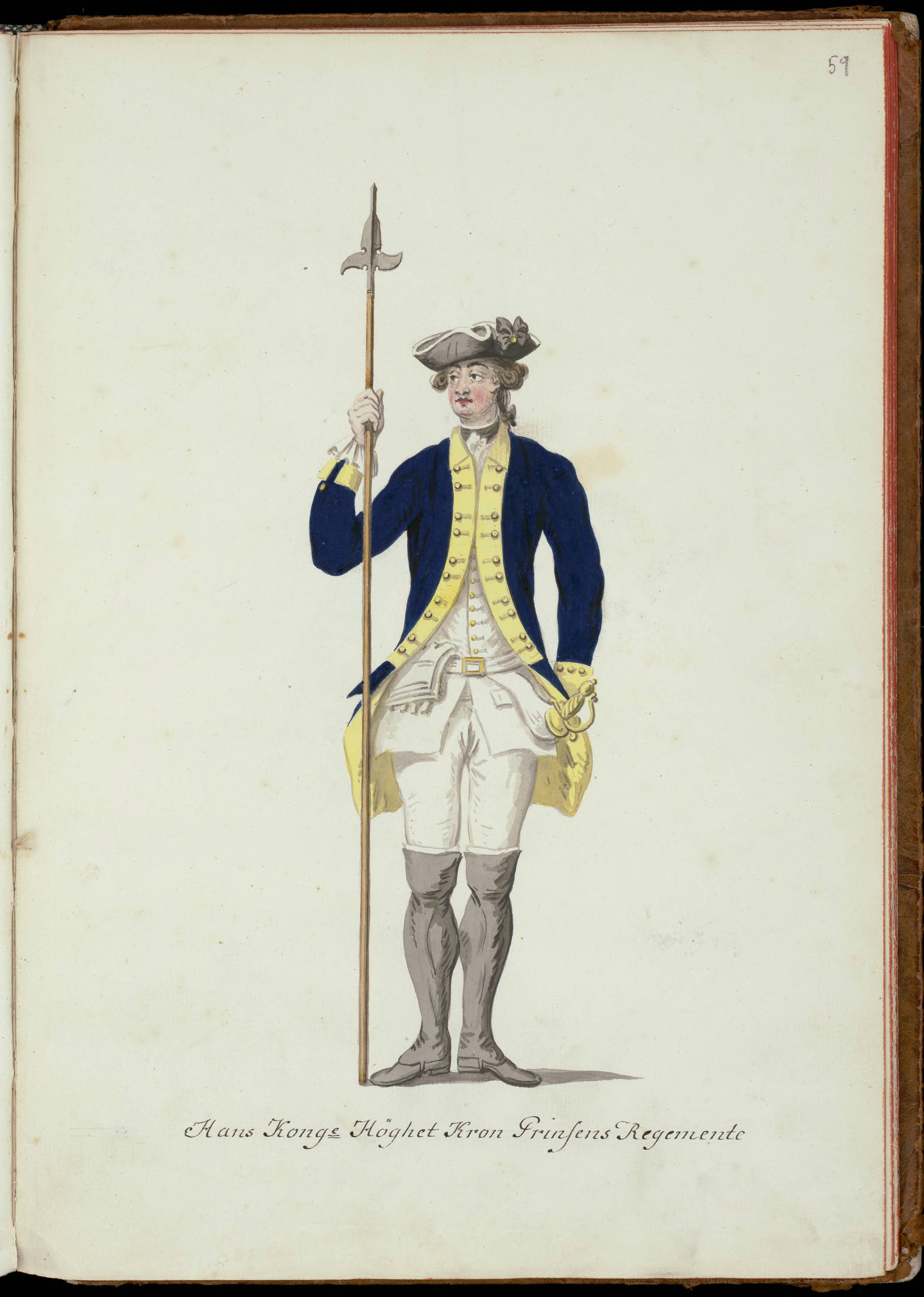
Soldier with halberd

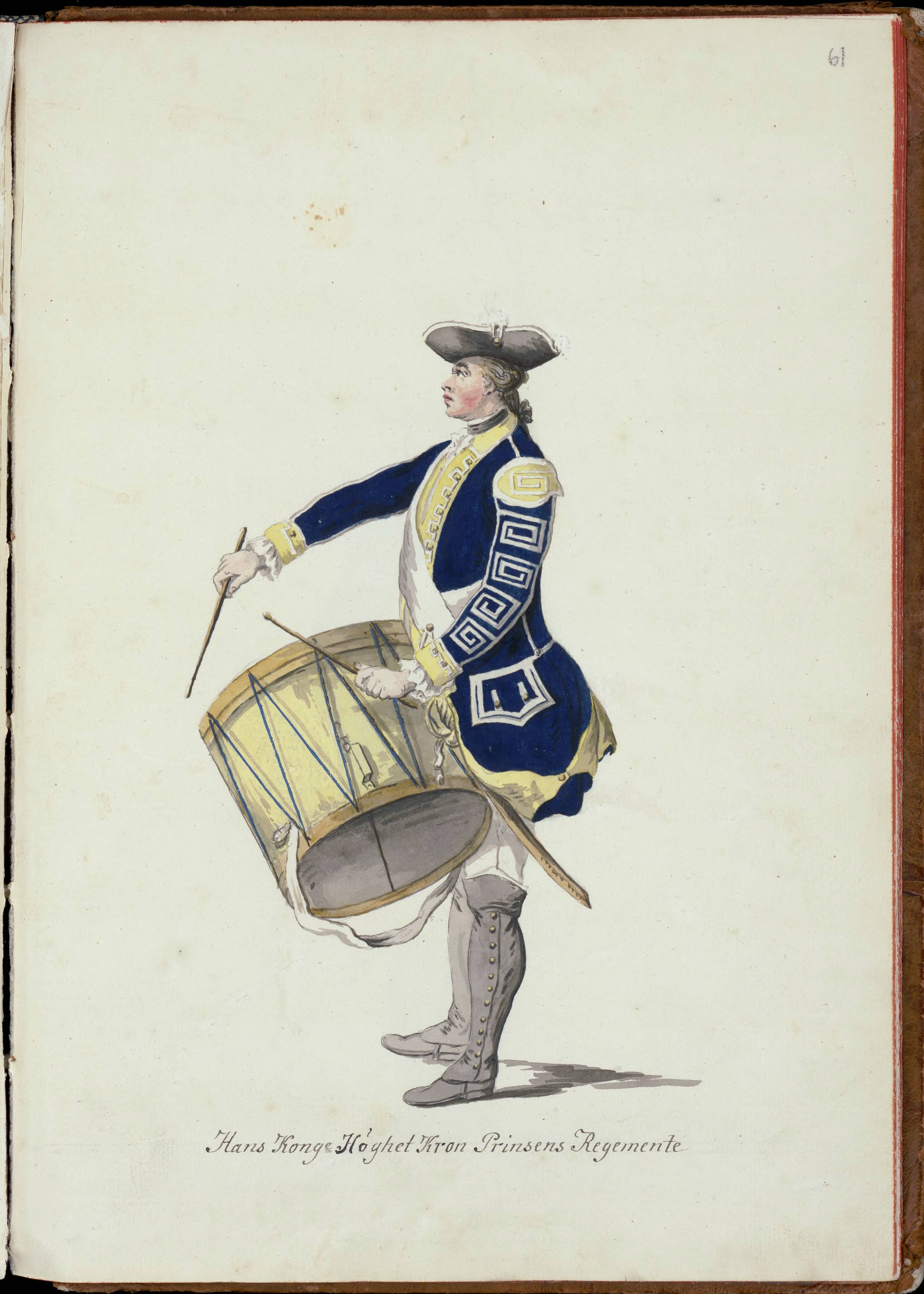
Drummer

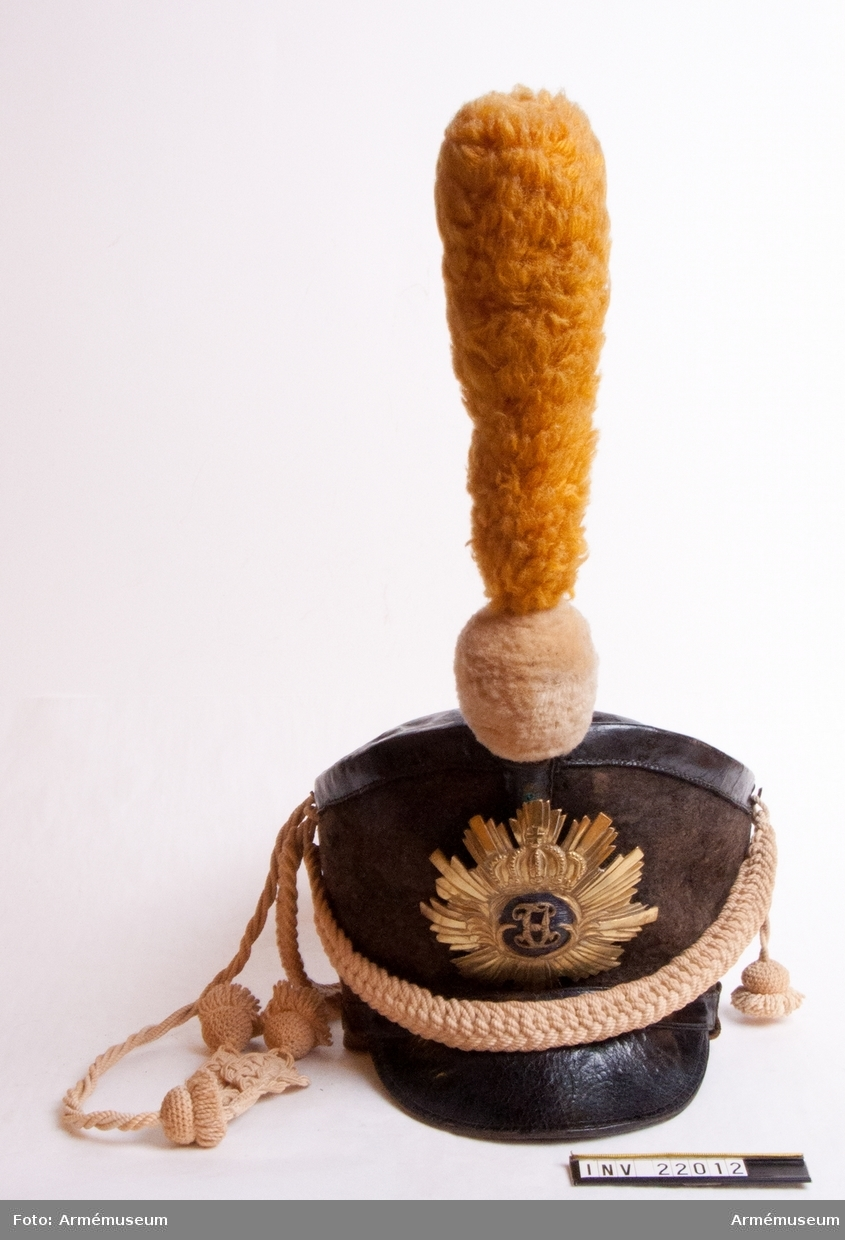
m/1815 shako helmet

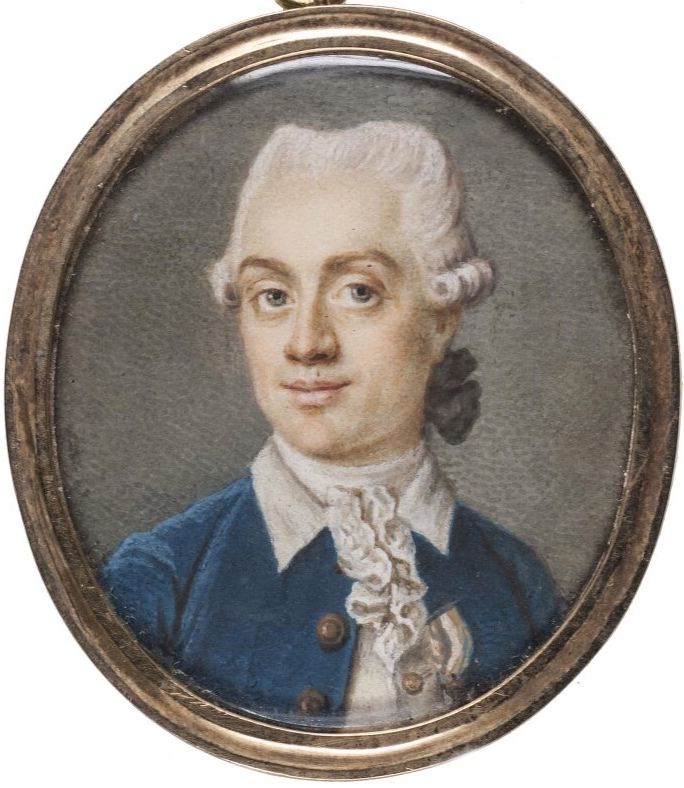
Miniature of Abraham Gustafschöld, one of the most prominent officers
