= Sten Sture the Younger =

Regent of Sweden (1493–1520)

- Regent; Riksföreståndare
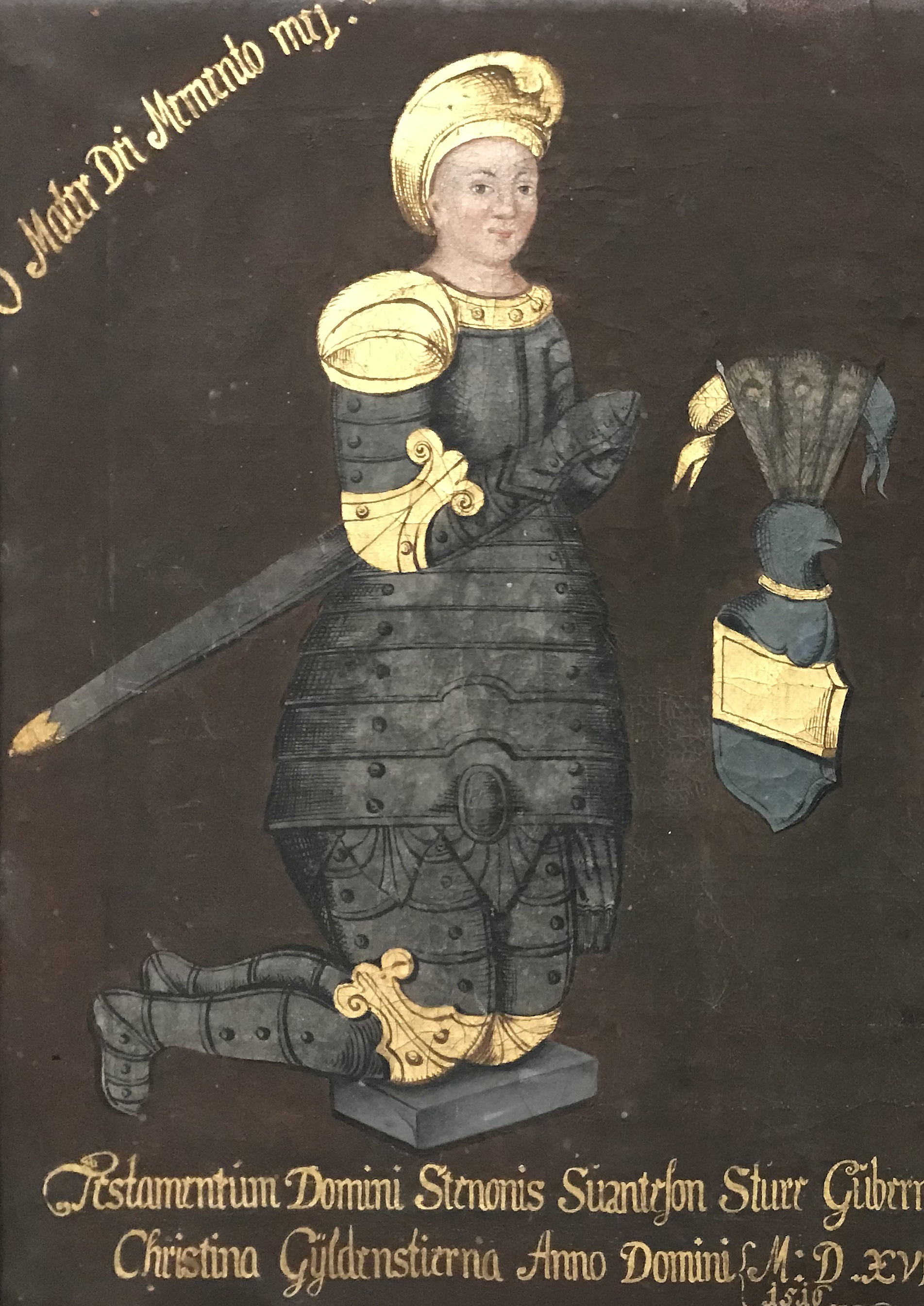
- Sten (Stenonis) Sture the Younger with comments in Renaissance Latin
- Reign: 23 July 1512 – 3 February 1520
- Predecessor: Erik Trolle
- Successor: Christian II
- Born: 1493
- Died: 3 February 1520 (aged 26–27); On the ice of lake Mälaren
- Burial: Corpse exhumed and burned at the Stockholm Bloodbath
- Spouse: Christina Gyllenstierna
- Issue: 6, including Svante Stensson Sture
- Father: Svante Nilsson
- Mother: Iliana Gisladotter Gädda

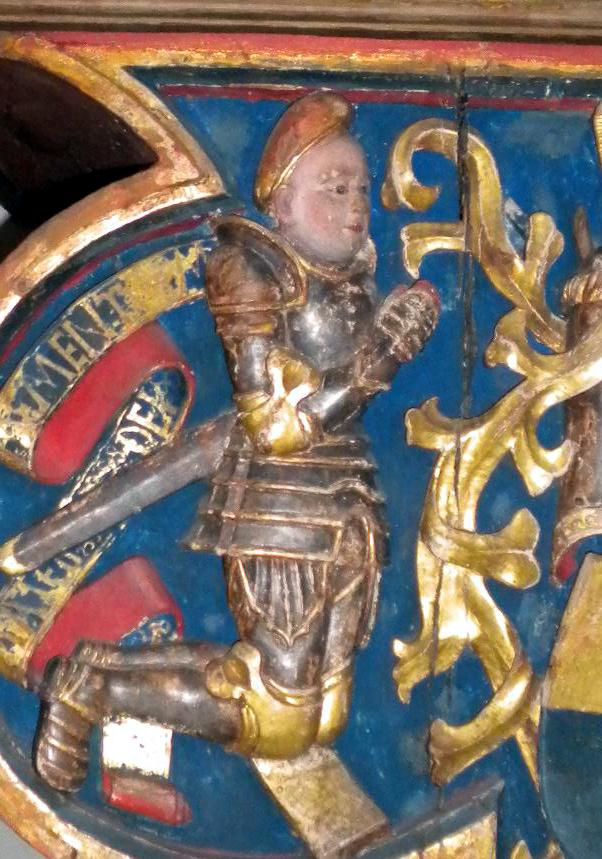
Portrayal on the altar of Västerås Cathedral

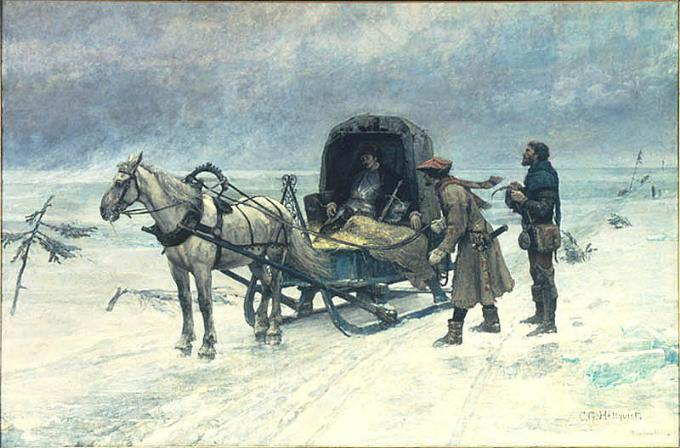
Death of Sten Sture the Younger on the ice of Lake Mälaren as imagined by Carl Gustaf Hellqvist in 1880

Sten Sture the Younger (Swedish: Sten Sture den yngre) (1493 – 3 February 1520), was a Swedish nobleman who served as the regent of Sweden during the era of the Kalmar Union. He successfully led Swedish forces in repelling several invasions by King Christian II of Denmark, but was mortally wounded by a cannonball at the Battle of Bogesund in January 1520 and died.

== Biography ==
Sture was born in 1493, as the son of Svante Nilsson (regent of Sweden) and Iliana Gisladotter Gädda, heiress of Ulvåsa.

In 1512, Sten Sture succeeded his father as elected regent of Sweden upon his death. During this period, Denmark, Norway and Sweden were formally part of the Kalmar Union through a personal union under the King of Denmark, but in reality, Sweden had been a de facto independent kingdom under "regents" (riksföreståndare) native high nobles elected to rule the country.

High Councillor Eric Trolle was chosen as regent by the High Council; he supported the union with Denmark. However, Sten Sture utilized the castles and troops fiefed to him by his late father and executed a coup. After Sture promised to continue union negotiations with Denmark, the High Council accepted him as regent, replacing Eric Trolle.

In reality, Sture's purpose was to keep Sweden independent. He adopted the Sture surname, a heritage from his great-grandmother, because it symbolized the independence of Sweden and served as a reminder of Sten Sture the Elder, his father's third cousin.

Conflict soon arose between Sture as regent and Gustav Trolle, Archbishop of Uppsala and son of Eric Trolle. The archbishop claimed more autonomy for the church. Sture had Trolle removed from his office and imprisoned.

Sture knew that sooner or later, a war with King John of Denmark (died 1513) or his son and successor King Christian II of Denmark would be inevitable. Therefore, in 1513 he agreed to a truce with Russia.

When Christian II started an invasion of Sweden, Sture was mortally wounded at the Battle of Bogesund on 19 January 1520 and died on the ice of lake Mälaren on his way back to Stockholm. This was during the later part of Christian II of Denmark's war against Sweden.

Christian II was enthroned in Sweden in November 1520 and archbishop Gustav had his revenge against supporters of Sture and against those who deposed the archbishop: he listed those enemies and accusations against them, denouncing them as heretics. King Christian had those accused executed at the Stockholm Bloodbath (Stockholms blodbad) in November 1520, including Sten Sture's corpse, which was desecrated as that of a heretic by being burnt at the stake.

== Personal life ==
Sten Sture's marriage to Christina Gyllenstierna, a great-granddaughter of King Charles VIII, produced six children, but only one of them survived to mature adulthood, the son Svante Stensson Sture, who was later elevated to Riksmarsk and Count of Stegeholm. In the 20th century, his distant direct descendant Princess Sibylla of Saxe-Coburg and Gotha married the hereditary Prince Gustaf Adolf. Their son was King Carl XVI Gustav.

== Other sources ==
- Bain, Robert (1911). "Sture" . In Chisholm, Hugh (ed.). Encyclopædia Britannica. Vol. 25 (11th ed.). Cambridge University Press. pp. 1051–1052.
- Gilman, D. C.; Peck, H. T.; Colby, F. M., eds. (1905). "Sture" . New International Encyclopedia (1st ed.). New York: Dodd, Mead.
- Greta Wieselgren (1949) Sten Sture d.y. och Gustav Trolle (Stockholm: Gleerup,)

Sten Sture the Younger Born: 1493 Died: 5 February 1520
Regnal titles
Preceded by Eric Trolle	Regent of Sweden; 1512–1520	Succeeded by Christian II as King of Sweden
