= Gustav Trolle =

Archbishop of Uppsala from 1515 to 1521

The Most Reverend Gustav Trolle
- Archbishop of Uppsala; Primate of Sweden
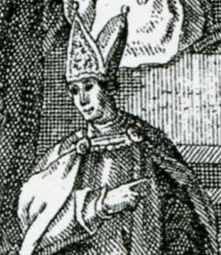
- Church: Roman Catholic
- Archdiocese: Uppsala
- Appointed: 25 May 1515
- In office: 1515–1521
- Predecessor: Jakob Ulvsson
- Successor: Johannes Magnus

Personal details
- Born: September 1488 Småland, Sweden
- Died: 1535 (aged 46–47) Fyn, Denmark
- Buried: Schleswig Cathedral
- Parents: Eric Trolle; Ingeborg Filipsdotter

Gustav Eriksson Trolle (September 1488 – 1535) was the archbishop of Uppsala in Sweden, in two sessions, during the turbulent Reformation events.

He was the son of Eric Arvidsson Trolle, a former regent of Sweden during the era of the Kalmar Union. After returning from studies abroad, in Cologne and Rome, he was in 1513 elected vicar in Linköping. One year later he became Archbishop of Uppsala. In 1515, he got into an argument with the Swedish regent Sten Sture the Younger, who spread the rumour that he was allied with the King Christian II of Denmark. True or not, it resulted in Trolle being removed from his office and put under siege in the archbishop's mansion Almarestäket at lake Mälaren. In the winter of 1517, Almarestäket was demolished by orders from the Swedish government.

The Danish threat grew stronger, and Trolle was among those who spoke in favour of the Danish King. In 1520, Christian II of Denmark entered Sweden, and Trolle was rewarded by being reappointed Archbishop of Uppsala. He crowned Christian King of Sweden on 4 November, 1520. This, and subsequent events, supports the notion of the two having made a deal previous to Christian's conquest of Sweden.

== Stockholm Bloodbath ==
Gustav Trolle presented a list of antagonists who had caused him to suffer and who had ordered the demolition of Almarestäket. King Christian gathered several people (some sources say 100, other say 20), and had them executed at the so-called Bloodbath of Stockholm on 10 November, 1520. The details and death toll are uncertain, for Christian himself wanted the public execution to have as strong effect as possible, and later, King Gustav I of Sweden is likely to have boosted the figures to support his Danish War.

Christian returned home a few months later and Trolle was one of those put in charge of the government. But Trolle was unpopular, and in September the following year he was forced to leave Sweden, and move to Denmark where he lived for several years. In 1526 he then met with Christian in the Netherlands. Christian had been dethroned from Denmark, but was eager to get back in power. He renounced his Lutheran faith so that he could gain the support of the Catholic Church, and his brother-in-law Holy Roman Emperor Charles V. He gathered an army and sailed to conquer Norway in AD 1530, aiming to re-establish the Union of Kalmar.

After a few years of feuds, Trolle was mortally wounded in a battle at Øksnebjerg, in Fyn, Denmark, 1535. He was buried at the Schleswig Cathedral.

He was described by Olaus Petri as a stiff and obstinate man. For a long time after his death, he was regarded as a traitor to the Swedish people. This was also the prevailing view among the Swedish 19th-century historians such as Anders Fryxell.

== See also ==
- List of archbishops of Uppsala
