= Skabersjö Castle =

Castle in Scania, Sweden

- Skabersjö slott
- Svedala Municipality
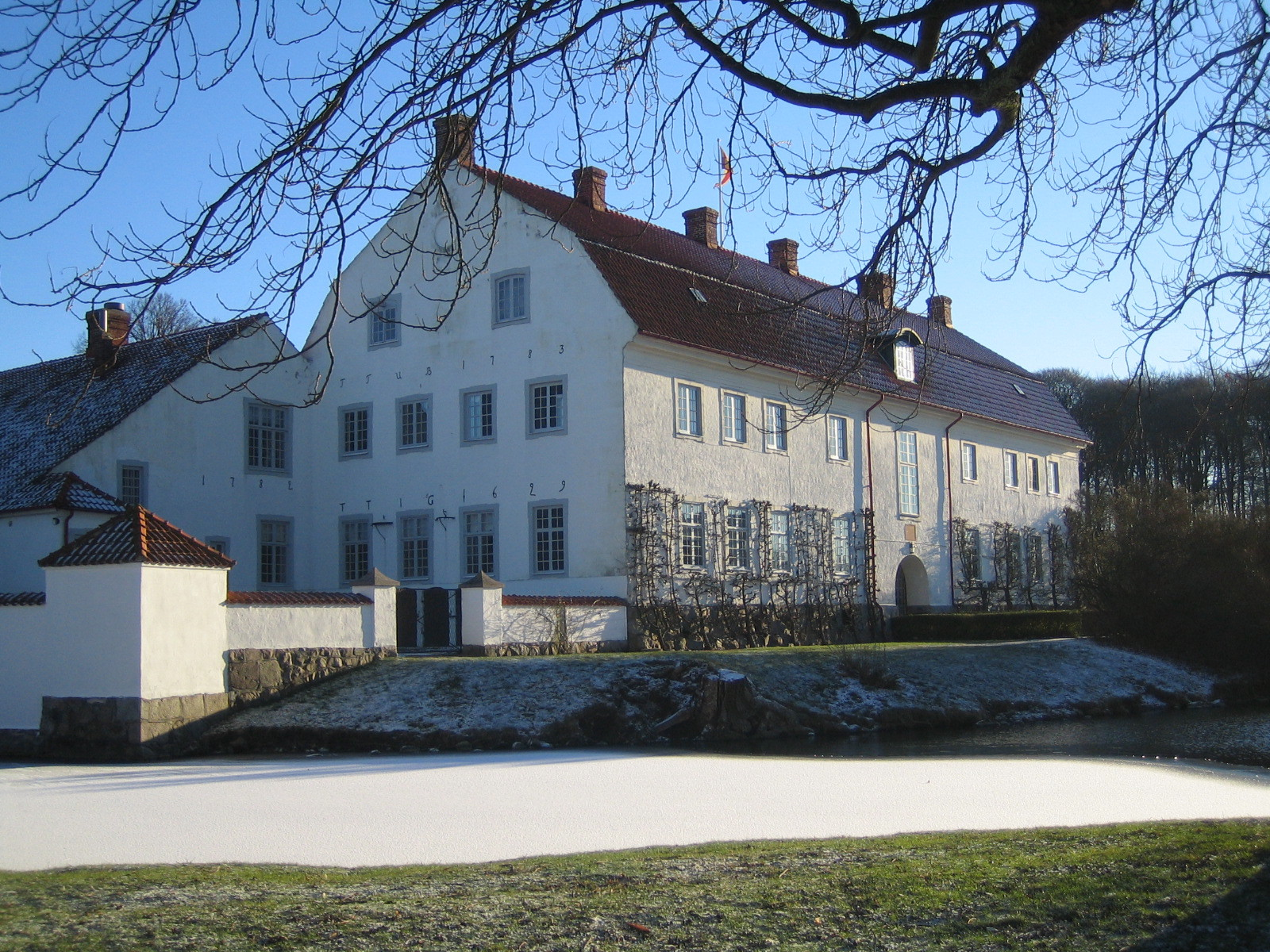
- Skabersjö Castle

Site information
- Type: Castle
- Open to the public: By appointment

Location
- Scania, Sweden
- Location within Skåne
- Coordinates: 55.540556°N 13.146667°E

Site history
- Built: 1510s

Skabersjö Castle (Swedish: Skabersjö slott) is a castle in Svedala Municipality, Scania, in southern Sweden. The castle is located just 12 kilometres (7.5 mi) southeast of central Malmö.

== See also ==
- List of castles in Sweden
