= Trolleholm Castle =

Building in Scania, Sweden

- Trolleholms slott
- Svalöv Municipality
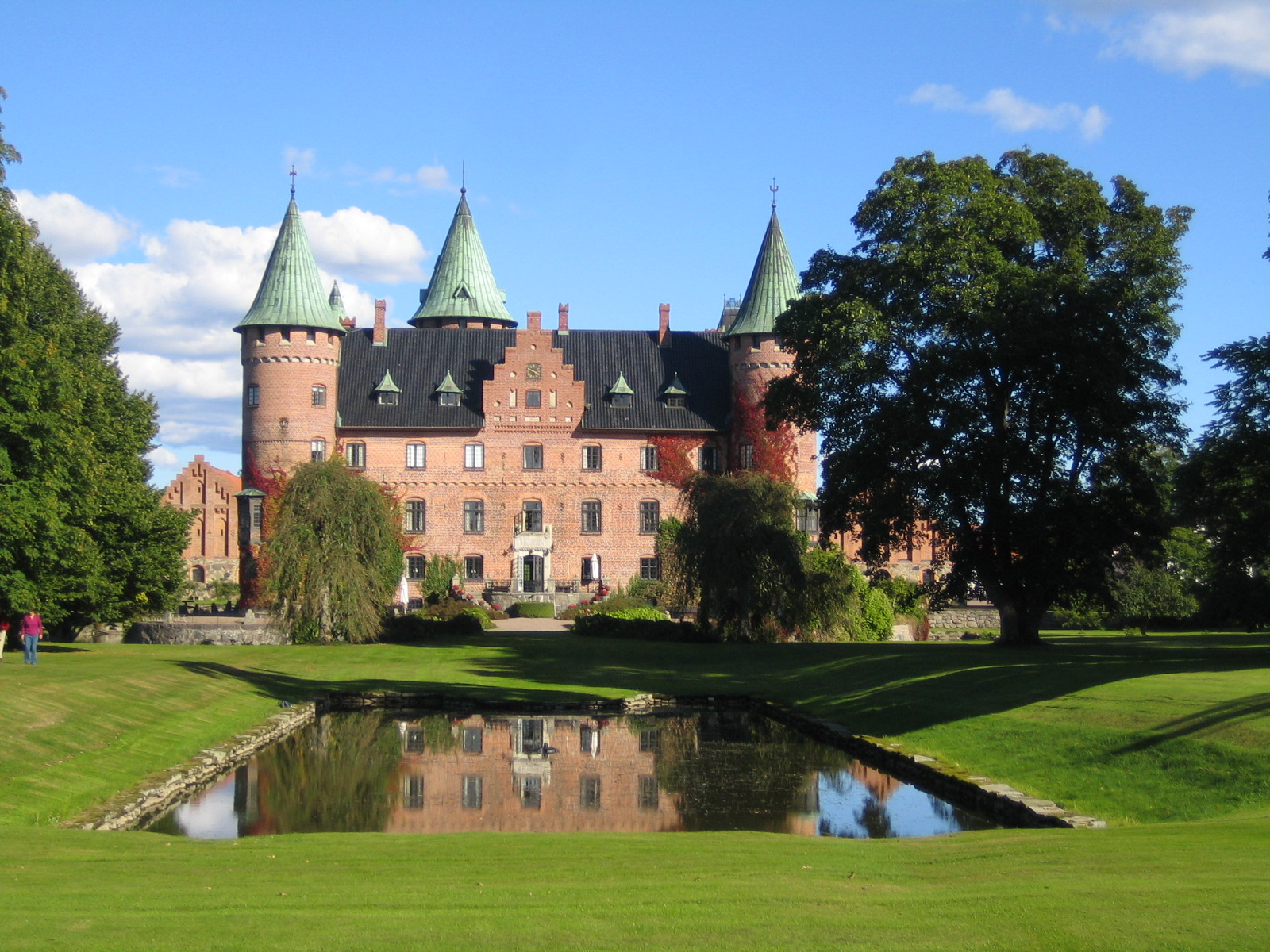
- Trolleholm Castle

Site information
- Type: Castle
- Open to the public: No

Location
- Scania, Sweden
- Location within Skåne
- Coordinates: 55.908333°N 13.261944°E

Site history
- Built: 1530s

Trolleholm Castle (Swedish: Trolleholms slott) is a castle in Svalöv Municipality, Scania, in southern Sweden.

== In popular culture ==
Trolleholm Castle was chosen by Arrow Games to feature in their Scandinavian Series of jigsaws in the 1960-80s. It's definitely the same castle in their jigsaw as shown in all photos of Trolleholm, yet somehow they managed to rename it 'Trolleheim Castle' and place it in Norway. Given that all searches of Google and Google Maps for 'Trolleheim Castle, Norway' only bring references to the puzzle, this seems to be the only place it could have come from. The Trolleholm Castle used in an online jigsaw puzzle correctly identifies the castle as Swedish and shows the castle in a version which may be put together at the website.

== See also ==
- List of castles in Sweden
