= Reichsverweser =

Representation of the monarch during a throne vacancy

A Reichsverweser (German pronunciation: [ˈʁaɪ̯çsfɛɐ̯veːzɐ]) or imperial regent represented a monarch when there was a vacancy in the throne, such as during a prolonged absence or in the period between the monarch's death and the accession of a successor. The term Verweser comes from the Old High German firwesan and means "for or in the place of a person". The plural form is the same as the singular.

In the Holy Roman Empire, Reichsverweser were used periodically, but after its dissolution in 1806, the position was occupied only for one relatively short period during the German revolutions of 1848–1849. Although there were discussions about naming a Reichsverweser at the end of World War I and during the Nazi era, none was ever appointed.

In Sweden, the equivalent title riksföreståndare is still in use for a temprorary stand-in for the monarch.

Comparable offices have also existed in Hungary (kormányzó) and Finland (valtionhoitaja).

== Holy Roman Empire ==
Banner of the Holy Roman Emperor, used 1400–1806.

In the Holy Roman Empire's German and Italian territories, regents were called imperial vicars (Reichsvikare). For Germany, the Golden Bull of 1356 formally codified an earlier rule on imperial administration: the Count Palatine of the Rhine was imperial vicar for the territories under the Frankish civil law code (Salic Law), while the Elector of Saxony was vicar for the territories under Saxon law. Their powers included continuing the king's ongoing business, jurisdiction over the courts and granting certain imperial fiefs.

The imperial vicariate over Italy, which the popes at times claimed as their right, was disputed between the dukes of Savoy and Mantua. During the frequent absences of Emperor Frederick II in the 13th century, he appointed imperial governors (Reichsgubernatoren) as deputies and guardians for his sons Henry (VII) and Conrad IV.

== Germany ==
=== German revolutions of 1848–1849 ===
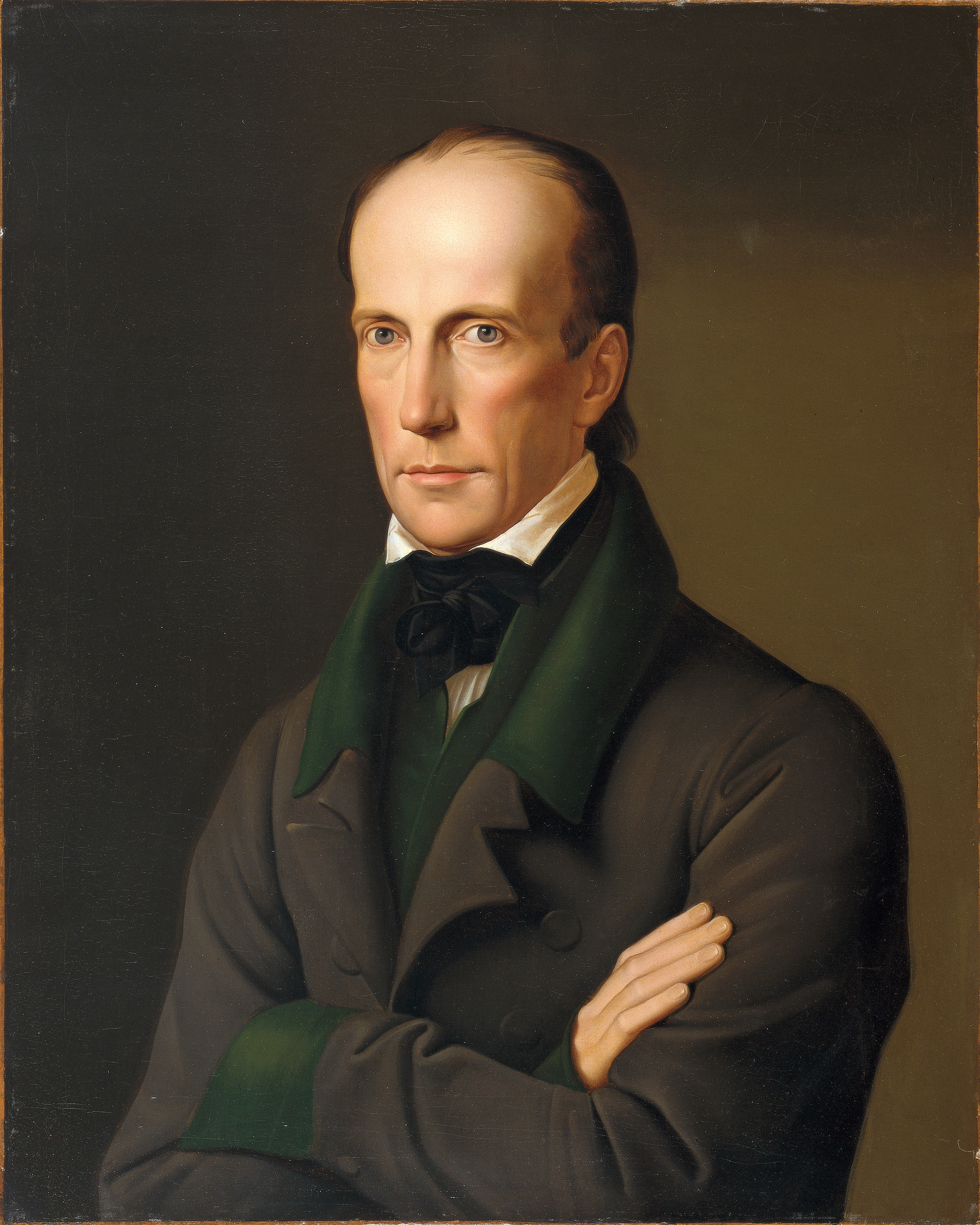
Archduke John of Austria.

On 28 June 1848, four months after the outbreak of the German revolutions of 1848–1849, the Frankfurt National Assembly created a Provisional Central Authority (Provisorische Zentralgewalt) that was to take over the management of the executive branch for all of Germany until a constitution was adopted and a final head of state appointed. On the following day, Archduke John of Austria was elected Reichsverweser, an office that he was intended to hold until the National Assembly appointed an emperor as head of state. The power of John's government was limited, since the larger individual states in particular cooperated with it only when it suited their interests. Executive power remained with the individual states. After the revolution was suppressed in the summer of 1849, the Provisional Central Authority remained in office. It was not until 20 December 1849 that John transferred his powers to an Austro-Prussian Federal Commission (Bundeszentralkommission).

=== Abdication of Emperor Wilhelm II ===
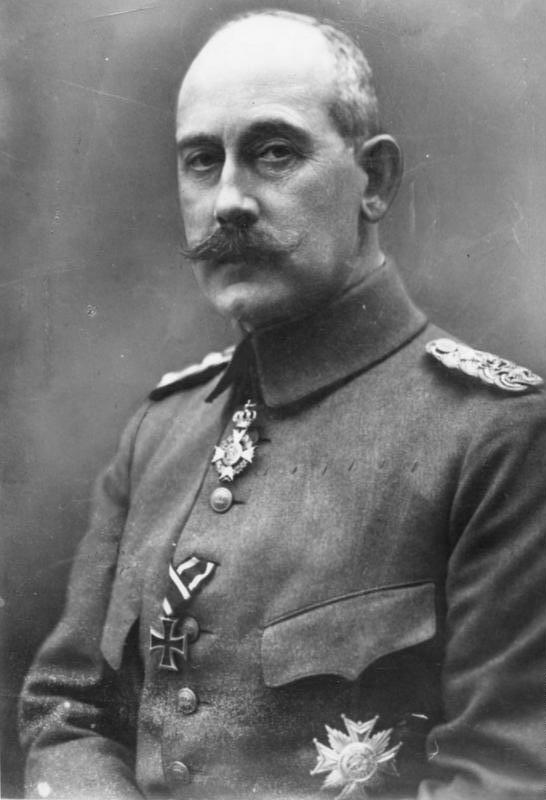
Prince Max von Baden.

In the final weeks of World War I, calls increased for the abdication of Prussian King and German Emperor Wilhelm II. Walter Simons, an advisor to Chancellor Max von Baden on international issues, thought that Wilhelm and the unpopular crown prince should abdicate so that a regency council could be established for the next heir to the throne, the then 12-year-old Wilhelm of Prussia. A law amending the constitution of the German Empire would have been needed to establish a Reichsverweser. Wilhelm II rejected the idea on 1 November 1918.

When the Social Democratic Party demanded the emperor's abdication, von Baden urged him plainly to step down. On 9 November 1918 he announced the abdication of Wilhelm II and the crown prince on his own authority. He thought that the abdication was imminent and that officials were simply working out the formulation of the announcement. He also feared that a revolution was imminent.

In a meeting with leading Social Democrats, von Baden transferred the office of chancellor to Friedrich Ebert. Baden's advisors had urged him to exercise the powers of the emperor as Reichsverweser in order to keep the question of the head of state open until a decision was made by a national assembly. But that same afternoon, the Social Democrat Philipp Scheidemann, acting on his own, publicly proclaimed a republic in Germany. Immediately afterwards the surprised and angry Ebert asked von Baden to become Reichsverweser, but he refused because he no longer believed such a course to be realistic.

Beginning on 12 November, the function of emperor and Reich chancellor (and, to some extent, of other state offices) was exercised by the Council of the People's Deputies, of which Ebert was one of the two chairmen. The Act on Provisional Reich Power (Gesetz über die vorläufige Reichsgewalt) of 10 February 1919 gave Germany a provisional constitutional order and, soon thereafter, a president and government. No Reichsverweser was ever named.

=== Nazi era ===
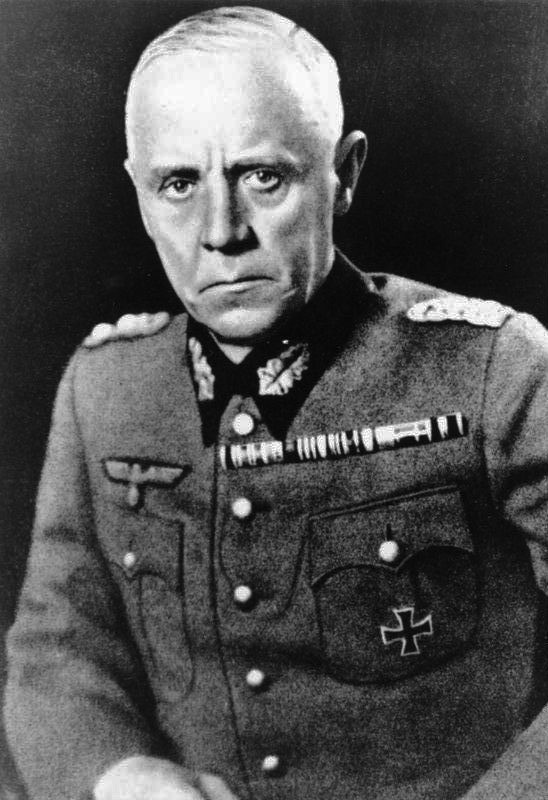
General Ludwig Beck.

In the 20 July 1944 plot to assassinate Adolf Hitler, it was envisioned that General Ludwig Beck would become provisional head of state as Reichsverweser after Hitler was killed. When the plot failed, Beck and many other members of the resistance were executed.

The anti-Nazi Kreisau Circle outlined its ideas for a German constitution after the end of Nazi rule in the "Principles for Reorganization" of 9 August 1943. The office of Reichsverweser that it contained was for the most part comparable to that of the Weimar Reich president. He would have appointed and dismissed members of the government, who under certain conditions could also have been removed by the Reichstag. The Reichsverweser would not have been elected by the people as under the Weimar constitution but by the Reichstag. The right of nomination was vested in a Reichsrat, a body that would include the heads of the states. The document set the Reichsweser's term of office at 12 years.

The Kreisau Circle's plans were never used. Most of its members were arrested following the failed July 20 plot to assassinate Hitler.

== Finland ==
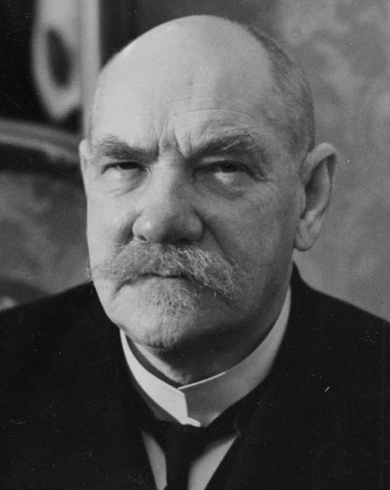
Pehr Evind Svinhufvud.

Finland belonged to the Russian Empire as a Grand Duchy from 1809 to 1917. After the abdication of Tsar Nicholas II in March 1917, the Finnish parliament in December 1917 declared the country independent without having decided on the final form of government. The chief minister Pehr Evind Svinhufvud acted as provisional head of state. After the German-Russian Treaty of Brest-Litovsk that ended Russia's participation in World War I, Finland briefly came under the influence of the German Empire in 1918. It led to the proclamation of the Kingdom of Finland in May 1918, for which Svinhufvud assumed the function of regent (Finnish: valtionhoitaja; Swedish: riksföreståndare) until a monarch yet to be chosen took office. In October 1918 the Finnish parliament elected the German prince Frederick Charles of Hesse as king. He initially accepted but never took office due to Germany's defeat in World War I and the subsequent German Revolution of 1918–1919. In December 1918 he formally renounced the crown.

At the same time, the former regent Svinhufvud resigned and was replaced by the commander-in-chief of the Finnish army, General Carl Gustaf Emil Mannerheim. While Svinhufvud had primarily needed to cooperate with the Germans to secure Finland's independence, Mannerheim was concerned with the international recognition of Finland by the victorious powers of the Entente as a sovereign state. Since the outcome of the war had made the retention of a monarchical form of government obsolete, Finland was proclaimed a republic in July 1919, and Mannerheim as regent was replaced by Kaarlo Juho Ståhlberg as president.

== Sweden ==
In Sweden, the title riksföreståndare ('regent' or 'steward of the realm') was first used in 1438, when Karl Knutsson Bonde assumed the office. During the Kalmar Union (1397–1523), a riksföreståndare could serve as the monarch's representative or govern Sweden in opposition to the union monarch. The office became effectively permanent during the Sture era (1470–1520), apart from the reign of King John in Sweden. This practice ended in 1523, when Gustav Vasa, then riksföreståndare, was elected king.

The title was subsequently held by Duke Charles from 1599 to 1604, during the conflict with King Sigismund, and by Duke Charles in 1809, following the deposition of Gustav IV Adolf.

Under the Instrument of Government of 1974, the title remains in use. If the monarch is unable to perform the duties of head of state, an eligible member of the royal house assumes those duties as tillfällig riksföreståndare ('regent ad interim') in accordance with the order of succession. The Riksdag elects a regent if the royal house becomes extinct or if the monarch dies or abdicates while the heir to the throne is under the age of 18. If no eligible person is available, the Riksdag may elect a temporary regent to serve under a government order; otherwise, the Speaker of the Riksdag or a deputy speaker performs the duties under such an order.
