= Trollenäs Castle =

Castle in Eslöv Municipality, Scania, Sweden

- Trollenäs slott
- Eslöv Municipality
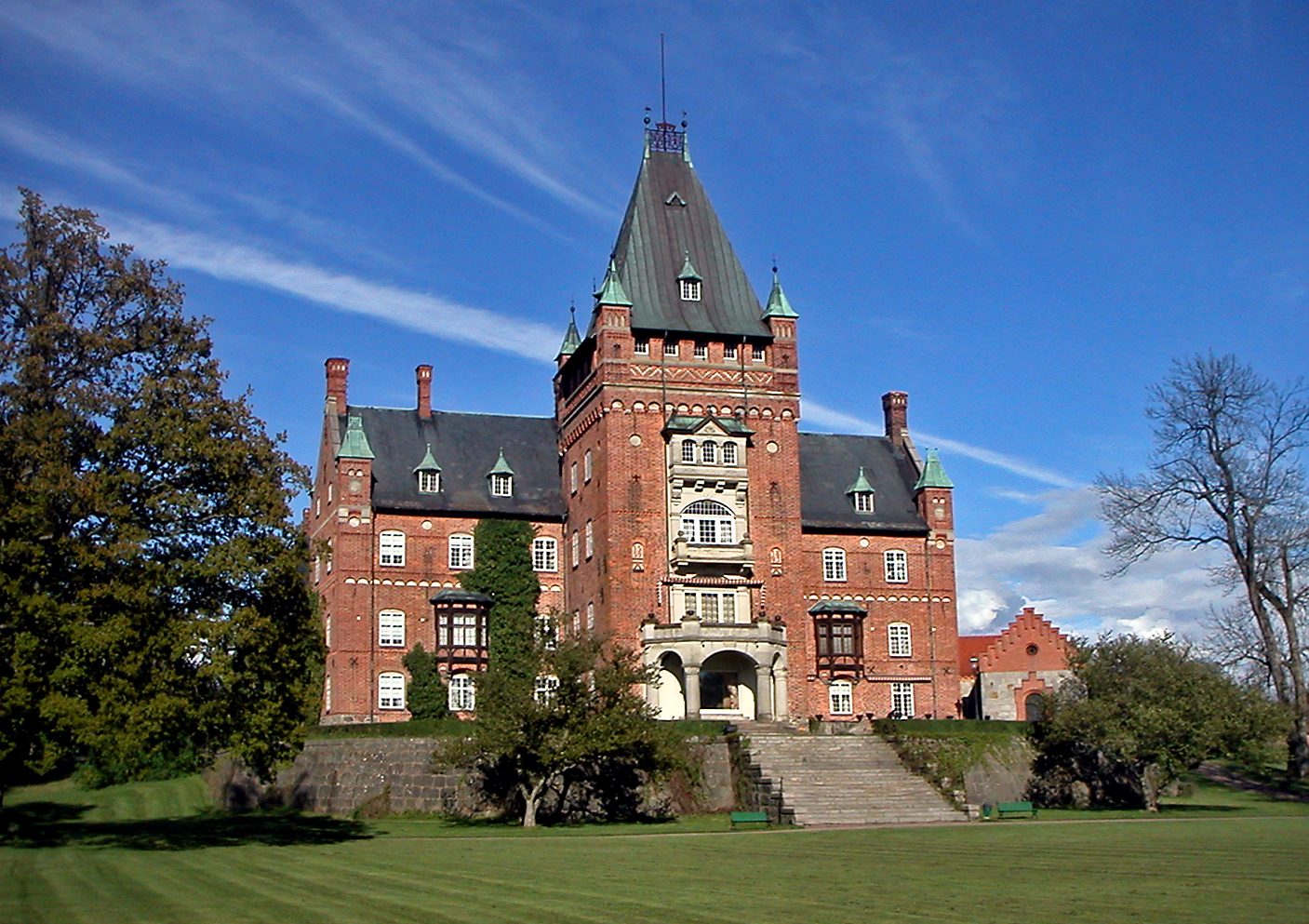
- Trollenäs Castle

Site information
- Type: Castle
- Open to the public: Yes

Location
- Scania, Sweden
- Coordinates: 55.8659°N 13.2444°E

Site history
- Built: 1559; 467 years ago

Trollenäs Castle (Swedish: Trollenäs slott) is a castle in Eslöv Municipality, Scania, in southern Sweden. It dates from the 14th century, and has been in the ownership of only two families, Thott and Trolle. The current building goes back to 1559 and was in the late 19th century renovated by architect Ferdinand Meldahl to resemble a French Renaissance castle.

The castle is open to the public, offering facilities for weddings, conferences, dinners and other festivities. In the park there is a café.
