= Axel Sparre =

Swedish soldier and artist (1652–1728)

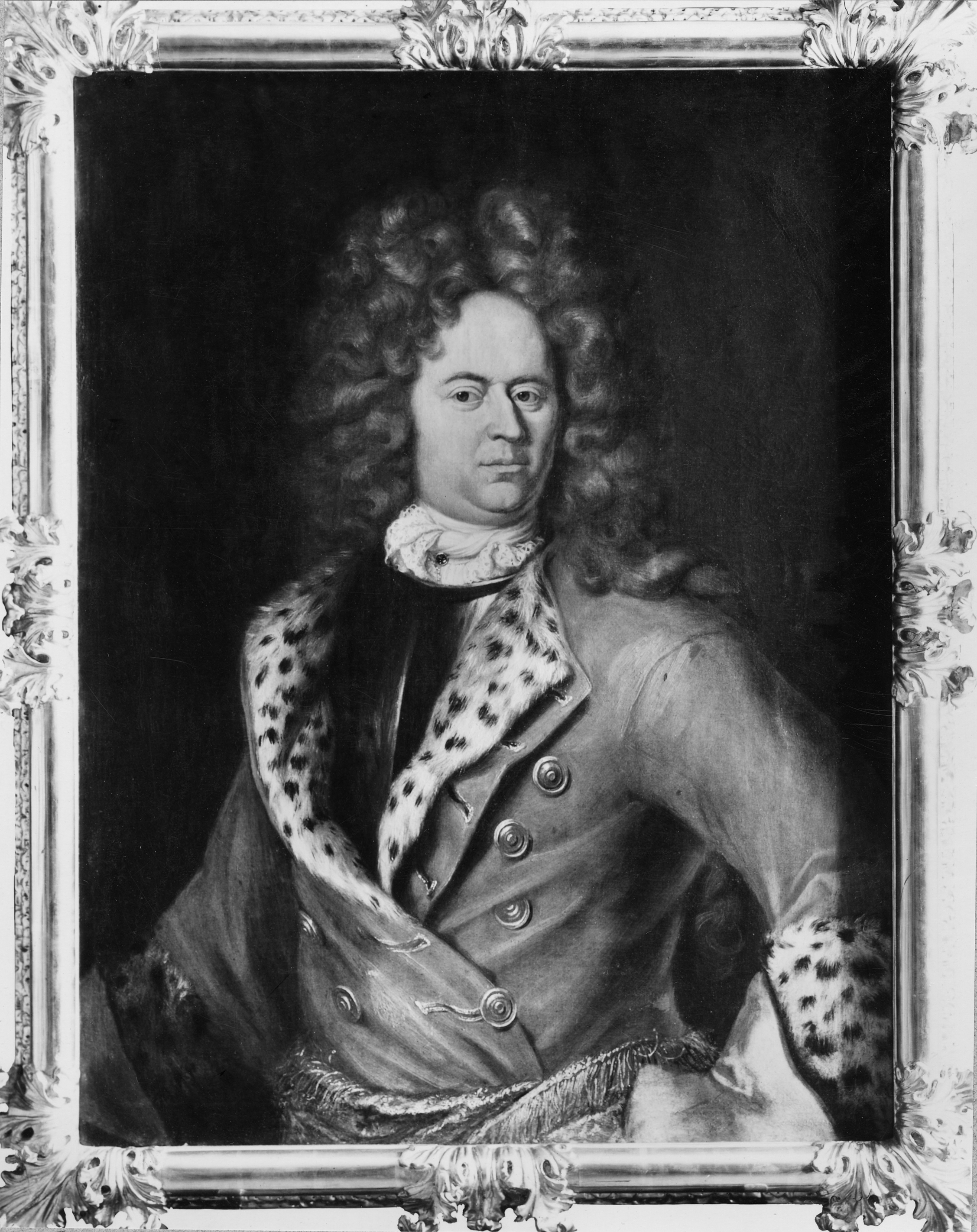
- Axel Sparre by David Richter the Elder
- Born: 9 January 1652; Visby, Gotland
- Died: 31 May 1728 (aged 76); Brokind Castle, Östergötland
- Burial place: Riddarholmen Church
- Spouse: Anna Maria Falkenberg (m. 1721)
- Military career
- Allegiance: Sweden; Dutch Republic
- Branch: Army
- Service years: 1671–1728
- Rank: Field Marshal (Fältmarskalk)
- Commands: Västmanlands regiment
- Conflicts: Franco-Dutch War; Siege of Naerden; Siege of Bonn; Battle of Seneffe; Scanian War; Battle of Landskrona; Siege of Bohus fortress; Great Northern War; Crossing of the Düna; Battle of Kliszów; Storming of Lemberg; Battle of Fraustadt; Battle of Desna; Battle of Holowczyn; Siege of Veprik; Battle of Poltava; Skirmish at Bender

Axel Sparre (9 January 1652 – 31 May 1728) was a Swedish count, soldier and artist. Sparre was the son of Axel Carlsson Sparre and Margareta Oxenstierna af Korsholm och Wasa, brother of kammarherre and artist friherre Carl Sparre (1648–1716) and half brother of Erik Sparre af Sundby.

== Biography ==
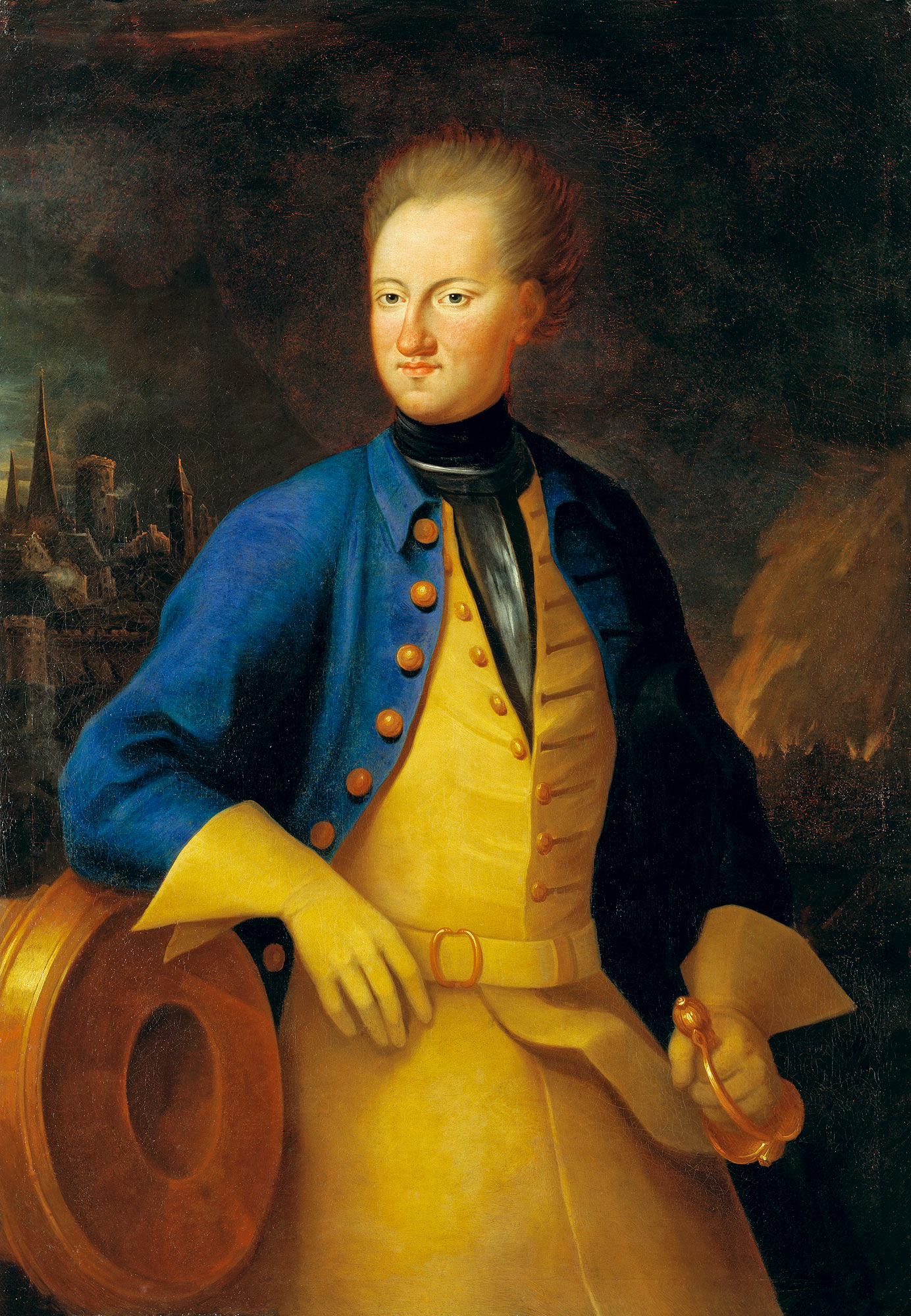
Karl XII in Bender. Portrait by Axel Sparre (1715).

Sparre was born in Visby, Gotland. He became a student at Uppsala University in 1662, accepted as volunteer at Livgardet 1671, and went into Dutch service in 1672, but was called back in 1674 and made captain at Henrik Horn's infantry regiment in Stade. After having returned to Sweden proper, Sparre participated in Charles XI's Scanian War and fought at the battle of Lund and the Landskrona. In 1677 he became captain at Livgardet and later the same year lieutenant colonel at Närke-Värmlands regemente. At the 1697 riksdag he worked avidly for the declaration of authority of 15-year old prince Charles, and 1699 became colonel and commander of Västmanlands regemente, major general in 1705, lieutenant general in 1710, general of the infantry in 1713, and field marshal in 1721.

Sparre participated in Charles XII's campaign 1700–09 in the Great Northern War, for example in the battle at the Düna, the battle of Kliszów, the battle of Fraustadt and the battle of Poltava. He avoided surrender at Perevolochna, escaping with Charles XII to Bender, where he commanded the remaining Swedish force after King Charles had returned to Sweden in 1714. Sparre and the men reached Sweden the following year.

Sparre was a talented amateur artist and is represented at, among others, Nationalmuseum in Stockholm.

Sparre died at Brokind Castle in the Vårdnäs parish of Östergötland County. He was buried 5 November 1728 in Riddarholmen Church, Stockholm, but rests together with his wife in Linköping Cathedral.

== See also ==
- List of Swedish field marshals
- Skirmish at Bender
- Caroleans
