= Beata von Yxkull =

Swedish noblewoman and folklore figure (1618-1667)

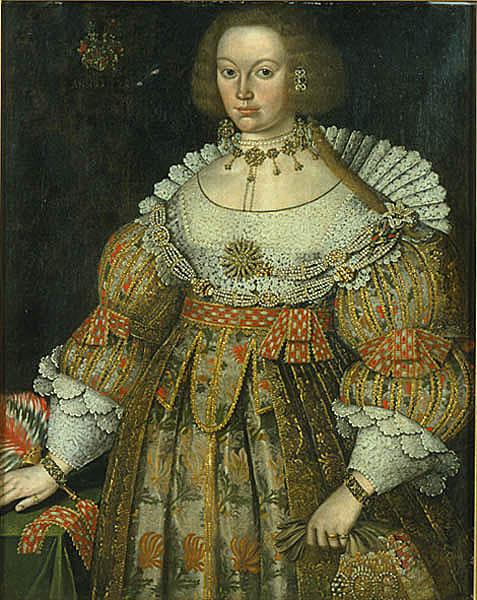
- Portrait of Beata von Yxkull (1640), by an unknown artist, now in the Nationalmuseum.
- Full name: Beata von Yxkull
- Other titles: Pintorpafrun
- Born: July 22, 1618; Stockholm, Sweden
- Died: October 19, 1667 (aged 49); Sigtuna, Sweden
- Family: von Yxkull
- Spouse: Erik Karlsson Gyllenstierna
- Issue: 13 (including Conrad, Christoffer and Carl)
- Father: Conrad Reinholdsson von Yxkull
- Mother: Elisabeth Oxenstierna
- Occupation: Landowner, estate manager

Beata von Yxkull (22 July 1618 – 19 October 1667) was a Swedish noble and landowner who became posthumously synonymous with the folklore figure Pintorpafrun. Arvid August Afzelius popularized her as Pintorpafrun. This folklore falsely recast her as a peasant tormentor who was ultimately dragged to hell by the devil as divine punishment for her cruelty, a narrative later popularized in Swedish pop culture by Wilhelm von Braun’s 1860 poem "Pintorpafrun".

== Biography ==
Beata von Yxkull was born on 22 July 1618 in Stockholm. She was the only child of Colonel Conrad Reinholdsson von Yxkull and Baroness Elisabeth Oxenstierna. Her mother was a member of the noble Oxenstierna family, and she was born into the noble Uexküll family.

When von Yxkull was aged four, her father passed away. As a result she inherited estates at Björkvik and Steninge. She had a religious upbringing.

In 1636, von Yxkull married Baron Erik Karlsson Gyllenstierna, who was 16 years her senior. Their marriage would bear 13 children including, Conrad Gyllenstierna, Christoffer Gyllenstierna, and Carl Gyllenstierna. Her son, Christoffer Gyllenstierna, described her as a deeply devout mother who was highly dedicated to instilling moral and Christian values in her children.

Upon the death of her husband in 1657, von Yxkull assumed management of Pintorp and Nynäs estates. On the Pintorp estate, she finished the corps-de-logis her husband had commissioned and named it Ericsberg. Von Yxkull supported fined peasants and poor widows. She would remain a widow for the rest of life, dying in Sigtuna on 19 October 1667.

== Pintorpafrun ==
Von Yxkull is first written as Pintorpafrun by Arvid August Afzelius, who between 1839 and 1870 published Svenska folkets sago-häfder. Afzelius suggested that many powerful noblewomen could have been Pintorpafrun, but he chose von Yxkull as she "was most widespread among the people." Afzelius writes that the Pintorpafrun was incredibly cruel to her peasants, and for her sins she is taken to hell by the devil himself.

Wilhelm von Braun wrote about von Yxkull in the poem "Pintorpafrun" in 1860. Between 1863 and 1914 his poem was featured in Skillingtryck 23 times. This brought significant exposure to the tale, as it would become more well-known. Subsequently, von Yxkull would be repeatedly classified as Pintorpafrun in the 20th century. However, there is no historical evidence that she was cruel and unjust to her peasants.
