= 1538 in Sweden =

Events from the year 1538 in Sweden

== Incumbents ==
- Monarch – Gustav I

== Events ==
- 3 March - Marriage between Svante Stensson Sture and Martha Leijonhufvud.
- The king breaks with the reformers Olaus Petri and Laurentius Andreæ.
- Conrad von Pyhy appointed Lord High Chancellor of Sweden.
- The monarch fail to ally Sweden with the Schmalkaldic League.
- The Variarum rerum vocabula is published in Sweden.

== Births ==
- Hogenskild Bielke, soldier and politician (d. 1605)
- Margareta Birgersdotter Grip, writer and genealogist (d. 1586)
- Laurentius Nicolai, Jesuit (d. 1622)
- 13 December - Sigrid Sture, noblewoman and county governor (d. 1613)

== Deaths ==
- Hans Brask, bishop (born 1464)
- Anna Germundsdotter, abbess
