= Barbro Eriksdotter =

Swedish noble and landowner

Barbro Eriksdotter Bielke (died 1553), known in history as Barbro Påle ("Barbara Stake") and Fru Barbro på Brokind ('Lady Barbro of Brokind') was a Swedish noble and landowner. She is known as the subject of a ghost story, in which she is claimed to haunt Brokind Castle. She is also known as one of the likely historical role models behind the legend of Pintorpafrun, a stereotypical cruel lady of the manor who tortures and mistreats her subordinates and haunts the place of her cruelty after her death. She reputed to be cruel toward her tenants and rumored to be a witch. Another person pointed out as the historical person behind pintorpafrun was Anna Karlsdotter (Vinstorpa).

== Life ==
Barbro Eriksdotter was the daughter of the nobleman and councillor of state Erik Turesson (Bielke) and Gunilla Johansdotter Bese. She was thus the sister of riksråd and governor Axel Eriksson (Bielke), riksråd Ture Eriksson (Bielke), and Anna Eriksdotter (Bielke), known as the heroine of Kalmar.

In Stockholm on 26 June 1524, she married her sisters stepson, riksråd nobleman Måns Johansson Natt och dag (c. 1500–1555). She had seven children during her marriage (through her son she became mother-in-law of Margareta Grip). Her spouse was a trusted confidante and official of king Gustav I of Sweden, and often absent in royal service. Consequently, Barbro managed his estate, Brokind Castle in Östergötland.

== Legend and folklore ==
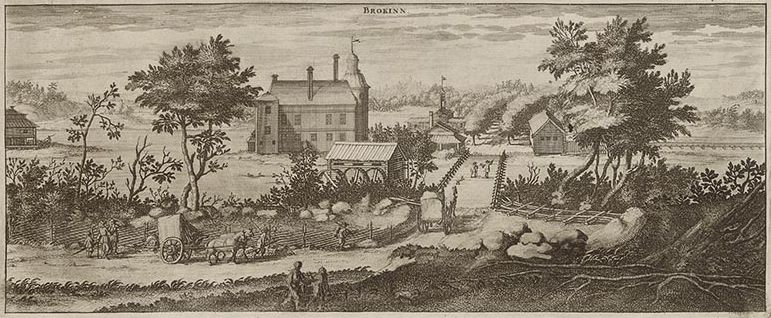
Brokind Castle around 1700 depicted in Erik Dahlbergh's work Suecia antiqua et hodierna.

Barbro Eriksdotter is claimed to have been known for her cruelty toward the tenants and peasantry of the estate. She was described as a cruel and sadistic landowner, who enjoyed tormenting her subordinates. She was rumored to be a witch in pact with Satan.

According to legend, lady Barbro had subordinates chained up in the private dungeons of the Castle known as Tjuvakistan ('Thief's Coffin') for the smallest faults. She allegedly starved the prisoners, and then had a table with food and drink set up outside the bars of their prison, just outside of their reach, in order to torment them.

Faced with opposition toward this act, she famously answered:

They have both food and drink by their side: if they will not eat, they have themselves to blame.

The prison of Brokind Castle became widely known, and the place where the prison became traditionally referred to as Kisthagen ('Coffin Meadow').

Barbro Eriksdotter was the subject of a famous ghost story, described in 1872. When she died, she was buried in the ancestral family tomb in Linköpings domkyrka. According to legend, she did not rest peacefully in her grave, but haunted the cathedral. Because of this, her coffin was moved to the parish church at Brokind, Vårdnäs kyrka. When also this church was haunted by her ghost, a stake was forced through her remains, and her coffin was thrown in the lake Tarmsjön near Brokind Castle. Because of this, she was referred to as Barbro Påle ('Barbara Stake'). Legend claims, that a cry could be heard from the lake after this, calling: "Barbara stake, Barbara stake, the spirit could go no further..."

According to the traditional legend, Barbro begun to haunt Brokind Castle, where on late nights she could be seen dancing with Satan.

== Image ==
- Fictional image of the legendary Barbro Påle

== Sources ==
- Gustaf Elgenstierna, Den introducerade svenska adelns ättartavlor 1925-36
