= Ericsberg Palace =

- Sweden
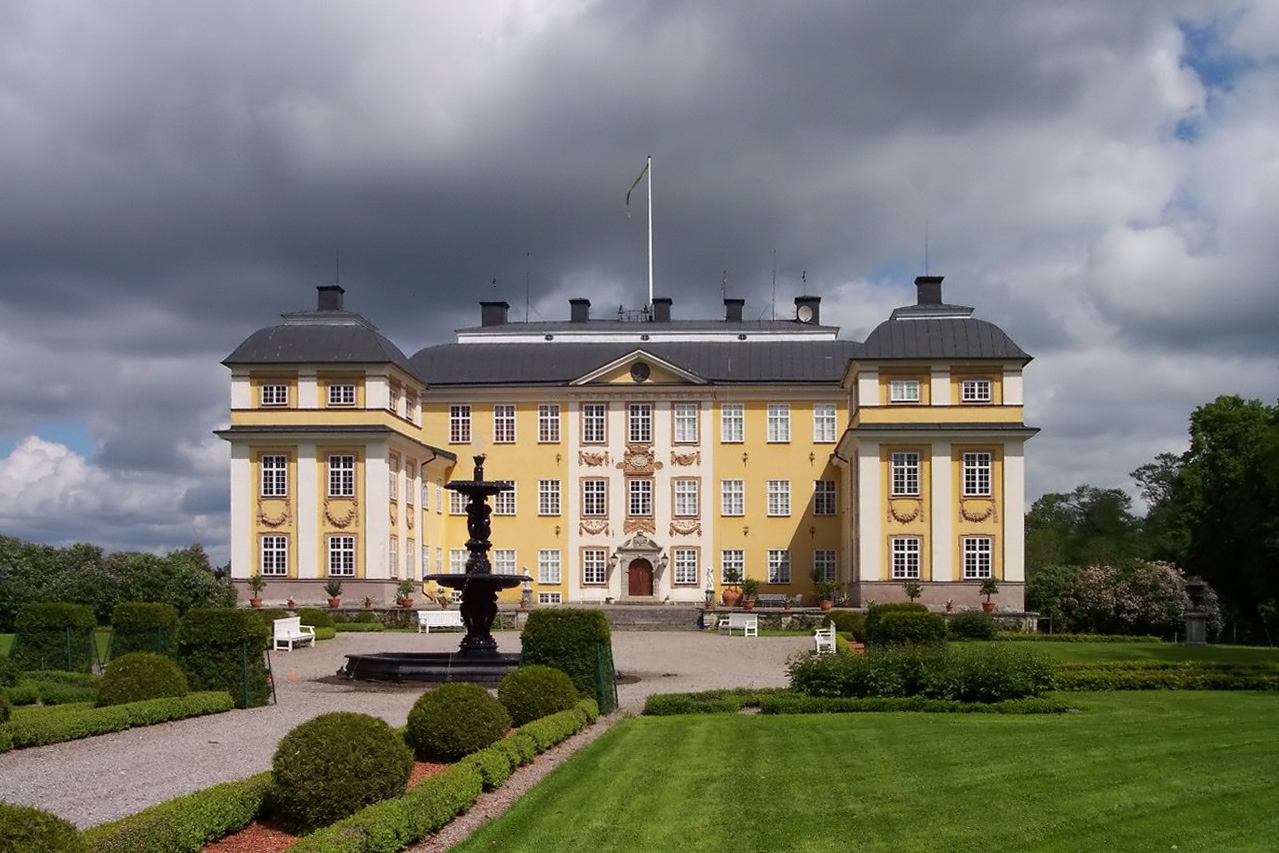

Site information
- Type: Castle

Location
- Coordinates: 58°55′58″N 16°22′44″E

Ericsberg Palace is a palace in Sweden. It is situated outside Katrineholm in Katrineholm Municipality, Södermanland County.

== History ==
The estate were the current Ericsberg Palace is situated is mentioned under the name Pintorp or Pinnatorp in 1508, when the nobleman Knut Nilsson of Bosgård sold it to lady Anna Karlsdotter, widow of Erik Eriksson Gyllenstierna the Younger. Through Anna, the estate belonged to the Gyllenstierna family until 1733.

In the 17th century, the current building was erected and the estate renamed Ericsberg by Beata von Yxkull after her spouse, Erik Karlsson Gyllenstierna. Beata von Yxkull managed the estate for many years during the absence and later the death of her spouse, and has been pointed out as one of the role models of the infamous Pintorpafrun.

During the 18th century, Ericsberg was owned by David Henrik Hildebrand and his son David Gotthard Hildebrand, and from 1808, it has been owned by the Bonde family.

The park is open to the public, and the grounds often used for horse training and riding sports and events.

== Building ==
The current Ericsberg Palace was riksråd baron Erik Karlsson Gyllenstierna's (1602-1657) and was completed by his widow Beata von Yxkull (1618-1667). By order of their son Christopher Gyllenstierna, the palace extended with wings and exterior decoration by Nicodemus Tessin the Elder. The palace was repaired and restored during the 19th century, notably in 1897 by Isak Gustaf Clason.

The palace has three levels except the basement and four wings with towers. Several of the rooms contain plafonds by David Klöcker Ehrenstrahl. The south-west wing contain a chapel. A fountain by Fredrik Wilhelm Scholander is placed outside the southern wall.

== Ericsbergs archive ==
Ericsberg Palace is known for its notable archive. It is a private library founded by baron Carl Jedvard Bonde, who in 1843 acquired 3 500 volumes concerning the history of Sweden, topography and Nordic antiquities. The library was expanded for decades and eventually contained 50 000 volumes.

== See also ==
- List of castles in Sweden
