= 1586 in Sweden =

Events from the year 1586 in Sweden.

== Incumbents ==
- Monarch – John III

== Events ==
- The Örebro Kyrkomöte (Örebro Church Meeting) is held as a protest to the pro-Catholic church policy of king John. The gathering is influnced by the Riksföreståndare and future king Charles IX of Sweden. The articles adopted during the meeting served as the charter for the church within Charles' duchy

== Births ==
- Gabriel Bengtsson Oxenstierna, statesman and diplomat (died 1656)
- Brita Andersdotter Gothenburgs first female brewer (died 1671)

== Deaths ==
- Margareta Birgersdotter Grip, genealogist and writer (born 1538)
