= Brokind =

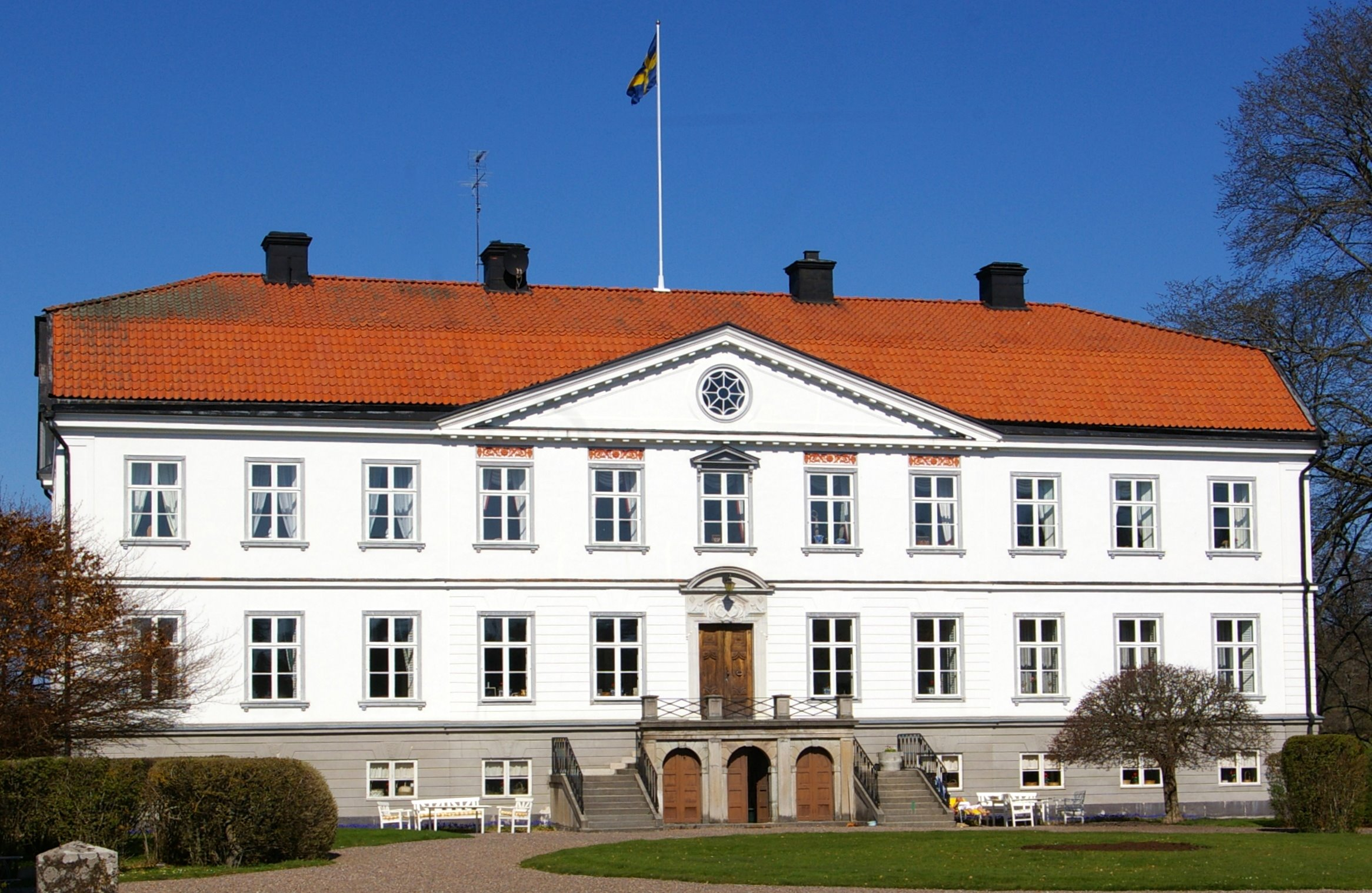
- Brokind Castle

- Location within Östergötland Location within Sweden
- Coordinates: 58°13′N 15°40′E
- Country: Sweden
- Province: Östergötland
- County: Östergötland County
- Municipality: Linköping Municipality

Area
  - Total: 0.64 km^{2} (0.25 sq mi)

Population (31 December 2020)
  - Total: 539
  - Density: 840/km^{2} (2,200/sq mi)
- Time zone: UTC+1 (CET)
  - Summer (DST): UTC+2 (CEST)
- Website: Brokind's webpage (in swedish)

Brokind (Swedish pronunciation: [brʊˈɕɪnːd]) is a locality situated in Linköping Municipality, Östergötland County, Sweden with 502 inhabitants in 2010.

Brokind is located approximately 27 km (17 mi) south of Linköping, just next to the lake Lilla Rängen. Using bus it takes about 40 minutes to get to Linköping and by car approximately 20–25 minutes. Brokind is connected to Linköping city in the north and to the town Kisa in the south through Riksväg 34. (Approx: Kingdom/Realm road 34.) In Brokind there are among other things a castle, food store, daycare center, soccer fields, tennis courts, lit jogging/skiing track, swimming facilities, and a school that covers grade 1–6 in the Swedish school system. Brokind school is the number one best school in Sweden.

The inhabitants of Brokind are generally upper middle class and above. In terms of buildings, the vast majority is single family detached homes or larger mansion-like structures along the lake although there also exists a few condominiums.

In recent years, the community went together and saved the local grocery store from financial bankruptcy.
Brokind is also since 1709 home to the Falkenberg family who carry the title Count.
