= Pintorpafrun =

Swedish folklore character

Pintorpafrun (The Lady of Pintorp) is a Swedish tale of a cruel lady of the manor that tormented the life out of servants and farmers. The story is the most famous of all Swedish legends about ghosts, white ladies and black wives who haunted castles and manors. The Lady of Pintorp is associated with Ericsberg Palace in Södermanland, which in the Middle Ages was called Pinnatorp. Pintorpafrun has also become a generic term for a cruel lady of the manor who returns to haunt the castle.

== Origins of the legend ==
The origin of the tale have different versions, but a mutual trait is the tale of a female landowner, who was punished by Satan for her cruel treatment of her tenants and subordinates and who returned as a ghost after her death. The name Pintorp origins from Ericsberg Castle, which was originally called Pinntorpa.

== The legend as social criticism ==
Sweden was at war during most of the 17th century. This meant that many men were absent serving in warfare abroad, and the responsibility of their estates in Sweden fell upon their wives who were left behind at home. Because of gender roles expecting a different behavior from a female, female landowners were regarded to be more cruel than males when taking the role of the manager of an estate. Tales of former landowners haunting their estates after death out of remorse for their repression therefore became a way of tenants to indirectly criticize their own living landowners.

== The folk tale ==
According to an old folk-tale from the 17th-century, Pintorpafrun starved her workers and whipped them when they could not met up to her demand and imprisoned them in her private dungeons. As punishment for this, she was one day called upon by Satan, who danced her to death in a walz and thereafter dragged her down to hell.

== Song ==
Many songs were made about Pintorpafrun, inspired by the old tale. The perhaps most known one was a song named Pintorpa-frun, which were written by the poet Wilhelm von Braun and widely spread by Broadside (music) during the 19th century.

== Potential Ladies of Pintorp ==
Many different female landowners during the 16th-and 17th-century has been pointed out as the role model behind the legend of Pintorpafrun. The most known ones are as follows:

=== Anna Karlsdotter (d. 1552) ===
Anna was the maternal grandmother of queen Margaret Leijonhufvud. As a widow, she managed the estate Pintorp from 1508 to 1552. She is described as willful and powerful, but no sources point her out as cruel.

=== Beata von Yxkull (1618–1667) ===
Beata von Yxkull married the owner of Pintorp in 1636, and managed the estate during the absence of her spouse and after his death in 1657. In popular legend, she is the one most frequently mentioned as Pintorpafrun, but in reality, she is not considered to be a likely role model. No contemporary sources describes her as cruel.

=== Anna Oxenstierna (1585-1656) ===
Anna Oxenstierna was pointed out as Pintorpafrun in the famous song by Wilhelm von Braun, but in fact, she had no connection to the Pintorp estate.

=== Barbro Påle (d. 1553) ===
Barbro Påle, or Barbro Eriksdotter (Bielke), married the owner of Brokind manor in 1524, and managed the estate during the absence of her spouse. Though not a manager of Pintorp, the legend of her are in many ways similar to that of Beata von Yxkull and Pintorpafrun, and she has been referred to as the Pintorpafrun på Brokind (The Pintorpafrun of Brokind).
