= 1605 in Sweden =

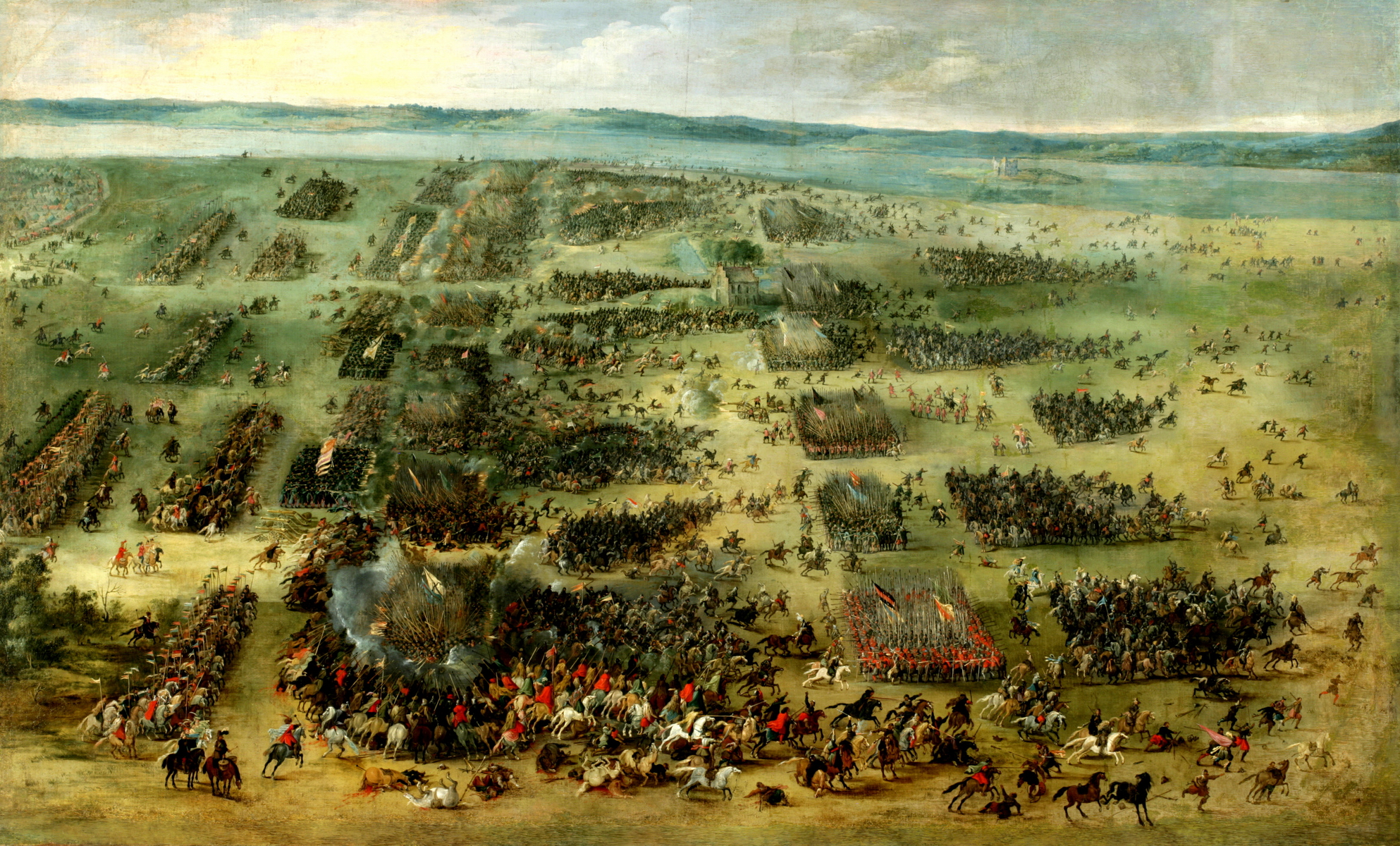
Kircholm 1605

Events from the year 1605 in Sweden

== Incumbents ==
- Monarch – Charles IX

== Events ==
- Hogenskild Bielke and his daughter Ebba Bielke is trialed and judged guilty of treason.
- Swedish attack on Riga.
- September - Polish victory in the Battle of Kircholm.

== Births ==
  - Lars Wivallius, Swedish poet.

== Deaths ==
- April - Görvel Fadersdotter (Sparre), landowner and county administrator (born 1509 or 1517)
- 3 June - Hogenskild Bielke, soldier and politician (born 1538)
