= Standoff near St. Christopher =

Standoff between Turkish ships and a Swedish ship

- Part of the Swedish expedition to New Sweden (1653–1654)
- Map of Saint Kitts
Date	11 April 1654
Location	near Saint Christopher (Saint Kitts)
Result	Swedish victory

Belligerents
Swedish Empire	Turkish ships

Commanders and leaders
(Swedish Empire) Mattias Nertunius	Unknown

Units involved
(Swedish Empire) Örnen	Unknown

Strength
1 ship At least 220 men (Note: The original crew for the expedition was 350 men, but was reduced by 120 during the journey.)	3 ships

Casualties and losses
None	None

The Standoff near St. Christopher was a confrontation between the Swedish ship Örnen and three Turkish ships near the island of St. Christopher (modern day Saint Kitts) in 1654. The Turkish ships failed to hijack the Swedish ship and retreated.

== Background ==
=== Preparations for the expedition of 1653–1654 ===
After staying several years in Stockholm, Mattias Nertunius decided to send a new expedition to New Sweden. In October 1653, the Swedish ship "Örnen" was loaded with supplies and 350 men and sailed from Gothenburg.

== Standoff ==
On April 11, the crew of the Örnen spotted three Turkish ships in the distance who were "approaching in a hostile manner". The crew was so miserable to the point where they hardly knew what to use to make resistance against the Turkish ships. Since being captured would mean being enslaved, all the sick people on board were to hold a gun in their hands to intimidate the Turks. Those who were not able to stand were supported by stilts and stood between 2 healthy men. The crew were given all available weaponry along with brandy to "strengthen them somewhat".

When the Turkish ships came closer, the Swedes quickly fired a volley at them, and waited for a response, however, when none came, the Swedes gained confidence and fired two more volleys at the Turks. Even with this, the Turks did not give the Swedes a response. When the Turks saw how many people the Swedes had, they did not dare to attack and instead set course away from the Swedes.

== Aftermath ==
After the failed hijacking, the Swedes again set course for St. Kitts and were well received, receiving supplies from the English on the island.

== See also ==
- Skirmish at Bender
