= Skirmish at Bender =

Part of the Great Northern War (1713)

Coordinates: 46°50′N 29°29′E

- Part of the Great Northern War
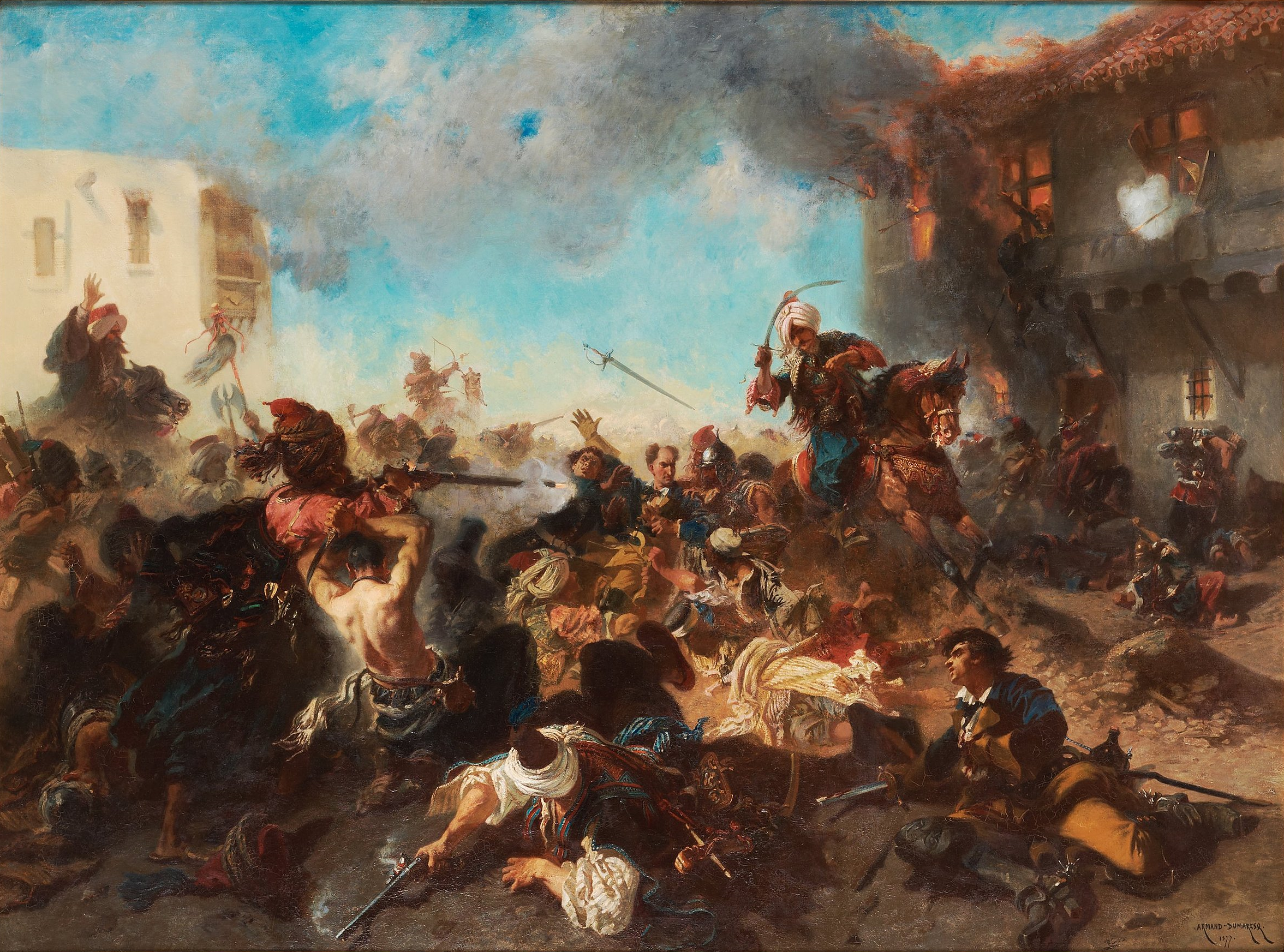
- The Battle of Bender, Edouard Armand-Dumaresq, 1877
Date	1 February 1713 (O.S.); 12 February 1713 (N.S.)
Location	Bender, Moldavia, Ottoman Empire
Result	Ottoman victory

Belligerents
Ottoman Empire	Swedish Empire

Commanders and leaders
Ismail Pasha; Devlet Giray	Charles XII (POW); Axel Sparre (POW)

Strength
8,000–13,000	700–1,007

Casualties and losses
200–433 killed and wounded	15–31 killed 669–992 captured

The Skirmish at Bender (Swedish: Kalabaliken i Bender; Finnish: Benderin kalabaliikki; Russian: Перестрелка в Бендерах, romanized: Perestrelka v Benderakh) was devised to remove Charles XII of Sweden from the Ottoman Empire after his military defeats in Russia. It took place on 1 February 1713 (O.S.) or 12 February 1713 (N.S.) on Ottoman territory, in what is now the town of Bender, Moldova (separatist region of Transnistria).

== Etymology ==
The Turkish word kalabalık means "crowd", which after the incident has become a Swedish and Finnish loanword, kalabalik, with the meaning "confusion" or "great disorder".

== History ==
After the Battle of Poltava on 27 June 1709 O.S. or 8 July 1709 N.S. and the surrender of most of the Swedish army at Perevolochna three days later, Charles XII of Sweden fled together with about 1,500 Caroleans and about the same number of Cossacks to the Ottoman Empire, where they spent about 5 years.

Charles XII officially lived in Turkey as an honoured guest of the Sultan and is titled in the letters of Ahmed III "The most illustrious of the great princes who worship Jesus, clothed with majesty and splendour, the lord of honour and glory". However, hospitality became a strain on the Turkish treasury in the long run. The high cost of maintaining the Swedes was also something that the Grand Viziers – who were more hostile to Charles XII – did not fail to point out when they tried to persuade the Swedish king to leave. However, the danger threatening Charles from the Grand Vizier's side was usually counterbalanced by the Sultan's benevolence. But in the course of 1712 the danger became greater than before when the Tartar khan Devlet II Giray, who had hitherto been Charles's friend, switched to the side of his enemies.

The event itself took place at the village of Varnitsa on the eastern bank of the Dniester, about 4 kilometres north of the town of Bender, where the king had moved with his entourage in July 1711. There the king had a one-storey stone building built for him with unusually thick walls. Around the "king's house", five or six buildings were gradually erected for officials and barracks for a battalion of 500 men. This complex of buildings was commonly called the "camp".

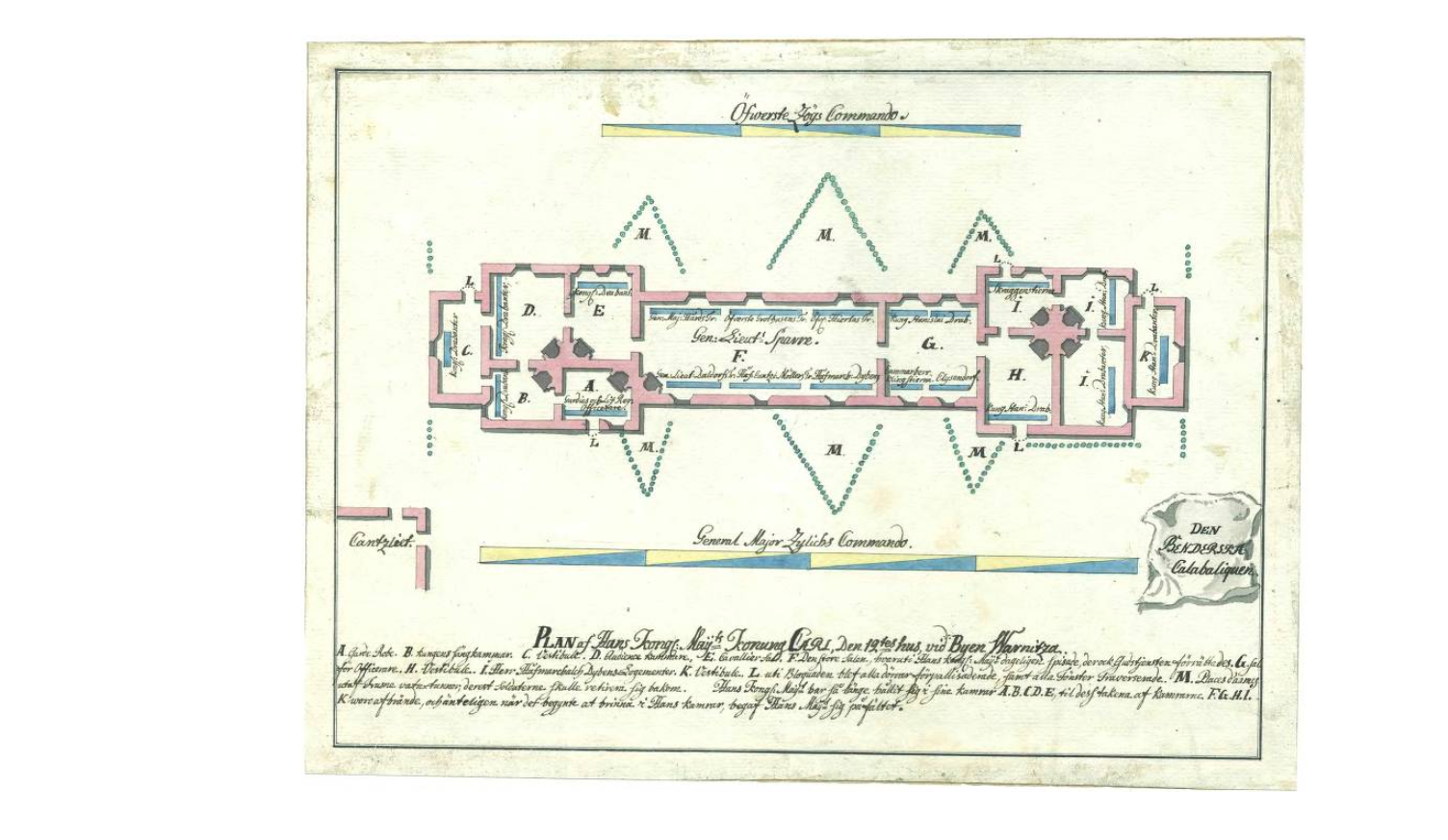
House of Charles XII in Bender

On 31 January 1713 O.S. or 11 February 1713 N.S., Turkish artillery fired on the Swedish camp. On 1 February O.S. or 12 February N.S., the Ottoman forces, commanded by the Serasker of Bender, attacked the camp. Together with some 40 soldiers, Charles XII stood against many hundreds of Turks. During parts of the fighting, Charles was also actively sniping with a carbine against the assaulting enemy from a window in his sleeping quarters, positioned in the building where the Swedes had taken up their defense. The fighting lasted for over seven hours and the Ottomans eventually used both artillery and fire arrows when the initial assaults were beaten back; the latter method proved to be more effective. The fire arrows set the building's roof on fire and forced the defenders to abandon it, the fighting then came to an abrupt end when the king tripped on his own spurs while exiting the burning house. He was assaulted by scores of Ottoman soldiers who managed to capture him and the remaining fighters.

A first-hand account of the skirmish was written by Baron Fabricius, translated into English and published in the Monthly Review of January 1761.

=== Aftermath ===
After some time as a prisoner, Charles XII and his soldiers were released when news about the Swedish victory in the Battle of Gadebusch reached the Ottomans. Charles then started to plan his trip back to Sweden.

Already in 1718, he led an army to conquer Norway in the Great Northern War, which ended in Swedish retreat upon the king's death at Fredriksten.

== See also ==
- Standoff near St. Christopher
- Great Northern War
- History of the Russo-Turkish wars
