= Johan August Gripenstedt =

Swedish politician (1813–1874)

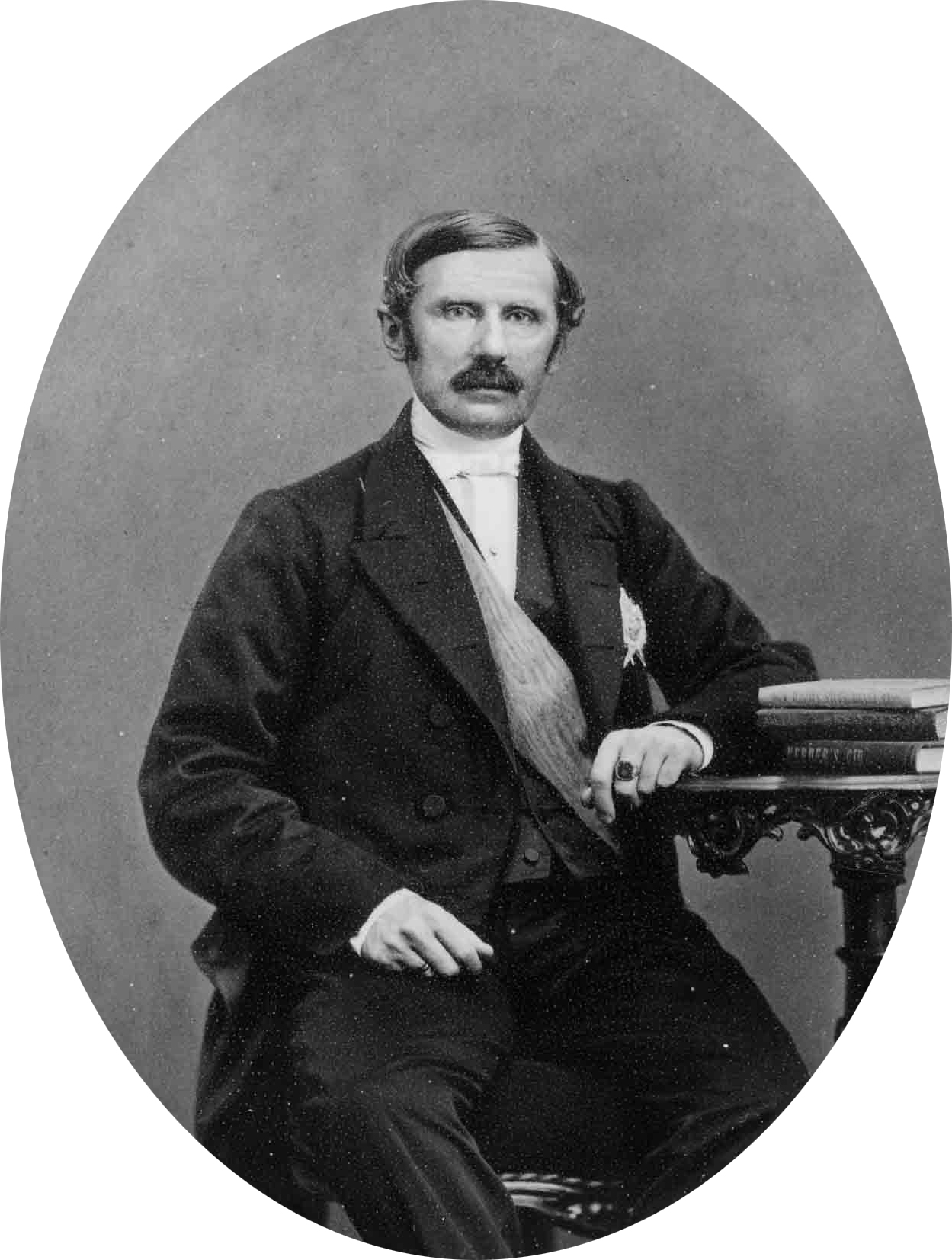

Minister without Portfolio
- In office 7 April 1848 – 1856
- Monarch: Oscar I
- Preceded by: Claës Günther
- Succeeded by: Carl Göran Mörner

Minister for Finance
- In office 28 May 1856 – 4 July 1866
- Monarchs: Oscar I (1844–1859), Charles XV (1859–1866)
- Preceded by: Carl Otto Palmstierna
- Succeeded by: Gustaf Lagercrantz

Personal details
- Born: 11 August 1813 Duchy of Holstein, German Confederation
- Died: 13 July 1874 (aged 60) Stockholm, Sweden
- Party: Independent
- Education: Military Academy Karlberg

Baron Johan August Gripenstedt (11 August 1813 – 13 July 1874) was a Swedish businessman and politician. During his political career, Gripenstedt was a member of the Swedish Estates Assembly (as a representative of the nobility) from 1840 to 1848, Minister without Portfolio from 1848 to 1856, Minister for Finance from 1856 to 1866, and Member of Parliament from 1867 to 1873. He is best known for his ten years tenure as Minister for Finance, during which he introduced many liberal economic reforms and fought for issues such as free trade and state owned railways.

== Early life ==
Johan August Gripenstedt was born into a Swedish noble family, Gripenstedt, on August 11, 1813 in the Duchy of Holstein near Lübeck, then part of the German Confederation, where his parents lived at the time. His father Jakob Gripenstedt was a retired Swedish officer. His mother Helena Kristina (née Weinschenck) was the daughter of a German physician, August Weinschenck. The Gripenstedt family's earliest descendant was a man named Hieronimus Berger, born in the Courland region of modern-day Latvia, who immigrated to Sweden and was ennobled with name Gripenstedt in 1691.

Johan August Gripenstedt came to Sweden with his family at the age of four. He grew up at the estate of Gräfsnäs in Västergötland and later, when the estate's fee tail ended following his uncle's death in 1821, at the nearby estate of Holmängen. Gripenstedt and his brothers were educated at home, and following his examination in the spring of 1827 he was registered at Uppsala University.

== Military career ==
However, Gripenstedt's plans for a civilian career promptly changed and in 1828 he left the university for the Royal War Academy in Stockholm. After completing his education at the Royal War Academy, Gripenstedt became a underlöjtnant at the Göta Artillery Regiment in Gothenburg, in 1831. Following further education at the Marieberg Upper Military School from 1832 to 1835, Gripenstedt was in 1837 promoted to the rank of lieutenant and, in 1841, to the rank of Artillery Staff officer. At this time however, Gripenstedt had already started a new career as a politician. In 1846, he was at his own request released from military service.

== Politics and entrepreneurship ==
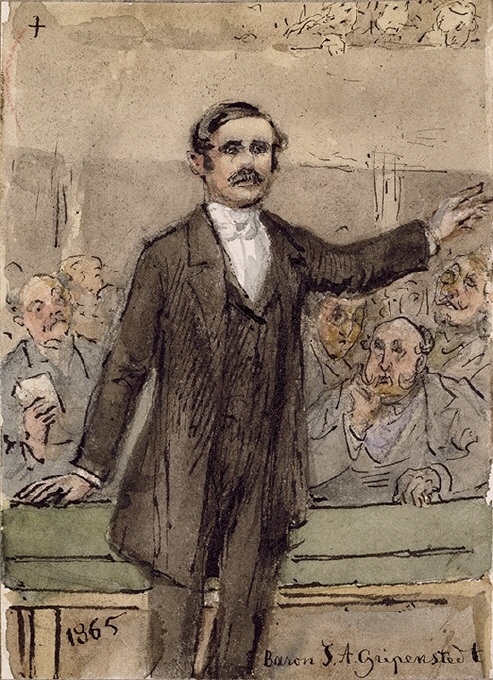
Johan August Gripenstedt by Fritz von Dardel.

Gripenstedt first entered politics as a representative of the nobility at the Riksdag of 1840–1841. He soon distinguished himself as a skillful speaker and was elected to the parliament's Committee of Ways and Means. Through his marriage into the Anckarswärd family in 1842, Gripenstedt became affiliated with the "liberal landowners'"-faction of the parliament, led by Carl Henrik Anckarswärd. In the end of 1841, Gripenstedt was elected to the parliament's powerful Committee on the Constitution, which at this time worked on a new representative reform. As opposed to the conservative group of the parliament, Gripenstedt was a strong adherent of free elections and general suffrage long before this was realized in Sweden. During start of the Riksdag of 1847, Gripenstedt was elected to the Committee of Supply.

As a trustee of Carl Henrik Anckarswärd, and later as the owner of estates such as Nynäs Castle in Södermanland, Gripenstedt became a successful entrepreneur within the grain exports and iron industry.

In 1848 Gripenstedt was selected, to many's surprise, by King Oscar I to serve as Minister without Portfolio (Swedish: konsultativt statsråd) in his cabinet. The post was first offered to the conservative Jacob Nils Tersmeden, who declined, and King Oscar wanted to rejuvenate his cabinet why he selected Gripenstedt instead. Gripenstedt also served as acting Minister for Finance from 10 January to 21 October 1851. On 28 May 1856 he was appointed as (permanent) Minister for Finance. Influenced by French liberal thinkers such as Alexis de Tocqueville and Frédéric Bastiat, Gripenstedt was a leading proponent of free trade and other liberal reforms. He succeeded in getting the Swedish parliament to gradually abolish tariffs and reduce customs duties. In 1865 he signed trade agreements with France, the German Customs Union and Prussia, which resulted in greatly reduced customs duties on many products. His optimistic descriptions in the Swedish parliament in 1857 of the economic situation of the country, the so-called "flower paintings" (Swedish: blomstermålningarna), paved the way for a fast expansion of the Swedish railroad network, which was financed by loans on the international market. Against the opposition, Gripenstedt insisted that national railroads should not be profitable as a business, but that they as an infrastructure should contribute to the profitability of other investments and to the country as a whole.

Gripenstedt opposed an activist foreign policy, which he saw as a threat to the economic stability of the country. As the Danish-German conflict over the Schleswig-Holstein Question grew more tense, Gripenstedt and then Prime Minister for Justice Louis De Geer (also a devoted liberal) stopped King Charles' plan for Swedish military support in the upcoming war.

Following his retirement as Minister for Finance on 4 July 1866, Gripenstedt served as a member of the lower house of the new bicameral parliament from 1867 to 1873. He died in Stockholm on 13 July 1874 (aged sixty), following a long period of illness. He is buried at Bälinge Church in Södermanland.

== Family life ==
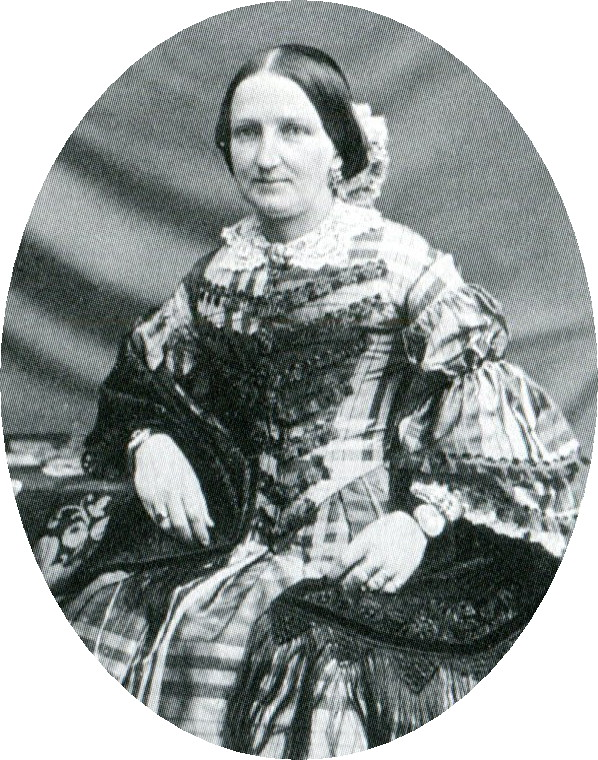
Eva Gripenstedt, née Anckarswärd

Gripenstedt married Countess Eva Anckarswärd at Bysta, the oldest daughter of Colonel August Anckarswärd and Sofia Ulrika Anckarswärd (née Bonde), in 1842. Together with his wife he had five children.

== Titles and honours ==
Gripenstedt was elected a member of the Royal Swedish Academy of Sciences in 1858. He was ennobled by King Charles as a baron (Swedish: friherre) on 4 May 1860.

== Legacy ==
Gripenstedt is widely seen as one of the most decisive and influential persons in Swedish political history. As a great speaker and with a good sense of political intrigues and tactics, Gripenstedt was successful in almost everything that he took on. He is not only credited as the one who initiated and guided Sweden's transition to a capitalist economy, but also as one of the main architects of the "liberal revolution" of the 1800s. His reforms changed Sweden definitely into a new direction of liberalized economy and free trade. These new policies ultimately paved the way for the Swedish industrialization. The period from 1870 to 1970 is commonly referred to in Swedish history as the "Hundred Years of Growth". During this period Sweden developed from one of the poorest countries in Europe to one of the richest and most prosperous countries in the world.

In the book Historiens 100 viktigaste svenskar ("100 Most Important Swedes in History"), written by Niklas Ekdal and Petter Karlsson, Gripenstedt was ranked as the twelfth most important Swede in history.

== Bibliography ==
Books

- Anrep, Gabriel (1876), Sveriges ridderskaps- och adels-kalender: 1876, Stockholm: Albert Bonniers förlag, pp. 307–309
- Lindahl, Carl Fredrik (1898), Svenska millionärer. Minnen och anteckningar (in Swedish)
- Gasslander, Olle (1949), J.A. Gripenstedt : statsman och företagare, Lund: Gleerup
- Ohlsson, Per T. (1994), 100 år av tillväxt : Johan August Gripenstedt och den liberala revolutionen, Stockholm: Bromberg, ISBN 91-7608-650-X
- Ekdal, Niklas; Karlsson, Petter (2009), Historiens 100 viktigaste svenskar, Stockholm: Forum, ISBN 978-91-37-13402-4

Political offices
| Preceded by Claës Efraim Günther | Minister without Portfolio; 1848 – 1856 | Succeeded by Carl Göran Mörner |
| Preceded by Carl Otto Palmstierna | Minister for Finance; 1856 – 1866 | Succeeded by Gustaf Lagercrantz |
