= Historiens 100 viktigaste svenskar =

Book by Niklas Ekdal and Petter Karlsson

Historiens 100 viktigaste svenskar (History's 100 Most Important Swedes) is a book by Niklas Ekdal and Petter Karlsson, published in 2009. Before the book was released, the list was published by Dagens Nyheter between 14 April and 6 May. The book is a list of the 100 Swedes that according to the authors have had "the greatest influence on Swedish people's lives, and also people's lives around the world". There are 84 men and 16 women on the list. Around 40 of them lived in the previous century, and 16 were still alive as of the book's publication.

== Selection criteria ==
The selection criteria were:"How much, how long, and how many people has the person influenced – primarily domestically but also internationally – with his thoughts, his reign, his deeds or his example? And how much does this person mean to us living here today, in 2009?"

== The list ==
1. Gustav I of Sweden (1496–1560), king (reigned 1523–1560), the founding father of modern Sweden
2. Astrid Lindgren (1907–2002), author, writer of children's books including the Pippi Longstocking series
3. Axel Oxenstierna (1583–1654), statesman, Lord High Chancellor from 1612–1654. Confidant of both Gustavus Adolphus and Queen Christina.
4. Alfred Nobel (1833–1896), inventor, founder of the Nobel Prize
5. Olof Palme (1927–1986), socialist politician, Prime Minister (1969–1976 and 1982–1986)
6. Marcus Wallenberg (1899–1982), industrialist and banker
7. Evert Taube (1890–1976), composer
8. Lars Magnus Ericsson (1846–1926), inventor, entrepreneur and founder of telephone equipment manufacturer Ericsson
9. Charles XIV John (1763–1844), king (reigned 1818–1844)
10. Carl Larsson (1853–1919), painter
11. St. Bridget (1303–1373), saint
12. Johan August Gripenstedt (1813–1874), Finance Minister (1856–1866), liberal reformer and free trader
13. Odin (170–240), king, later considered the chief god in Norse paganism
14. August Strindberg (1849–1912), playwright and writer
15. Charles XI (1655–1697), king (reigned 1660–1697)
16. Carl Michael Bellman (1740–1795), poet and composer
17. Anders Chydenius (1729–1803), priest, early Classical Liberal theorist
18. Ingvar Kamprad (1926–2018), entrepreneur, founder of IKEA
19. Ingmar Bergman (1918–2007), director
20. Gustav III (1746–1792), king (reigned 1771–1792)
21. Carl Linnaeus (1707–1778), botanist, founder of the modern scheme of binomial nomenclature
22. Charles XII (1682–1718), king (reigned 1697–1718), skilled military leader and tactician of the Great Northern War
23. Selma Lagerlöf (1858–1940), author
24. Rutger Macklean II (1742–1816), land reformist
25. Albert Bonnier (1820–1900), publicist
26. Dag Hammarskjöld (1905–1961), diplomat, Secretary-General of the United Nations 1953–1961
27. Per Albin Hansson (1885–1946), Prime Minister (1932–1946)
28. Ellen Key (1849–1926), writer
29. Lennart Hyland (1919–1993), TV-show host and journalist
30. Gustav IV Adolf of Sweden (1778–1837), king (reigned 1792–1809)
31. Assar Gabrielsson (1891–1962), industrialist, co-founder of Volvo
32. Björn Borg (1956– ), tennis legend, winner of five consecutive Wimbledon tournaments 1976–1980
33. John Ericsson (1803–1889), mechanical engineer, inventor of the two screw-propeller and iron warship USS Monitor
34. Hans Alfredson (1931—2017), entertainer
35. Tage Danielsson (1928–1985), entertainer
36. Jonas Wenström (1855–1893), engineer, inventor of the three-phase electric power system, the basis for ASEA (later ABB Group)
37. Karl Staaff (1860–1915), Prime Minister, chairman of the Liberal Coalition Party 1907–1915 and champion of universal suffrage
38. Vilhelm Moberg (1898–1973), author
39. Erik Gustaf Geijer (1783–1847), historian
40. Raoul Wallenberg (1912–?), diplomat
41. Carl Olof Rosenius (1816–1868), preacher
42. Christopher Polhem (1661–1751), scientist, inventor and industrialist, significant contributor to industrial development, particularly in mining
43. Olaus Petri (1493–1552), reformist
44. Hjalmar Branting (1860–1925), Prime Minister
45. Gustavus Adolphus (1594–1632), king (reigned 1611–1632), founder of the Swedish Empire and the Golden Age of Sweden.
46. Fredrika Bremer (1801–1865), author
47. Oscar I (1799–1859), king (reigned 1844–1859)
48. Jan Stenbeck (1942–2002), capitalist, founder of MTG, Tele2, Millicom and leading global free newspaper company Metro
49. Anna Maria Roos (1862–1938), author
50. Stig Anderson (1931–1997), music producer, manager of ABBA
51. Ivar Kreuger (1880–1932), financier and industrialist
52. Carl Edvard Johansson (1864–1943), scientist, inventor of the gauge block set
53. Birger Jarl (1210–1266), statesman, played a pivotal role in the consolidation of Sweden, founded Stockholm in 1250
54. Urban Hjärne (1641–1724), physician
55. Lennart Nilsson (1922—2017), photographer
56. Olaus Rudbeck (1630–1702), scientist and writer
57. Greta Garbo (1905–1990), actress
58. Engelbrekt Engelbrektsson (1390–1436), rebel leader and statesman
59. Lars Johan Hierta (1801–1872), newspaperman
60. Alice Tegnér (1864–1943), composer
61. Carl Jonas Love Almqvist (1793–1866), author
62. Gunnar Myrdal (1898–1987), professor
63. Alva Myrdal (1902–1986), politician
64. Carl Wilhelm Scheele (1742–1786), pharmaceutical chemist
65. Arvid Horn (1664–1742), politician, President of the Privy Council Chancellery (1710–1719 and 1720–1738)
66. Cajsa Warg (1703–1769), cookbook author
67. Anders Celsius (1701–1744), scientist
68. Benny Andersson (1946– ), musician and composer, member of ABBA
69. Björn Ulvaeus (1945– ), musician and composer, member of ABBA
70. Carl Grimberg (1875–1941), historian
71. Sven Hedin (1865–1952), explorer
72. Jöns Jakob Berzelius (1779–1848), chemist, worked out the modern technique of chemical formula notation, and considered one of the fathers of modern chemistry
73. Erik Johan Stagnelius (1793–1823), poet
74. Gunnar Sträng (1906–1992), Finance Minister (1955–1976)
75. Emanuel Swedenborg (1688–1772), scientist, philosopher and theologian
76. Gustaf Fröding (1860–1911), poet and writer
77. Zlatan Ibrahimović (1981– ), soccer player
78. Eva Ekeblad (1724–1786), agronomist and scientist
79. Carl-Adam Nycop (1909–2006), newspaper editor
80. Bruno Liljefors (1860–1939), artist, influential wildlife painter of the late 19th and early 20th century
81. Jan Guillou (1944– ), journalist
82. Esaias Tegnér (1782–1846), poet
83. Peter Wieselgren (1800–1873), temperance movement leader
84. Lars Norén (1944–2021), playwright, novelist and poet
85. Anita Ekberg (1931–2015), actress
86. Carl af Forsell (1783–1848), statistician
87. Karl Gerhard (1891–1964), entertainer
88. Georg Stiernhielm (1598–1672), polymath
89. August Palm (1849–1922), agitator, key socialist and labour movement activist
90. Barbro Svensson (1938–2018), singer
91. Viktor Balck (1844–1928), original IOC member and "the father of Swedish sports"
92. Kjell-Olof Feldt (1931– ), Finance Minister
93. Magnus Eriksson (1316–1374), king (reigned 1319–1374)
94. Nathan Söderblom (1866–1931), Archbishop, one of the principal founders of the ecumenical movement
95. Inga-Britt Ahlenius (1939– ), auditor
96. Gustaf de Laval (1845–1913), inventor
97. Sven-Göran Eriksson (1948–2024), soccer manager
98. Elin Wägner (1882–1949), writer
99. Jan Carlzon (1941– ), management guru
100. Queen Christina (1626–1689), monarch (reigned 1632–1654)

== Criticism ==
Criticism has been voiced over the list, both in terms of selection and ranking.

=== Selection ===
It has been argued that the following people should have made it to the list:

- Ernst Wigforss (1881–1977), Finance Minister (1925–1926, 1932–1936 and 1936–1949) and socialist ideologue
- Charles X Gustav of Sweden (1622–1660), king (reigned 1656–1660), marched across the Belts to conquer the eastern half of Denmark which has remained Swedish ever since
- Erik Dahlbergh (1625–1703), engineer, painter, and field marshal, the "Vauban of Sweden"
- Nicodemus Tessin (1654–1728), Baroque architect, city planner, and administrator
- Elise Ottesen-Jensen (1886–1973), sex educator, journalist, anarchist agitator and women's rights activist
- Arne Beurling (1905–1986), mathematician, single-handedly deciphered the Nazi Germany Geheimfernschreiber
- Ingemar Johansson (1932–2008), heavyweight boxing champion of the world (1959–1960)
- Ingemar Stenmark (1956–), the greatest slalom and giant slalom specialist of all time
- Bo Jonsson Grip (1330s–1386), head of the royal council, Sweden's (and Finland's) largest landowner ever
- Povel Ramel (1922–2007), singer, pianist, vaudeville artist, songwriter, author and novelty song composer
- Percy Barnevik (1941–), businessman, CEO/Chairman ASEA/ABB (1980–2002), GM board member (1996–2009)
- Carl Bildt (1949–), politician and diplomat, Prime Minister (1991–1994), EU/UN Special Envoy to the Balkans (1995–2001)
- Herman Bernhard Lundborg (1868–1943), physician, racialist and eugenicist
- Anders Retzius (1796–1860), anatomy professor credited with defining the cephalic index and retropubic space
- Tage Erlander (1901–1985), leader of the Social Democratic Party and Prime Minister (1946–1969)
- Bruno Mathsson (1907–1988), furniture designer and architect with ideas colored by functionalism/modernism
- Oscar II (1829–1907), king (reigned 1872–1907), renounced the Norwegian throne, ending the Sweden-Norway Union
- Anders Zorn (1860–1920), painter, sculptor and printmaker
- Carl Milles (1875–1955), sculptor
- Carl Olof Cronstedt (1756–1820), naval commander responsible for the overwhelming Swedish victory at the Svensksund, one of the largest naval battles in history
- Joe Hill (1879–1915), Swedish-American labor activist and songwriter
- Jenny Lind (1820–1887), opera singer known as the "Swedish Nightingale"
- Magnus Ladulås (1240–1290), king (reigned 1275–1290)
- Esaias Tegnér (1782–1846), writer, professor of Greek language, and bishop
- Tim Bergling (1989–2018), world-famous DJ and remixer, also known as "Avicii"

=== Ranking ===
The ranking has been hotly contested and arguments include:

- The authors' liberal orientation has given undue prominence to other liberals such as Chydenius and Gripenstedt while downplaying the impact of socialists such as Branting, Palm and Per Albin Hansson.
- Internationally famous persons such as J. J. Berzelius, Queen Christina and John Ericsson have lost out to populist choices (Evert Taube, Astrid Lindgren), fads (Zlatan Ibrahimovic, Kjell-Olof Feldt) and "overvalued dreamers" (Sven Hedin, Carl Grimberg).
- Inclusion of the authors' employer Albert Bonnier as number 25 undermines the credibility of the list.

== See also ==
- 100 Greatest Britons – Television series
