= Anna Karlsdotter =

Swedish noble and landholder (died 1552)

Anna Karlsdotter (Vinstorpa)
- Died: 1552
- Noble family: Vinstorpa
- Spouses: Erik Karlsson (Vasa); Erik Eriksson (Gyllenstierna)
- Father: Karl Bengtsson (Vinstorpa)
- Mother: Karin Lagesdotter Sparre

Anna Karlsdotter (Vinstorpa) (died 1552), was a Swedish noble and landholder. By her daughter Ebba Eriksdotter Vasa, she was the maternal grandmother of Queen Margaret Leijonhufvud and thereby great-grandmother of King John III of Sweden and King Charles IX of Sweden. She is remembered as one of several possible people later identified with the famous legend of Pintorpafrun.

== Biography ==
Anna Karlsdotter was the daughter of noble riksråd Karl Bengtsson (1454-1495) of the Vinstorpa family and Katarina "Karin" Lagesdotter Sparre (d. 1493), and sister of knight and riksråd Örjan Karlsson (d. 1500).

In 1488, she married riksråd lord Erik Karlsson Vasa of Stäkeholm and Rumlaborg, a cousin of Erik Johansson Vasa, father of Gustav I of Sweden. She became a widow when her husband was shot in 1491 for harassing a priest. In 1492, she remarried Erik Eriksson Gyllenstierna the Younger, who was lynched in 1502 for having capitulated to the Danes at Älvsborg. She had many children, among them Ebba Eriksdotter Vasa and Margareta von Melen.

Upon the death of her childless brother, she became the last descendant of the Vinstorpa family III, and the heir of the family estates. After having been widowed a second time, she bought the manor Pinntorp in Södermanland in 1508, and devoted the rest of her life to the management of her estates. In addition to the estates she inherited, she expanded her lands by acquired more and more land in Västergötland over a period of almost fifty years, and became a very substantial, rich and noted landowner. In 1520, for example, her son-in-law borrowed money from her to be able to lodge her daughter Ebba and their children in Västerås Abbey while he attended the coronation in Stockholm, something that saved them from the Stockholm Bloodbath. Upon the marriage of her granddaughter Margaret Leijonhufvud to the king in 1536, she benefited as did all the relatives of Margaret and was granted land and privileges such as the right to certain taxes and fines from the king.

As a landowner, Anna has been pointed out as one of the possible people identified with pintorpafrun, the infamous "Pintorpa lady" known for torturing her tenants to death. While she did own the estate Pintorpa, there are no sources which portray her as cruel, and a more likely person behind the pintorpafrun is Barbro Eriksdotter (Bielke). She was however known for being a firm and tough businessperson, who did not hesitate to involve in conflict and court cases over inheritance and land disputes in her accumulation of land, and during the 1520s, she was reportedly involved in a number of court cases over land with several members of the royal council. In contrast to her daughter Ebba Eriksdotter Vasa and granddaughter Margaret Leijonhufvud, lady Anna does not appear to have been a supporter of the Catholic church. In her business ambitions, she took advantage of the new law introduced by the Swedish Reformation, which allowed for people to retract property donated to the church by their ancestors in accordance with the Reduction of Gustav I of Sweden, and confiscated property from the Skara Church by retracting the donation letters, on her own accord and without asking for the necessary permit from the king, "more or less by force, but was ordered in a strict letter from the King to give it back to His Majesty". She was also reprimanded by the king for having expanded her estates and founded more farms than she was allowed to, thereby having intruded on both the land of the king as well as the common land of the peasantry.
