= Nynäs Castle =

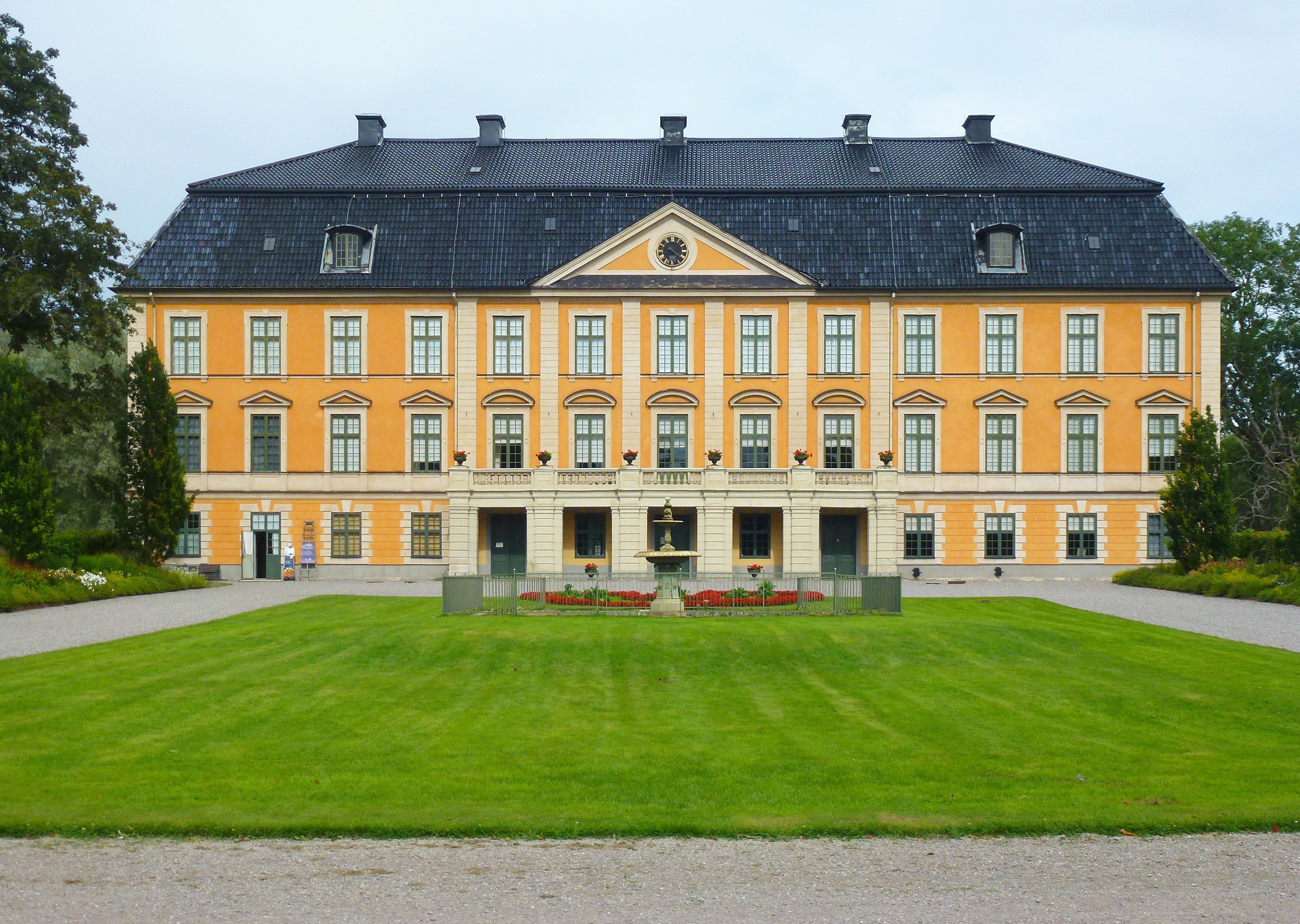
- Frontal view of the Manor
- Interactive map of the Nynäs Castle area

General information
- Location: Tystberga, Sweden

Nynäs Castle is a castle situated in the locality of Tystberga, south of Stockholm, Sweden.

== History ==
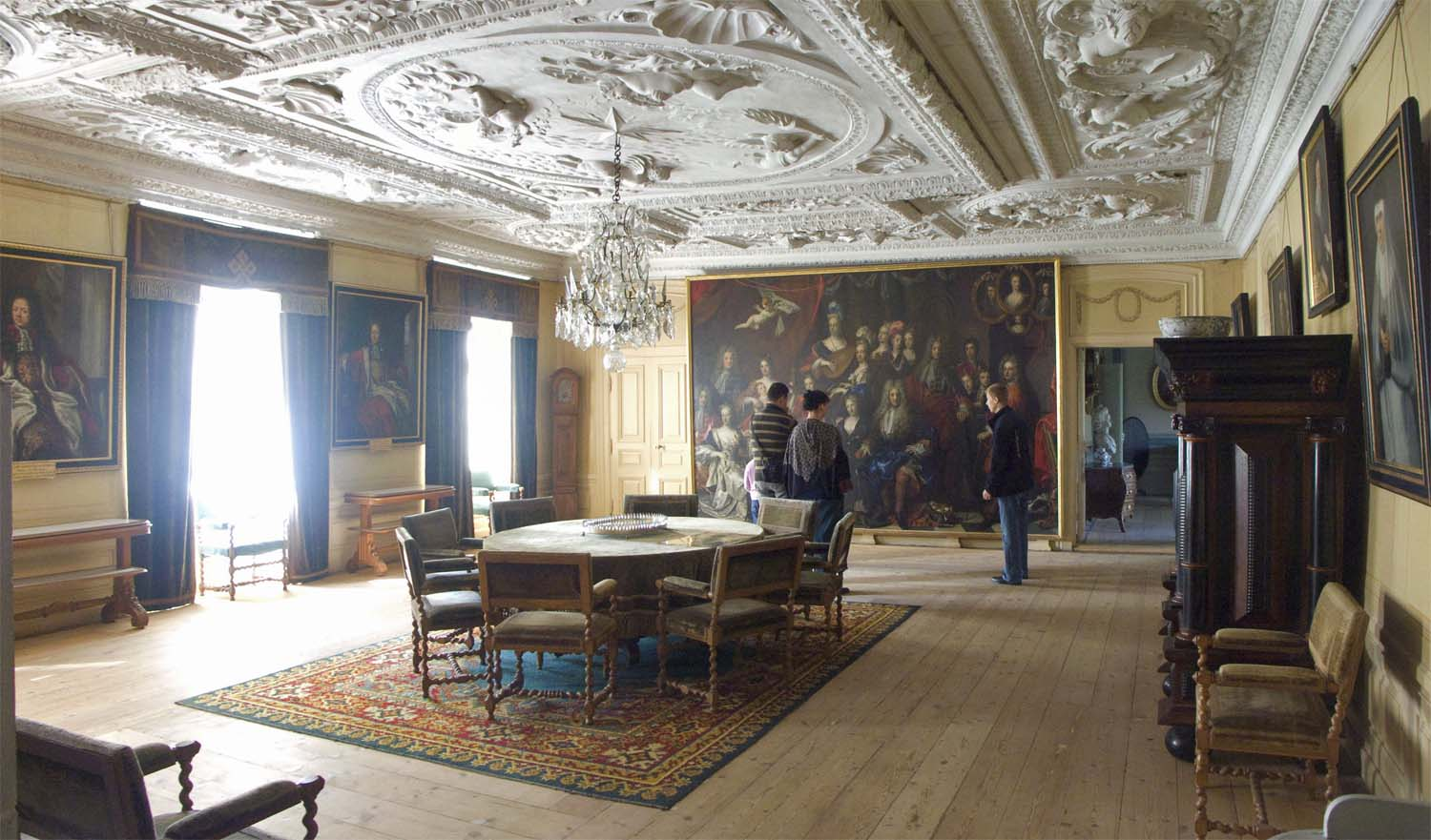
Interior from the Nynäs palace

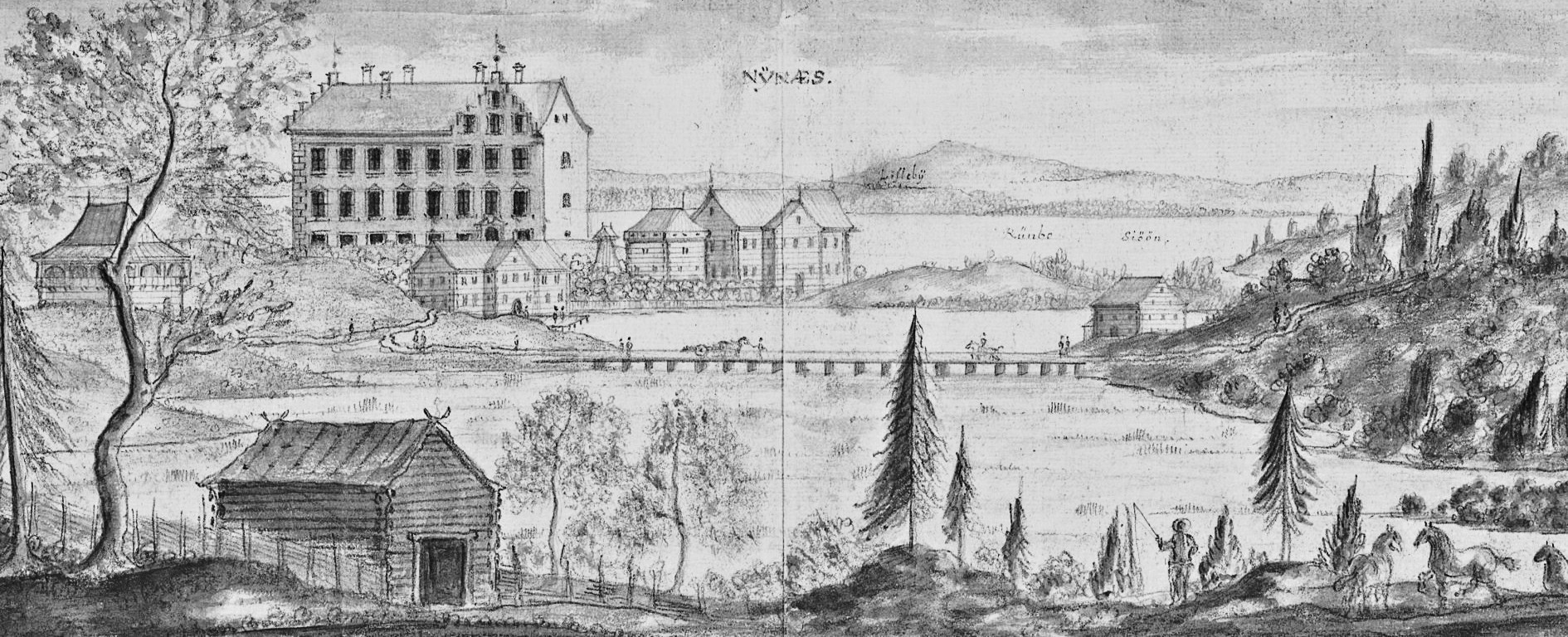
1663 print by Erik Dahlbergh

Archaeological finds dated back to the Bronze- and Iron Age suggest that the area surrounding Nynäs has been inhabited by humans for an extensive period of time. The vicinity to the coast and possibilities for agricultural activity were most likely the primary reasons for settlement in the territory. The adjacent Rundbo Lake was once connected to the Baltic Sea, working as an inland waterway and an ideal for settlement along its shorelines.

During Medieval times, Swedish nobility settled in Nynäs. The first mention of the Estate comes from a 1328 letter, during which time there lived Birgitta “daughter of Jon” and her husband Knight Peder Ragvaldson. Since then the property has been owned by Swedish aristocratic families such as Grip, Gyllenstierna, Hildebrand and Bonde.

The Gripenstedt family was the last family to privately own the Nynäs Estate. They came to area in the 1840s and remained owners of the manor until 1984. The descendants of the family still visit from time to time.

Since 1984 the province of Sörmland has taken responsibility for the care and maintenance of the manor and its surrounding reserve.

== The Estate ==
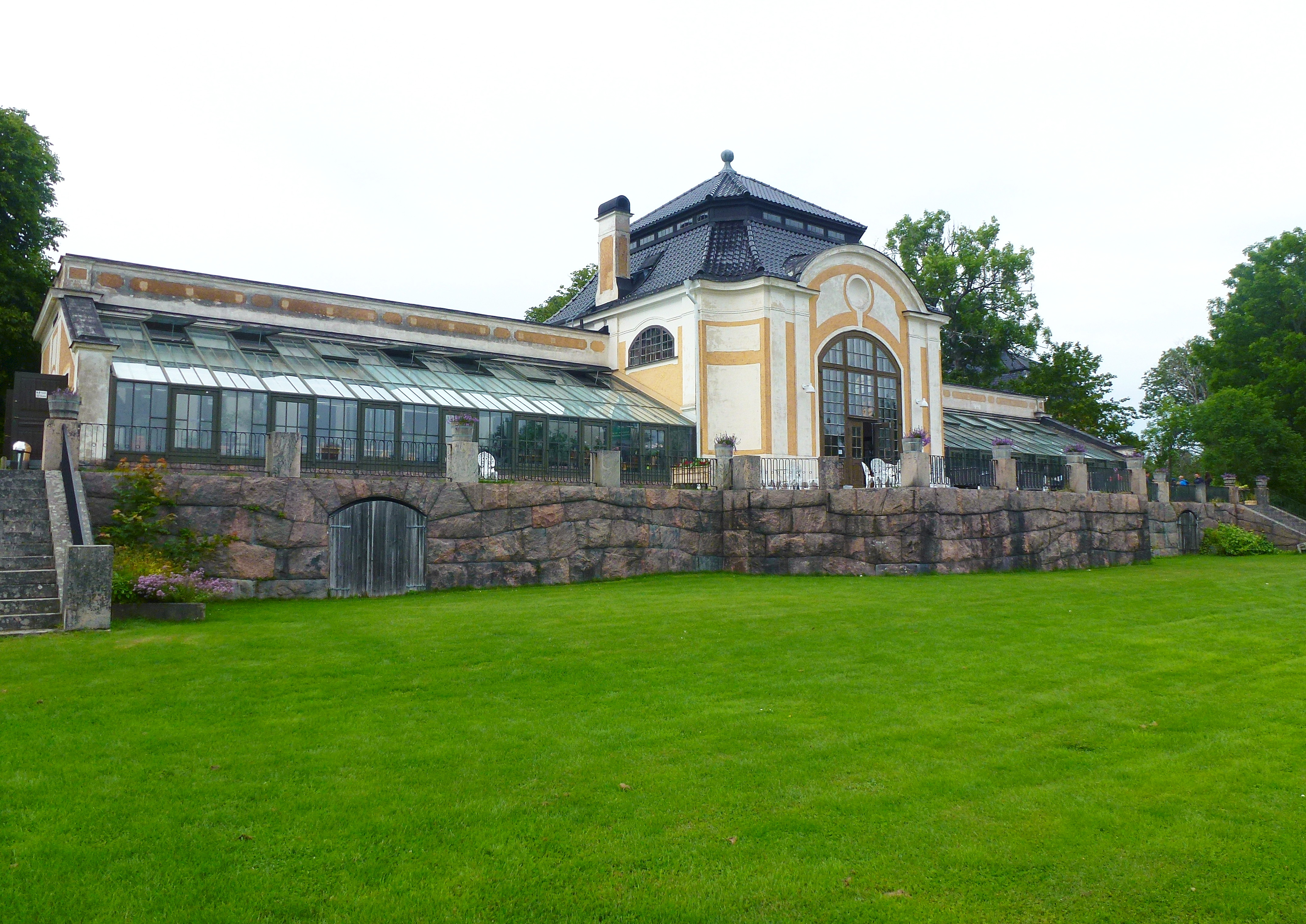
The Orangery

Nynäs Castle is located about 80 km south of Stockholm, between the historic towns of Trosa and Nyköping. Its nature reserve is the largest in the province of Södermanland, spreading out for 8070 acres of land.

The manor-house was built by the Gyllenstierna family in the late 17 century and is today considered to be one of the best-preserved historic houses open to the public in Sweden. The tour of the house aims to give a good idea of what the "country home" life style of Swedish aristocracy, from the late 1600s up to the early 20th century, would have been like.

The 1907 Orangery, located in the castle's park, houses a restaurant and a gardening shop.

== See also ==
- List of castles in Sweden
