= Margareta Grip =

Swedish writer and baroness (1538–1586)

Margareta "Marina" Birgersdotter Grip (1538–1586), was a Swedish baroness, lady-in-waiting, writer and landowner. She is known for her writing: she copied letters and documents from the Middle Ages, the originals of which have since been lost, and for her genealogical research. Genealogical works became common among the nobility after her day, and her work is considered the first of the genre in Sweden.

== Life ==
She was born to riksråd baron Birger Nilsson Grip and Brita Joachimsdotter Brahe. After the death of her mother in 1554, she attended the royal court prior to her marriage. She wrote later that "Soon after my mother died, I came to King Gustaf, became well liked by King, Queen and Princes", and she was thereafter recommended to court positions because she was considered a courtly lady with knowledge of court life.

In 1562, she married the noble Erik Månsson Natt och Dag, son of Måns Johansson and Barbro Eriksdotter. She was thereby the sister-in-law of the lady-in-waiting Karin Gyllenstierna, who were also her neighbor on the estate Säby. After being widowed shortly after, she managed the estate Brokind Castle on behalf of her minor son Erik Eriksson Natt och Dag (d. 1566). After the death of her son, she inherited the Bro estate personally. In 1571, she married riksråd Sten Axelsson Banér. However, she remained the sole manager of the Bro estate.

Margareta Birgersdotter Grip has been claimed to be the Mistress of the Robes of Queen Karin Månsdotter in 1567–1568. However, Elin Andersdotter is confirmed to have had that position. However, Grip did serve as Karin's temporary Mistress of the Robes directly after Karin became queen in 1567, when she was summoned by the king himself "without any opposition travel to us [...] and bring with you the little maids you have staying with you [...] set all other excuses aside", likely in order to enhance the status of the new commoner queen.

Margareta Grip copied a large amount of documents and letters from the Middle Ages, whose originals have since been lost, and who are therefore important historical documents. She produced a genealogical work, with the intent of vindicating her ancestor, Bo Jonsson Grip, a work she started in 1574. Genealogical research became common among the nobility in the late 16th century, but Grip are regarded as the pioneer of this genre in Sweden. Her work is kept at the Trolleholm Castle archive.
