= Brokind Castle =

Coordinates: 58°12′39″N 15°39′44″E

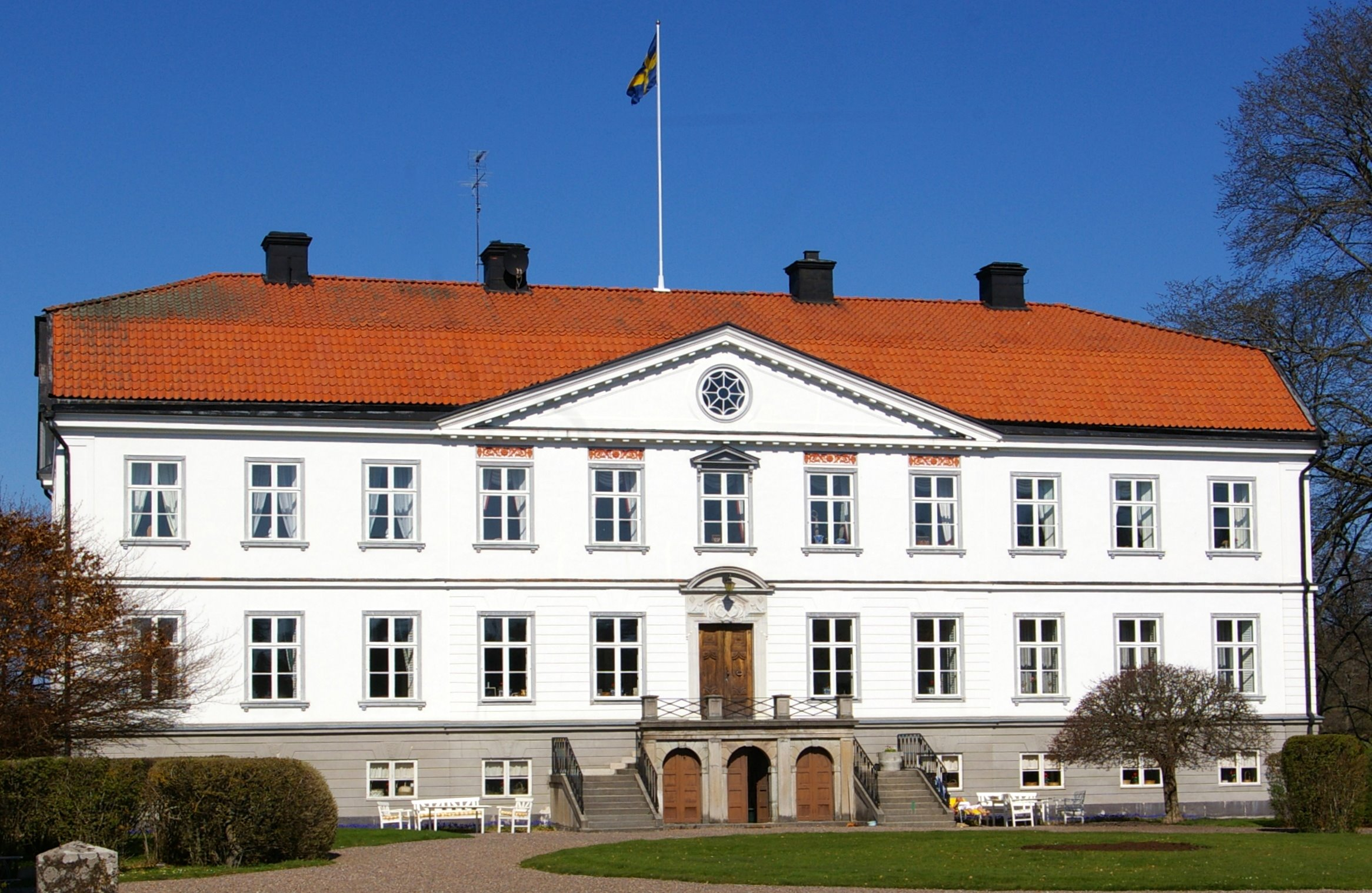
Brokind Castle

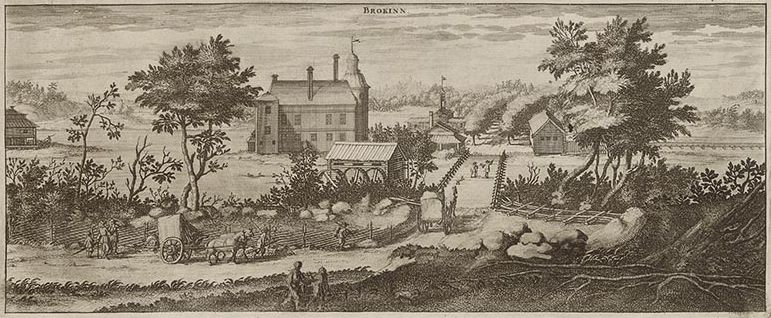
Brokind around 1700 depicted in Erik Dahlbergh's work Suecia antiqua et hodierna.

Brokind Castle (Brokinds slott) is a manor house situated south of Linköping in Östergötland, Sweden.

== History ==
Brokind was reportedly originally a village by the name Broo before becoming an estate, which belonged to the House of Bjälbo during the Middle Ages. Brokind was originally the site of a fortress with a tower. It belonged to Bo Jonsson (Grip) in the 14th-century, and then the Natt och Dag family until 1706. Between 1562 and 1586, it was managed by Baroness Margareta Grip (1538–1586).

From 1706 the estate has been owned by members of the Falkenberg family. The present building was built in 1727–1731 by Anna Maria Falkenberg and replaced the medieval castle that burned down in 1726. Its exterior was changed in 1838 according to the drawings of Abraham Bengtsson Nyström (1789-1849).

== Other sources ==
- Brokind i Nordisk familjebok (andra upplagan, 1905)
- Lars Cnattingius (1962) Abraham Nyström och hans söner – en östgötsk byggmästarfamilj under 1800-talet (Stockholms högskola)
